= Robert Schrader =

German mathematician and physicist (1939–2015)

- Born: September 12, 1939; Berlin, Germany
- Died: November 29, 2015 (aged 76); Berlin, Germany
- Education: ETH Zurich
- Known for: Osterwalder–Schrader axioms
- Scientific career
- Fields: Mathematical physics
- Workplaces: Free University of Berlin
- Thesis: Das Galilei-invariante Lee Modell (1968)
- Doctoral advisor: Klaus Hepp; Res Jost

Robert Schrader (12 September 1939 – 29 November 2015) was a German theoretical and mathematical physicist and professor of the Free University of Berlin. He is known for the Osterwalder–Schrader axioms.

== Biography ==
Robert Schrader was born in Berlin, Germany in 1939.

From 1959 to 1964 Schrader studied physics at Kiel University, the University of Zurich, and the University of Hamburg, where he completed his Diplom in 1964. His Diplom thesis Die Charaktere der inhomogenen Lorentzgruppe (The characters of the inhomogeneous Lorentz group) was supervised by Harry Lehmann and Hans Joos. In 1965 he went to ETH Zurich, where he worked as an assistant and received his doctorate (Promotion) in 1969 under the supervision of Klaus Hepp and Res Jost. His thesis, published in Communications in Mathematical Physics, dealt with the Lee model introduced in 1954 by Tsung-Dao Lee.

From 1970 to 1973 Schrader was a research fellow at Harvard University and at Princeton University. At Harvard under the supervision of Arthur Jaffe, he worked with Konrad Osterwalder on Euclidean quantum field theory. In 1971 Schrader habilitated at the University of Hamburg with the thesis Das Yukawa Modell in zwei Raum-Zeit-Dimensionen (The Yukawa model in two space-time dimensions). He was a professor of theoretical physics at the Free University of Berlin from 1973 until his retirement in 2005. He was a visiting scientist in 1974 and again in 1980 at the IHÉS at Paris, in 1976 in Harvard, in 1979 at CERN, for the academic year 1986/87 at the Institute for Advanced Study, and in 1989 at the ETH. For two academic years from 1982 to 1984, he was a visiting professor at the State University of New York at Stony Brook.

Schrader was the author or coauthor of more than 100 scientific publications. He dealt with axiomatic quantum field theory and, with Konrad Osterwalder, introduced in 1973 the Osterwalder–Schrader axioms for Euclidean Green's functions. Arthur Jaffe suggested to his postdocs Osterwalder and Schrader that they study the work on the Euclidean formulation of quantum field theory (QFT) done by Kurt Symanzik and Edward Nelson. The two postdocs published a set of axioms, which contained the crucial property called reflection positivity (RP), also referred to as Osterwalder–Schrader positivity. The Osterwalder–Schrader reconstruction theorem states that the Wightman functions of a relativistic QFT can be reconstructed from the Schwinger functions of a Euclidean theory satisfying the Osterwalder-Schrader axioms. RP is important for statistical mechanics and lattice gauge theory. Schrader worked on many other areas of mathematical and theoretical physics, such as Yang–Mills theory, invariants of three-dimensional manifolds, lattice formulation of gravitational theory, quantum chaos, and possibilities for measuring gravitational waves with SQUIDs. His extensive collaboration with Vadim Korstrykin included research on quantum wires and Laplacian operators on metric graphs.

He died from cancer in 2015.

== Selected publications ==
- Joos, H.; Schrader, R. (1968). "On the primitive characters of the Poincaré group". Communications in Mathematical Physics. 7 (1): 21–50. Bibcode:1968CMaPh...7...21J. doi:10.1007/BF01651216. S2CID 122086054.
- Schrader, R. (1972). "The Maxwell Group and the Quantum Theory of Particles in Classical Homogeneous Electromagnetic Fields". Fortschritte der Physik. 20 (12): 701–734. Bibcode:1972ForPh..20..701S. doi:10.1002/prop.19720201202.
- Osterwalder, Konrad; Schrader, R. (1972). "Feynman-Kac Formula for Euclidean Fermi and Bose Fields". Physical Review Letters. 29 (20): 1423–1425. Bibcode:1972PhRvL..29.1423O. doi:10.1103/PhysRevLett.29.1423.
- Borisov, N. V.; Müller, W.; Schrader, R. (1988). "Relative index theorems and supersymmetric scattering theory". Communications in Mathematical Physics. 114 (3): 475–513. Bibcode:1988CMaPh.114..475B. doi:10.1007/BF01242140. S2CID 120777217.
- Fring, A.; Kostrykin, V.; Schrader, R. (1996). "On the absence of bound-state stabilization through short ultra-intense fields". Journal of Physics B: Atomic, Molecular and Optical Physics. 29 (23): 5651–5671. arXiv:quant-ph/9604009. Bibcode:1996JPhB...29.5651F. doi:10.1088/0953-4075/29/23/011. S2CID 250893761.
- Kostrykin, V.; Schrader, R. (1999). "Scattering Theory Approach to Random Schrödinger Operators in One Dimension". Reviews in Mathematical Physics. 11 (2): 187–242. arXiv:math-ph/0011032. Bibcode:1999RvMaP..11..187K. doi:10.1142/S0129055X99000088. S2CID 16321746.
- Schrader, R. (2000). "On a Quantum Version of Shannon's Conditional Entropy". Fortschritte der Physik. 48 (8): 747–762. arXiv:quant-ph/0003048. Bibcode:2000ForPh..48..747S. doi:10.1002/1521-3978(200008)48:8<747::AID-PROP747>3.0.CO;2-T. S2CID 33354304.
- Kostrykin, Vadim; Schrader, Robert (2006). "The inverse scattering problem for metric graphs and the traveling salesman problem". arXiv:math-ph/0603010. Bibcode:2006math.ph...3010K.
- Kostrykin, Vadim; Potthoff, Jürgen; Schrader, Robert (2012). "Brownian motions on metric graphs". Journal of Mathematical Physics. 53 (9): 095206. arXiv:1102.4937. Bibcode:2012JMP....53i5206K. doi:10.1063/1.4714661. S2CID 119611746.
- Schrader, R. (2016). "Piecewise linear manifolds: Einstein metrics and Ricci flows". Journal of Physics A: Mathematical and Theoretical. 49 (20) 205201. arXiv:1508.05520. Bibcode:2016JPhA...49t5201S. doi:10.1088/1751-8113/49/20/205201. S2CID 119609343.
