= Spin–statistics theorem =

Theorem in quantum mechanics

The spin–statistics theorem proves that the observed relationship between the intrinsic spin of a particle (angular momentum not due to the orbital motion) and the quantum particle statistics of collections of such particles is a consequence of the mathematics of quantum mechanics.

According to the theorem, the many-body wave function for elementary particles with integer spin (bosons) is symmetric under the exchange of any two particles, whereas for particles with half-integer spin (fermions), the wave function is antisymmetric under such an exchange. A consequence of the theorem is that non-interacting particles with integer spin obey Bose–Einstein statistics, while those with half-integer spin obey Fermi–Dirac statistics.

== Background ==
The statistics of indistinguishable particles is among the most fundamental of physical effects. The Pauli exclusion principle – that every occupied quantum state contains at most one fermion – controls the formation of matter. The basic building blocks of matter such as protons, neutrons, and electrons are all fermions. Conversely, photon and other particles which mediate forces between matter particles, are bosons. A spin–statistics theorem attempts to explain the origin of this fundamental dichotomy.

Naively, spin, an angular momentum property intrinsic to a particle, would be unrelated to fundamental properties of a collection of such particles. However, these are indistinguishable particles: any physical prediction relating multiple indistinguishable particles must not change when the particles are exchanged.

=== Quantum states and indistinguishable particles ===
In a quantum system, a physical state is described by a state vector. A pair of distinct state vectors are physically equivalent if they differ only by an overall phase factor, ignoring other interactions. A pair of indistinguishable particles such as this have only one state. This means that if the positions of the particles are exchanged (i.e., they undergo a permutation), this does not identify a new physical state, but rather one matching the original physical state. In fact, one cannot tell which particle is in which position.

While the physical state does not change under the exchange of the particles' positions, it is possible for the state vector to change sign as a result of an exchange. Since this sign change is just an overall phase, this does not affect the physical state.

The essential ingredient in proving the spin-statistics relation is relativity, that the physical laws do not change under Lorentz transformations. The field operators transform under Lorentz transformations according to the spin of the particle that they create, by definition.

Additionally, the assumption (known as microcausality) that spacelike-separated fields either commute or anticommute can be made only for relativistic theories with a time direction. Otherwise, the notion of being spacelike is meaningless. However, the proof involves looking at a Euclidean version of spacetime, in which the time direction is treated as a spatial one, as will be now explained.

Lorentz transformations include 3-dimensional rotations and boosts. A boost transfers to a frame of reference with a different velocity and is mathematically like a rotation into time. By analytic continuation of the correlation functions of a quantum field theory, the time coordinate may become imaginary, and then boosts become rotations. The new "spacetime" has only spatial directions and is termed Euclidean.

=== Exchange symmetry or permutation symmetry ===
Bosons are particles whose wavefunction is symmetric under such an exchange or permutation, so if we swap the particles, the wavefunction does not change. Fermions are particles whose wavefunction is antisymmetric, so under such a swap the wavefunction gets a minus sign, meaning that the amplitude for two identical fermions to occupy the same state must be zero. This is the Pauli exclusion principle: two identical fermions cannot occupy the same state. This rule does not hold for bosons.

In quantum field theory, a state or a wavefunction is described by field operators operating on some basic state called the vacuum. In order for the operators to project out the symmetric or antisymmetric component of the creating wavefunction, they must have the appropriate commutation law. The operator

$$\iint \psi(x,y) \phi(x)\phi(y)\,dx\,dy$$

(with $\phi$ an operator and $\psi(x,y)$ a numerical function with complex values) creates a two-particle state with wavefunction $\psi(x,y)$, and depending on the commutation properties of the fields, either only the antisymmetric parts or the symmetric parts matter.

Let us assume that $x \ne y$ and the two operators take place at the same time; more generally, they may have spacelike separation, as is explained hereafter.

If the fields commute, meaning that the following holds:

$$\phi(x)\phi(y)=\phi(y)\phi(x),$$

then only the symmetric part of $\psi$ contributes, so that $\psi(x,y) = \psi(y,x)$, and the field will create bosonic particles.

On the other hand, if the fields anticommute, meaning that $\phi$ has the property that

$$\phi(x)\phi(y)=-\phi(y)\phi(x),$$

then only the antisymmetric part of $\psi$ contributes, so that $\psi(x,y) = -\psi(y,x)$, and the particles will be fermionic.

== Proofs ==
An elementary explanation for the spin–statistics theorem cannot be given despite the fact that the theorem is so simple to state. In The Feynman Lectures on Physics, Richard Feynman said that this probably means that we do not have a complete understanding of the fundamental principle involved.

Numerous notable proofs have been published, with different kinds of limitations and assumptions. They are all "negative proofs", meaning that they establish that integer spin fields cannot result in fermion statistics while half-integral spin fields cannot result in boson statistics.

Proofs that avoid using any relativistic quantum field theory mechanism have defects. Many such proofs rely on a claim that
$$|\psi(\alpha_1, \alpha_2, \alpha_3, \dots)|^2 = |\hat{P}\psi(\alpha_1, \alpha_2, \alpha_3, \dots)|^2,$$
where the operator $\hat{P}$ permutes the coordinates. However, the value on the left-hand side represents the probability of particle 1 at $r_1$, particle 2 at $r_2$, and so on, and is thus quantum-mechanically invalid for indistinguishable particles.

The first proof was formulated in 1939 by Markus Fierz, a student of Wolfgang Pauli, and was rederived in a more systematic way by Pauli the following year. In a later summary, Pauli listed three postulates within relativistic quantum field theory as required for these versions of the theorem:

1. Any state with particle occupation has higher energy than the vacuum state.
2. Spatially separated measurements do not disturb each other (they commute).
3. Physical probabilities are positive (the metric of the Hilbert space is positive-definite).

Their analysis neglected particle interactions other than commutation/anti-commutation of the state.

In 1949 Richard Feynman gave a completely different type of proof based on vacuum polarization, which was later critiqued by Pauli. Pauli showed that Feynman's proof explicitly relied on the first two postulates he used and implicitly used the third one by first allowing negative probabilities but then rejecting field theory results with probabilities greater than one.

A proof by Julian Schwinger in 1950 based on time-reversal invariance followed a proof by Frederik Belinfante in 1940 based on charge-conjugation invariance, leading to a connection to the CPT theorem more fully developed by Pauli in 1955. These proofs were notably difficult to follow.

Work on the axiomatization of quantum field theory by Arthur Wightman led to a theorem that stated that the expectation value of the product of two fields, $\phi(x)\phi(y)$, could be analytically continued to all separations $(x - y)$. (The first two postulates of the Pauli-era proofs involve the vacuum state and fields at separate locations.) The new result allowed more rigorous proofs of the spin–statistics theorems by Gerhart Lüders and Bruno Zumino and by Peter Burgoyne. In 1957 Res Jost derived the CPT theorem using the spin–statistics theorem, and Burgoyne's proof of the spin–statistics theorem in 1958 required no constraints on the interactions nor on the form of the field theories. These results are among the most rigorous practical theorems.

In spite of these successes, Feynman, in his 1963 undergraduate lecture that discussed the spin–statistics connection, says: "We apologize for the fact that we cannot give you an elementary explanation." Neuenschwander echoed this in 1994, asking whether there was any progress, spurring additional proofs and books. Neuenschwander's 2013 popularization of the spin–statistics connection suggested that simple explanations remain elusive.

An intuitive topological argument for why the spin-statistics theorem ought to be true is due to the fact that when represented by appropriate spacetime diagrams, a process in which two identical particles exchange positions can be topologically equivalent to a process in which a single such particle rotates by 360 degrees. One form of the intuitive argument envisions a ribbon held on one end then spiraled 360 degrees on the other end; as the ends are brought towards each other, the spiral relaxes into a loop. The loop is topologically equivalent to a spacetime diagram of positron-electron creation/annihilation with the incoming and outgoing electron being indistinguishable particles.

== Experimental tests ==
In 1987 Greenberg and Mohapatra proposed that the spin–statistics theorem could have small violations. With the help of very precise calculations for states of the He atom that violate the Pauli exclusion principle, Deilamian, Gillaspy and Kelleher looked for the 1s2s ^{1}S_{0} state of He using an atomic-beam spectrometer. The search was unsuccessful with an upper limit of 5×10^{−6}.

== Relation to representation theory of the Lorentz group ==
The Lorentz group has no non-trivial unitary representations of finite dimension. Thus it seems impossible to construct a Hilbert space in which all states have finite, non-zero spin and positive, Lorentz-invariant norm. This problem is overcome in different ways depending on particle spin–statistics.

For a state of integer spin the negative norm states (known as "unphysical polarization") are set to zero, which makes the use of gauge symmetry necessary.

For a state of half-integer spin the argument can be circumvented by having fermionic statistics.

== Composite particles ==
The spin–statistics theorem applies not only to elementary particles but also to composite particles formed from them, provided that the internal structure of the composites is identical and they remain bound under the conditions being considered. One can consider the many-body wave function for the composite particles. If all the constituent elementary particles in one composite are simultaneously exchanged with those in another, the resulting sign change of the wave function is determined by the number of fermions within each composite. In such systems, the total spin of the composite particle arises from the quantum mechanical addition of the angular momenta of its constituents: if the number of constituent fermions is even, the composite has integer spin and behaves as a boson with a symmetric wave function; if the number is odd, the spin is half-integer and the composite behaves as a fermion with an antisymmetric wave function. This result has been called the Ehrenfest-Oppenheimer theorem.

Hadrons are composite subatomic particles made of quarks bound together by the strong interaction. Quarks are fermions with spin of 1/2. Hadrons fall into two main categories: baryons, which consist of an odd number of quarks (typically three), and mesons, which consist of an even number of quarks (typically a quark and an antiquark). Baryons, such as protons and neutrons, are fermions due to their odd number of constituent quarks. Mesons, like pions, are bosons because they contain an even number of quarks.

The effect that quantum statistics have on composite particles is evident in the superfluid properties of the two helium isotopes, helium-3 and helium-4. In neutral atoms, each proton is always matched by one electron, so that the total number of protons plus electrons is always even. Therefore, an atom behaves as a fermion if it contains an odd number of neutrons, and as a boson if the number of neutrons is even. Helium-3 has one neutron and is a fermion, while helium-4 has two neutrons and is a boson. At a temperature of 2.17 K, helium-4 undergoes a phase transition to a superfluid state that can be understood as a type of Bose–Einstein condensate. Such a mechanism is not directly available for the fermionic helium-3, which remains a normal liquid to much lower temperatures. Below 2.6 mK, helium-3 also transitions into a superfluid state. This is achieved by a mechanism similar to superconductivity: the interactions between helium-3 atoms first bind the atoms into Cooper pairs, which are again bosonic, and the pairs can then undergo Bose-Einstein condensation.

Although composite bosons exhibit similar behavior as elementary bosons, the fermionic nature of their constituents sometimes introduces subtle effects due to the Pauli exclusion principle. These effects limit how closely the composite bosons can be packed, and are especially significant in dense systems. They are sometimes modelled as effective interactions between composites.

== Quasiparticle anyons in 2 dimensions ==
In 1982, physicist Frank Wilczek published a research paper on the possibilities of possible fractional-spin particles, which he termed anyons from their ability to take on "any" spin. He wrote that they were theoretically predicted to arise in low-dimensional systems where motion is restricted to fewer than three spatial dimensions. Wilczek described their spin statistics as "interpolating continuously between the usual boson and fermion cases". The effect has become the basis for understanding the fractional quantum Hall effect.

== See also ==
- Anyonic statistics
- Braid statistics
- Parastatistics
