= Sergio Albeverio =

Swiss mathematician

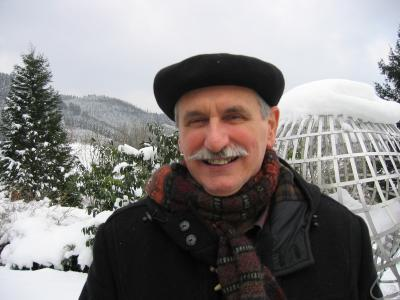
- Born: 17 January 1939 (age 87); Lugano, Switzerland
- Education: Eidgenössische Technische Hochschule Zürich
- Scientific career
- Fields: Mathematics, Mathematical Physics
- Workplaces: University of Bonn
- Doctoral advisor: Res Jost and Markus Fierz

Sergio A. Albeverio (born 17 January 1939) is a Swiss mathematician and mathematical physicist working in numerous fields of mathematics and its applications. In particular he is known for his work in probability theory, analysis (including infinite-dimensional, non-standard, and stochastic analysis), mathematical physics, and in the areas algebra, geometry, number theory, as well as in applications, from natural to social-economic sciences.

He initiated (with Raphael Høegh-Krohn) a systematic mathematical theory of Feynman path integrals and of infinite-dimensional Dirichlet forms and associated stochastic processes (with applications particularly in quantum mechanics, statistical mechanics and quantum field theory). He also gave essential contributions to the development of areas such as p-adic functional and stochastic analysis as well as to the singular perturbation theory for differential operators. Other important contributions concern constructive quantum field theory and representation theory of infinite-dimensional groups. He also initiated a new approach to the study of galaxy and planet formation inspired by stochastic mechanics.
