= Yang–Mills existence and mass gap =

Millennium Prize Problem

The Yang–Mills existence and mass gap problem is an unsolved problem in mathematical physics and mathematics, and one of the seven Millennium Prize Problems defined by the Clay Mathematics Institute, which has offered a prize of US$1,000,000 for its solution.

The problem is phrased as follows:

Yang–Mills Existence and Mass Gap. Prove that for any compact simple gauge group G, a non-trivial quantum Yang–Mills theory exists on $\mathbb{R}^4$ and has a mass gap Δ > 0. Existence includes establishing axiomatic properties at least as strong as those cited in Streater & Wightman (1964), Osterwalder & Schrader (1973) and Osterwalder & Schrader (1975) [citations adapted].

In this statement, a quantum Yang–Mills theory is a non-abelian quantum field theory similar to that underlying the Standard Model of particle physics; $\mathbb{R}^4$ is Euclidean 4-space; the mass gap Δ is the mass of the least massive particle predicted by the theory.

Therefore, the winner must prove that:

- Yang–Mills theory exists and satisfies the standard of rigor that characterizes contemporary mathematical physics, in particular constructive quantum field theory, and
- The mass of all particles of the force field predicted by the theory are strictly positive.

For example, in the case of G=SU(3)—the strong nuclear interaction—the winner must prove that glueballs have a lower mass bound, and thus cannot be arbitrarily light.

The general problem of determining the presence of a mass gap (a special case of a spectral gap) in a system is known to be undecidable, meaning no computer algorithm exists that can find the answer programmatically.

On 26 October 2026, OpenAI announced an AI-generated proof for the existence portion, but not the mass gap. The existence proof was verified by an independent team led by David Gross. The mass gap problem remains unproven.

== Background ==
[...] one does not yet have a mathematically complete example of a quantum gauge theory in four-dimensional space-time, nor even a precise definition of quantum gauge theory in four dimensions. Will this change in the 21st century? We hope so!

— From the Clay Institute's official problem description by Arthur Jaffe and Edward Witten.

The problem requires the construction of a QFT satisfying the Wightman axioms and showing the existence of a mass gap. Both of these topics are described in sections below.

=== Wightman axioms ===
The Millennium problem requires the proposed Yang–Mills theory to satisfy the Wightman axioms or similarly stringent axioms. There are four axioms:

==== W0 (assumptions of relativistic quantum mechanics) ====
Quantum mechanics is described according to John von Neumann; in particular, the pure states are given by the rays, i.e. the one-dimensional subspaces, of some separable complex Hilbert space.

The Wightman axioms require that the Poincaré group acts unitarily on the Hilbert space. In other words, a change of reference frame (position, velocity, rotation) must be a unitary operator, or a surjective operator which preserves the inner product, which can be viewed as an isomorphism on a Hilbert space. Among the implications of this is the fact that the probability of an event must not change with a change of reference frame, as the probability of an event occurring is its inner product with itself. This requirement can also be stated in other words to mean that the Wightman axioms have position dependent operators called quantum fields which form covariant representations of the Poincaré group.

The group of space-time translations is commutative, and so the operators can be simultaneously diagonalised. The generators of these groups give us four self-adjoint operators, $P_j,j=0,1,2,3$, which transform under the homogeneous group as a four-vector, called the energy-momentum four-vector.

The second part of the zeroth axiom of Wightman is that the representation U(a, A) fulfills the spectral condition—that the simultaneous spectrum of energy-momentum is contained in the forward cone (using mostly minus convention):

$$P_0\geq 0,\;\;\;\;P_0^2 - P_jP_j\geq 0.$$

The third part of the axiom is that there is a unique state, represented by a ray in the Hilbert space, which is invariant under the action of the Poincaré group. It is called a vacuum.

==== W1 (assumptions on the domain and continuity of the field) ====
For each test function f, there exists a set of operators $A_1(f),\ldots ,A_n(f)$ which, together with their adjoints, are defined on a dense subset of the Hilbert state space, containing the vacuum. The fields A are operator-valued tempered distributions. The Hilbert state space is spanned by the field polynomials acting on the vacuum (cyclicity condition).

==== W2 (transformation law of the field) ====
The fields are covariant under the action of Poincaré group, and they transform according to some representation S of the Lorentz group, or SL(2,C) if the spin is not integer:

$$U(a,L)^{\dagger}A(x)U(a,L)=S(L)A(L^{-1}(x-a)).$$

==== W3 (local commutativity or microscopic causality) ====
If the supports of two fields are space-like separated, then the fields either commute or anticommute.

Cyclicity of a vacuum, and uniqueness of a vacuum are sometimes considered separately. Also, there is the property of asymptotic completeness—that the Hilbert state space is spanned by the asymptotic spaces $H^{in}$ and $H^{out}$, appearing in the collision S matrix. The other important property of field theory is the mass gap which is not required by the axioms—that the energy-momentum spectrum has a gap between zero and some positive number.

=== Mass gap ===
In quantum field theory, the mass gap is the difference in energy between the vacuum and the next lowest energy state. The energy of the vacuum is zero by definition, and assuming that all energy states can be thought of as particles in plane-waves, the mass gap is the mass of the lightest particle.

For a given real field $\phi(x)$, we can say that the theory has a mass gap if the two-point function has the property

$$\langle\phi(0,t)\phi(0,0)\rangle\sim \sum_nA_n\exp\left(-\Delta_nt\right)$$

with $\Delta_0>0$ being the lowest energy value in the spectrum of the Hamiltonian and thus the mass gap. This quantity, easy to generalize to other fields, is what is generally measured in lattice computations. It was proved in this way that Yang–Mills theory develops a mass gap on a lattice.

== Importance of Yang–Mills theory ==
Most known and nontrivial (i.e. interacting) quantum field theories in 4 dimensions are effective field theories with a cutoff scale. Since the beta function is positive for most models, it appears that most such models have a Landau pole as it is not at all clear whether or not they have nontrivial UV fixed points. This means that if such a QFT is well-defined at all scales, as it has to be to satisfy the axioms of axiomatic quantum field theory, it would have to be trivial (i.e. a free field theory).

Quantum Yang–Mills theory with a non-abelian gauge group and no quarks is an exception, because asymptotic freedom characterizes this theory, meaning that it has a trivial UV fixed point. Hence it is the simplest nontrivial constructive QFT in 4 dimensions. (QCD is a more complicated theory because it involves quarks.)

=== Quark confinement ===
At the level of rigor of theoretical physics, it has been well established that the quantum Yang–Mills theory for a non-abelian Lie group exhibits a property known as confinement; though proper mathematical physics has more demanding requirements on a proof. A consequence of this property is that above the confinement scale, the color charges are connected by chromodynamic flux tubes leading to a linear potential between the charges. Hence isolated color charge and isolated gluons cannot exist. In the absence of confinement, we would expect to see massless gluons, but since they are confined, all we would see are color-neutral bound states of gluons, called glueballs. If glueballs exist, they are massive, which is why a mass gap is expected.
