= Arthur Wightman =

American physicist (1922–2013)

Arthur Strong Wightman
- Born: March 30, 1922; Rochester, New York
- Died: January 13, 2013 (aged 90); Edison, New Jersey
- Education: Yale University (B.A., 1942); Princeton University (Ph.D, 1949)
- Known for: Axiomatic quantum field theory; Superselection; Wightman axioms
- Awards: Heineman Prize (1969); Henri Poincaré Prize (1997)
- Scientific career
- Fields: Physics
- Workplaces: Yale University (1943-44); Princeton University (1949-71)
- Thesis: The Moderation and Absorption of Negative Pions in Hydrogen (1949)
- Doctoral advisor: John Archibald Wheeler
- Doctoral students: Lawrence Schulman; Huzihiro Araki; Richard Ferrell; Stephen Fulling; Arthur Jaffe; Oscar Lanford; Jerrold Marsden; Eduard Prugovecki; Silvan S. Schweber; Barry Simon; Alan Sokal

Arthur Strong Wightman (March 30, 1922 – January 13, 2013) was an American mathematical physicist. He was one of the founders of the axiomatic approach to quantum field theory, and originated the set of Wightman axioms. With his rigorous treatment of quantum field theories, he promoted research on various aspects of modern mathematical physics.

== Biography ==
Arthur Wightman was born on March 30, 1922, in Rochester, in New York. He studied at the Yale University and in 1942 he earned a bachelor's degree in physics. In 1949 he received his doctorate at the Princeton University under the supervision of John Wheeler. He intended to graduate with Eugene Wigner, but he was spending most of his time at the Oak Ridge National Laboratory. In the early 1950s, he started as a young instructor in the Princeton Physics department and later became the Thomas D. Jones Professor of Mathematical Physics, in 1971. He retired in 1992 as professor emeritus. In the years 1951–1952 and 1956–1957 he was a visiting researcher at the University of Copenhagen at the Niels Bohr Institute, where he worked in particular with Gunnar Källén and Lars Gårding. In 1957 he was at the University of Paris and in the years 1963–1964 and 1968–1969 at the Institut des Hautes Études Scientifiques. Between 1977 and 1978 he was visiting professor at the École Polytechnique in Paris and in 1982 at the University of Adelaide.

Wightman has been married twice. His first wife, Anna-Greta Larsson, was an artist and photographer and died early. They had a daughter, Robin, who also died prematurely. The second wife was the Bulgarian translator Ludmilla Popova Wightman. Wightman died on January 13, 2013, in Princeton, in New Jersey.

== Scientific career ==
Already during his undergraduate studies, Arthur Wightman had close contacts with the mathematics department in Princeton. Together with the mathematician John Tate, Wightman was engaged in the work on the Lorentz and Poincaré groups representations.

In the 1950s, he introduced his Wightman axioms as a mathematical foundation to relativistic quantum field theory. Quantum fields are treated as distributions in space-time. The Hilbert space carries a unitary representation of the Poincaré group under which the field operators transform covariantly. Wightman's paper with D. Hall reported to a theorem that stated that the expectation value of the product of two fields, $\phi(x)\phi(y)$, could be analytically continued to all separations $(x-y)$. Using this, Res Jost was able to derive the PCT and the spin-statistics theorems, as shown in Wightman's and Streater's book. Together with Eugene Wigner and Gian-Carlo Wick, he introduced superselection rules and studied the representations of commutator and anti-commutator algebras with the mathematician Lars Gårding.

== Honors and awards ==
In 1969 Arthur Wightman was awarded the Dannie Heineman Prize for Mathematical Physics for founding and contributing in developing axiomatic quantum field theory and in 1997 the Henri Poincaré Prize of the International Association of Mathematical Physics for his central role in the foundations of the general theory of quantum fields. Since 1964 he was a fellow of the American Physical Society, since 1966 of the American Academy of Arts and Sciences, and since 1970 of the United States National Academy of Sciences. In 1962 he was an invited speaker at the International Congress of Mathematicians in Stockholm. In 1976 he was Josiah Willard Gibbs Lecturer.

== Selected publications ==
- Streater, Raymond F.; Wightman, Arthur S. (1989). PCT, spin and statistics, and all that. ISBN 978-0691070629.
- Wightman, Arthur S. (1956). "Quantum Field Theory in Terms of Vacuum Expectation Values". Physical Review. 101 (2): 860–866. Bibcode:1956PhRv..101..860W. doi:10.1103/PhysRev.101.860.
- Wightman, Arthur S.; Gårding, Lars (1965). "Fields as operator-valued distributions in relativistic quantum theory". Arkiv för Fysik. 28.
- Wightman, Arthur S. (1969). "What is the point of so-called axiomatic field theory?". Physics Today. 22 (9): 53–58. Bibcode:1969PhT....22i..53W. doi:10.1063/1.3035782.
- Wightman, Arthur S. (1967). Introduction to some aspects of the relativistic dynamics of quantized fields, Cargese Lectures in Theoretical Physics. Gordon and Breach Science Publishers.
- Wightman, Arthur S. (1977). "Should We Believe in Quantum Field Theory?". 15th Erice School of Subnuclear Physics: The Why's of Subnuclear Physics. pp. 983–1025.
- Wick, Gian Carlo; Wightman, Arthur S.; Wigner, Eugene P. (1952). "The intrinsic parity of elementary particles". Physical Review. 88 (1): 101–105. Bibcode:1952PhRv...88..101W. doi:10.1103/PhysRev.88.101.
- Wightman, Arthur S. (1981). "Looking back at quantum field theory". Physica Scripta. 24 (5): 813–816. doi:10.1088/0031-8949/24/5/001.
- Jaffe, Arthur; Wightman, Arthur S.; Jost, Res (1990). "For Res Jost, and To Arthur Wightman". Communications in Mathematical Physics. 132 (1): 1–4. doi:10.1007/BF02277996.
- Wightman, Arthur S. (1989). "The theory of quantized fields in the 50s". Pions to Quarks: Particle Physics in the 50s. 50: 255–261.

== See also ==
- Axiomatic quantum field theory
- Hilbert's sixth problem
- PCT Theorem
- Principle of locality
- Quantum field theory
- Wightman axioms
- Wightman functional
