= Hilbert's sixth problem =

Axiomatization of probability and physics

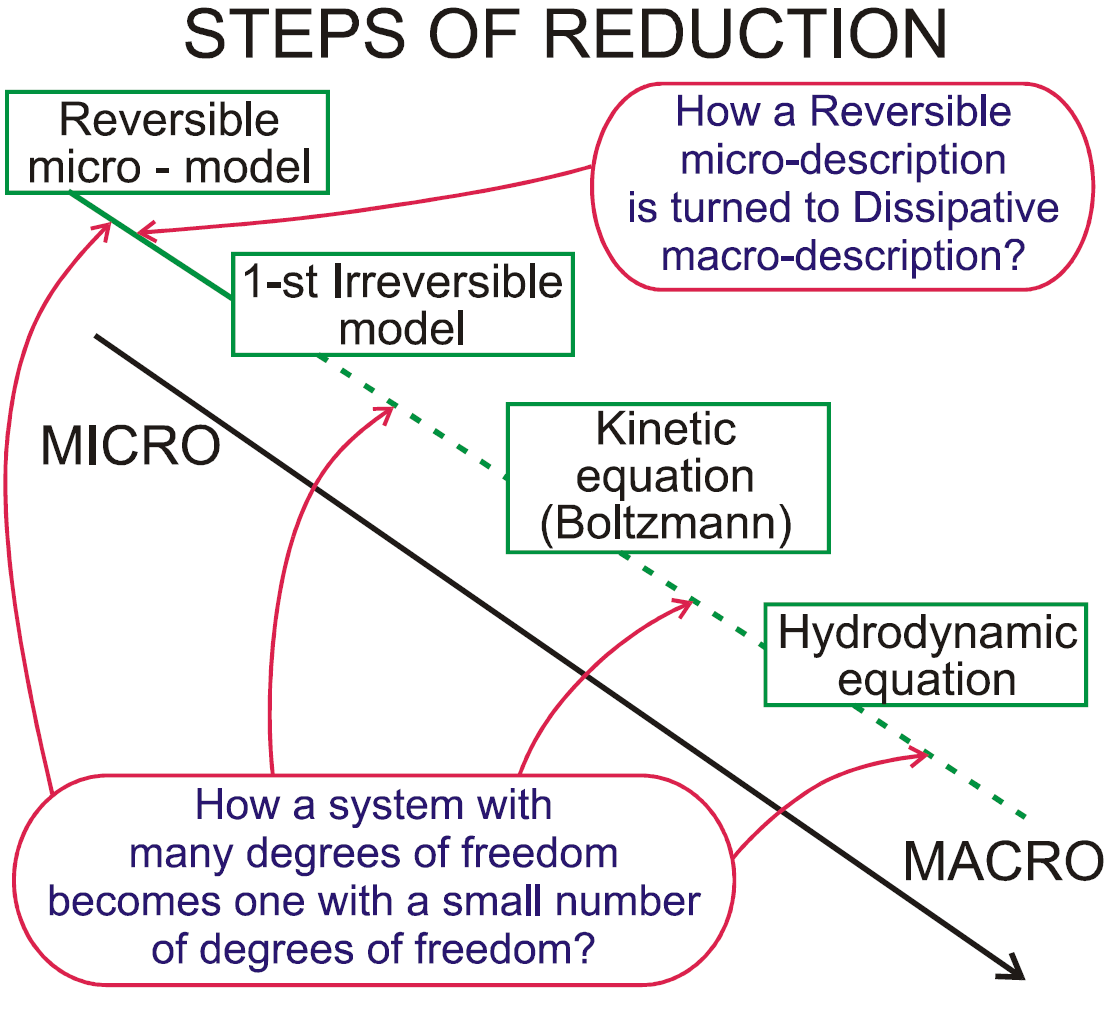
Stairs of model reduction from microscopic dynamics (the atomistic view) to macroscopic continuum dynamics (the laws of motion of continua) (Illustration to the content of the book)

Hilbert's sixth problem is to axiomatize those branches of physics in which mathematics is prevalent. It occurs on the widely cited list of Hilbert's problems in mathematics that he presented in the year 1900. Quoted in its common English translation, the explicit statement reads:

To treat in the same manner, by means of axioms, those physical sciences in which already today mathematics plays an important part; in the first rank are the theory of probabilities and mechanics.

Hilbert gave a further explanation of this problem and its possible specific forms:

As to the axioms of the theory of probabilities, it seems to me desirable that their logical investigation should be accompanied by a rigorous and satisfactory development of the method of mean values in mathematical physics, and in particular in the kinetic theory of gases. ... Boltzmann's work on the principles of mechanics suggests the problem of developing mathematically the limiting processes, there merely indicated, which lead from the atomistic view to the laws of motion of continua.

== History ==
David Hilbert himself devoted much of his research to the sixth problem; in particular, he worked in those fields of physics that arose after he stated the problem.

In the 1910s, celestial mechanics evolved into general relativity. Hilbert and Emmy Noether corresponded extensively with Albert Einstein on the formulation of the theory.

In the 1920s, mechanics of microscopic systems evolved into quantum mechanics. Hilbert, with the assistance of John von Neumann, L. Nordheim, and E. P. Wigner, worked on the axiomatic basis of quantum mechanics (see Hilbert space). At the same time, but independently, Dirac formulated quantum mechanics in a way that is close to an axiomatic system, as did Hermann Weyl with the assistance of Erwin Schrödinger.

In the 1930s, probability theory was put on an axiomatic basis by Andrey Kolmogorov, using measure theory.

In 1932 John von Neumann, basing on his earlier works, made an attempt to place quantum mechanics on a rigorous mathematical basis in his book Mathematical Foundations of Quantum Mechanics. While in the time of its release this was considered the most complete book about quantum mechanics, further developments made it insufficient.

Since the 1960s, following the work of Arthur Wightman and Rudolf Haag, modern quantum field theory can also be considered close to an axiomatic description.

Oscar Lanford was the first to derive the Boltzmann equation from Newtonian dynamics for sufficiently small times in 1975. In the 1990s and 2000s the limiting processes were approached by many groups of mathematicians. Main recent results are summarized by Laure Saint-Raymond, Marshall Slemrod, Alexander N. Gorban and Ilya Karlin.

In 2025, a group of mathematicians made the claim that they had derived the full set of fluid equations, including the compressible Euler and incompressible Navier-Stokes-Fourier equations, directly from Newton's laws. As of May 2025 their work is being examined by other mathematicians. This work by Yu Deng led him to win the Fields Medal in 2026.

== Status ==
Hilbert's sixth problem was a proposal to expand the axiomatic method outside the existing mathematical disciplines, to physics and beyond. This expansion requires development of semantics of physics with formal analysis of the notion of physical reality that should be done. Two fundamental theories capture the majority of the fundamental phenomena of physics:

- Quantum field theory, which provides the mathematical framework for the Standard Model;
- General relativity, which describes space-time and gravity at macroscopic scale.

Hilbert considered general relativity as an essential part of the foundation of physics. However, quantum field theory is not logically consistent with general relativity, indicating the need for a still-unknown theory of quantum gravity, where the semantics of physics is expected to play a central role. Hilbert's sixth problem thus remains open.

== See also ==
- Wightman axioms
- Constructive quantum field theory
