= CPT symmetry =

Invariance of charge, parity, & time inversion

Charge, parity, and time reversal symmetry is a fundamental symmetry of physical laws under the simultaneous transformations of charge conjugation (C), parity transformation (P), and time reversal (T). CPT is the only combination of C, P, and T that is observed to be an exact symmetry of nature at the fundamental level. The CPT theorem says that CPT symmetry holds for all physical phenomena, or more precisely, that any Lorentz invariant local quantum field theory with a Hermitian Hamiltonian must have CPT symmetry. In layman terms, this stipulates that an antimatter, mirrored, and time reversed universe would behave exactly the same as the regular universe.

== History ==
The CPT theorem appeared for the first time, implicitly, in the work of Julian Schwinger in 1951 to prove the connection between spin and statistics. In 1954, Gerhart Lüders and Wolfgang Pauli derived more explicit proofs, so this theorem is sometimes known as the Lüders–Pauli theorem. At about the same time, and independently, this theorem was also proved by John Stewart Bell. These proofs are based on the principle of Lorentz invariance and the principle of locality in the interaction of quantum fields. Subsequently, Res Jost gave a more general proof in 1958 using the framework of axiomatic quantum field theory.

Efforts during the late 1950s revealed the violation of P-symmetry by phenomena that involve the weak force, and there were well-known violations of C-symmetry as well. For a short time, the CP-symmetry was believed to be preserved by all physical phenomena, but in the 1960s that was later found to be false too, which implied, by CPT invariance, violations of T-symmetry as well.

== Derivation of the CPT theorem ==
Consider a Lorentz boost in a fixed direction z. This can be interpreted as a rotation of the time axis into the z axis, with an imaginary rotation parameter. If this rotation parameter were real, it would be possible for a 180° rotation to reverse the direction of time and of z. Reversing the direction of one axis is a reflection of space in any number of dimensions. If space has 3 dimensions, it is equivalent to reflecting all the coordinates, because an additional rotation of 180° in the x-y plane could be included.

This defines a CPT transformation if we adopt the Feynman–Stückelberg interpretation of antiparticles as the corresponding particles traveling backwards in time. This interpretation requires a slight analytic continuation, which is well-defined only under the following assumptions:

1. The theory is Lorentz invariant;
2. The vacuum is Lorentz invariant;
3. The energy is bounded below.

When the above hold, quantum theory can be extended to a Euclidean theory, defined by translating all the operators to imaginary time using the Hamiltonian. The commutation relations of the Hamiltonian, and the Lorentz generators, guarantee that Lorentz invariance implies rotational invariance, so that any state can be rotated by 180 degrees.

Since a sequence of two CPT reflections is equivalent to a 360-degree rotation, fermions change by a sign under two CPT reflections, while bosons do not. This fact can be used to prove the spin-statistics theorem.

== Consequences and implications ==
The implication of CPT symmetry is that a "mirror-image" of our universe—with all objects having their positions reflected through an arbitrary point (corresponding to a parity inversion), all momenta reversed (corresponding to a time inversion) and with all matter replaced by antimatter (corresponding to a charge inversion)—would evolve under exactly our physical laws. The CPT transformation turns our universe into its "mirror image" and vice versa. Quantum uncertainty causes the universe and antiuniverse to not be exact mirror images of each other. CPT symmetry is recognized to be a fundamental property of physical laws; but a mirror anti-universe remains theoretical.

In order to preserve this symmetry, every violation of the combined symmetry of two of its components (such as CP) must have a corresponding violation in the third component (such as T); in fact, mathematically, these are the same thing. Thus violations in T-symmetry are often referred to as CP violations.

The CPT theorem can be generalized to take into account pin groups.

In 2002 Oscar Greenberg proved that, with reasonable assumptions, CPT violation implies the breaking of Lorentz symmetry.

CPT violations would be expected by some string theory models, as well as by some other models that lie outside point-particle quantum field theory. Some proposed violations of Lorentz invariance, such as a compact dimension of cosmological size, could also lead to CPT violation. Non-unitary theories, such as proposals where black holes violate unitarity, could also violate CPT. As a technical point, fields with infinite spin could violate CPT symmetry.

The overwhelming majority of experimental searches for Lorentz violation have yielded negative results. A detailed tabulation of these results was given in 2011 by Kostelecky and Russell.

== See also ==
- Poincaré symmetry and Quantum field theory
- Parity (physics), Charge conjugation and T-symmetry
- CP violation and kaon
- IKAROS scientific results
- Gravitational interaction of antimatter § CPT theorem

== Sources ==
- Sozzi, M.S. (2008). Discrete symmetries and CP violation. Oxford University Press. ISBN 978-0-19-929666-8.
- Griffiths, David J. (1987). Introduction to Elementary Particles. Wiley, John & Sons, Inc. ISBN 978-0-471-60386-3.
- R. F. Streater and A. S. Wightman (1964). PCT, spin and statistics, and all that. Benjamin/Cummings. ISBN 978-0-691-07062-9.
