= O*-algebra =

Algebra of possibly unbounded operators

In mathematics, an O*-algebra is an algebra of possibly unbounded operators defined on a dense subspace of a Hilbert space. The original examples were described by Borchers (1962) and Uhlmann (1962), who studied some examples of O*-algebras, called Borchers algebras, arising from the Wightman axioms of quantum field theory. Powers (1971) and Lassner (1972) began the systematic study of algebras of unbounded operators.
