= Wick rotation =

Mathematical trick using imaginary numbers to simplify certain formulas in physics

In physics, Wick rotation, named after Italian physicist Gian Carlo Wick, is a method of finding a solution to a mathematical problem in Minkowski space from a solution to a related problem in Euclidean space by means of a transformation that substitutes an imaginary-number variable for a real-number variable.

Wick rotations are useful because of an analogy between two important but seemingly distinct fields of physics: statistical mechanics and quantum mechanics. In this analogy, inverse temperature plays a role in statistical mechanics formally akin to imaginary time in quantum mechanics: that is, it, where t is time and i is the imaginary unit (i^{2} = –1).

More precisely, in statistical mechanics, the Gibbs measure exp(−H/k_{B}T) describes the relative probability of the system to be in any given state at temperature T, where H is a function describing the energy of each state and k_{B} is the Boltzmann constant. In quantum mechanics, the transformation exp(−itH/ħ) describes time evolution, where H is an operator describing the energy (the Hamiltonian) and ħ is the reduced Planck constant. The former expression resembles the latter when we replace it/ħ with 1/k_{B}T, and this replacement is called Wick rotation.

Wick rotation is called a rotation because when we represent complex numbers as a plane, the multiplication of a complex number by the imaginary unit is equivalent to counter-clockwise rotating the vector representing that number by an angle of magnitude π/2 about the origin.

Instantons are Wick-rotated time solutions to certain potentials that allow for the calculation of eigenenergies and decay rates.

== Overview ==
Wick rotation is motivated by the observation that the Minkowski metric in natural units (with metric signature (− + + +) convention)

$$ds^2 = -\left(dt^2\right) + dx^2 + dy^2 + dz^2$$

and the four-dimensional Euclidean metric

$$ds^2 = d\tau^2 + dx^2 + dy^2 + dz^2$$

are equivalent if one permits the coordinate t to take on imaginary values. The Minkowski metric becomes Euclidean when t is restricted to the imaginary axis, and vice versa. Taking a problem expressed in Minkowski space with coordinates x, y, z, t, and substituting t = −iτ sometimes yields a problem in real Euclidean coordinates x, y, z, τ which is easier to solve. This solution may then, under reverse substitution, yield a solution to the original problem.

=== Statistical and quantum mechanics ===
Wick rotation connects statistical mechanics to quantum mechanics by replacing inverse temperature with imaginary time, or more precisely replacing 1/k_{B}T with it/ħ, where T is temperature, k_{B} is the Boltzmann constant, t is time, and ħ is the reduced Planck constant.

For example, consider a quantum system whose Hamiltonian H has eigenvalues E_{j}. When this system is in thermal equilibrium at temperature T, the probability of finding it in its jth energy eigenstate is proportional to exp(−E_{j}/k_{B}T). Thus, the expected value of any observable Q that commutes with the Hamiltonian is, up to a normalizing constant,

$$\sum_j Q_j e^{-\frac{E_j}{k_\text{B} T}},$$

where j runs over all energy eigenstates and Q_{j} is the value of Q in the jth eigenstate.

Alternatively, consider this system in a superposition of energy eigenstates, evolving for a time t under the Hamiltonian H. After time t, the relative phase change of the jth eigenstate is exp(−E_{j}it/ħ). Thus, the probability amplitude that a uniform (equally weighted) superposition of states

$$|\psi\rangle = \sum_j |j\rangle$$

evolves to an arbitrary superposition

$$|Q\rangle = \sum_j Q_j |j\rangle$$

is, up to a normalizing constant,

$$\left\langle Q \left| e^{-\frac{iHt}{\hbar}} \right| \psi \right\rangle =
\sum_j Q_j e^{-\frac{E_j it}{\hbar}} \langle j|j\rangle =
\sum_j Q_j e^{-\frac{E_j it}{\hbar}}.$$

Note that this formula can be obtained from the formula for thermal equilibrium by replacing 1/k_{B}T with it/ħ.

== Statics and dynamics ==
Wick rotation relates statics problems in n dimensions to dynamics problems in n − 1 dimensions, trading one dimension of space for one dimension of time. A simple example where n = 2 is a hanging spring with fixed endpoints in a gravitational field. The shape of the spring is a curve y(x). The spring is in equilibrium when the energy associated with this curve is at a critical point (an extremum); this critical point is typically a minimum, so this idea is usually called "the principle of least energy". To compute the energy, we integrate the energy spatial density over space:

$$E = \int_x \left[ k \left(\frac{dy(x)}{dx}\right)^2 + V\big(y(x)\big) \right] dx,$$

where k is the spring constant, and V(y(x)) is the gravitational potential.

The corresponding dynamics problem is that of a rock thrown upwards. The path the rock follows is that which extremalizes the action; as before, this extremum is typically a minimum, so this is called the "principle of least action". Action is the time integral of the Lagrangian:

$$S = \int_t \left[ m \left(\frac{dy(t)}{dt}\right)^2 - V\big(y(t)\big) \right] dt.$$

We get the solution to the dynamics problem (up to a factor of i) from the statics problem by Wick rotation, replacing y(x) by y(it) and the spring constant k by the mass of the rock m:

$$iS = \int_t \left[ m \left(\frac{dy(it)}{dt}\right)^2 + V\big(y(it)\big) \right] dt = i \int_t \left[ m \left(\frac{dy(it)}{dit}\right)^2 - V\big(y(it)\big) \right] d(it).$$

== Both thermal/quantum and static/dynamic ==
Taken together, the previous two examples show how the path integral formulation of quantum mechanics is related to statistical mechanics. From statistical mechanics, the shape of each spring in a collection at temperature T will deviate from the least-energy shape due to thermal fluctuations; the probability of finding a spring with a given shape decreases exponentially with the energy difference from the least-energy shape. Similarly, a quantum particle moving in a potential can be described by a superposition of paths, each with a phase exp(iS): the thermal variations in the shape across the collection have turned into quantum uncertainty in the path of the quantum particle.

== Further details ==
The Schrödinger equation and the heat equation are also related by Wick rotation.

Wick rotation also relates a quantum field theory at a finite inverse temperature β to a statistical-mechanical model over the "tube" R^{3} × S^{1} with the imaginary time coordinate τ being periodic with period β. However, there is a slight difference. Statistical-mechanical n-point functions satisfy positivity, whereas Wick-rotated quantum field theories satisfy reflection positivity.

Note, however, that the Wick rotation cannot be viewed as a rotation on a complex vector space that is equipped with the conventional norm and metric induced by the inner product, as in this case the rotation would cancel out and have no effect.

== Rigorous results ==
The Osterwalder-Schrader theorem states that, in a Minkowski-space quantum field theory that satisfies the Wightman axioms, all correlation functions admit an analytic continuation to Euclidean space. In addition, if a Euclidean QFT satisfies both the Euclidean-space Wightman axioms and a growth condition on the correlation functions, it admits an analytic continuation to Minkowski space. The same correspondence has also been shown in the context of the Haag-Kastler axioms.

Although the Wightman axioms have not been shown to hold for general quantum field theories, they have been verified for free field theories and for several special cases in low dimensions.

== See also ==
- Circular points at infinity § Imaginary transformation
- Complex spacetime
- Imaginary time
- Schwinger function
