= Gregor Wentzel =

German physicist (1898–1978)

- Born: 17 February 1898; Düsseldorf, German Empire
- Died: 12 August 1978 (aged 80); Ascona, Switzerland
- Education: University of Greifswald; Ludwig-Maximilians-Universität München
- Known for: Wentzel–Kramers–Brillouin approximation
- Children: Donat
- Awards: Max Planck Medal (1975)
- Scientific career
- Fields: Physics
- Workplaces: Ludwig-Maximilians-Universität München; Leipzig University; University of Zurich; University of Chicago
- Doctoral advisor: Arnold Sommerfeld
- Doctoral students: Valentine Bargmann; Markus Fierz; Res Jost; Nicholas Kemmer; Felix Villars

Gregor Wentzel (17 February 1898 – 12 August 1978) was a German physicist known for development of quantum mechanics. Wentzel, Hendrik Kramers, and Léon Brillouin developed the Wentzel–Kramers–Brillouin approximation in 1926. In his early years, he contributed to X-ray spectroscopy, but then broadened out to make contributions to quantum mechanics, quantum electrodynamics, superconductivity and meson theory.

== Biography ==
=== Early life and family ===
Gregor Wentzel was born in Düsseldorf, Germany, as the first of four children of Joseph and Anna Wentzel. He married Anna Lauretta Wielich and his only child, Donat Wentzel, was born in 1934. The family moved to the United States in 1948 until he and Anny returned to Ascona, Switzerland in 1970.

=== Education and academia ===
Wentzel began his university education in mathematics and physics in 1916, at the University of Freiburg. During 1917 and 1918, he served in the armed forces during World War I. He then resumed his education at the University of Freiburg until 1919, when he went to the University of Greifswald. In 1920, he went to the Ludwig-Maximilians-Universität München (LMU) to study under Arnold Sommerfeld. Wentzel was awarded his doctorate in 1921 and completed his Habilitation in 1922. He remained at LMU as a Privatdozent until he was called to Leipzig University in 1926 as an extraordinarius professor of mathematical physics.

He became ordinarius professor in the Chair for Theoretical Physics, at the University of Zurich, when he succeeded Erwin Schrödinger, in 1928, the same year Wolfgang Pauli was appointed to the ETH Zurich. Together, Wentzel and Pauli built the reputation of Zurich as a center for theoretical physics. In 1948, Wentzel took a professorship at the University of Chicago. He retired in 1970 and went to spend his last years in Ascona, Switzerland.

== Research ==
In 1926, Wentzel, Hendrik Kramers, and Léon Brillouin independently developed what became known as the Wentzel–Kramers–Brillouin approximation, also known as the WKB approximation, classical approach, and phase integral method. Wentzel is also known for his contributions to photoemission and scattering theory. Late career work includes contributions to the discussion of gauge invariant theories of superconductivity.

== Awards and honors ==
In 1975, Wentzel was awarded the Max Planck Medal.

== Bibliography ==
=== Books ===
- Gregor Wentzel. Einführung in die Quantentheorie der Wellenfelder. Franz Deuticke, 1943, 1946. Ann Arbor, Michigan: J.w. Edwards, 1943, 1946. (Translated by Charlotte Houtermans and J. M. Jauch, with an Appendix by J. M. Jauch. Quantum Theory of Fields. Interscience, 1949. Dover, 2003.) ISBN 0-486-43245-9
- Gregor Wentzel. Lectures on Strong Coupling Meson Theory at the University of Rochester. 1954.
- Gregor Wentzel and notes by K. K. Gupta. Lectures on Special Topics in Field Theory. Lectures on Mathematics and Physics: Physics. Tata Institute of Fundamental Research, 1957.
- Gregor Wentzel. Lectures on Special Topics in Quantum Mechanics. Lectures on Mathematics and Physics. Physics, 3. Tata Institute of Fundamental Research, 1965.

=== Articles ===
- Arnold Sommerfeld and Gregor Wentzel. Über reguläre und irreguläre Dublett, Zeitschrift für Physik 7 86–92 (1921) as cited in Sommerfeld Bibliography.

== See also ==
- Elastic recoil detection
- Shape resonance
