= Jost function =

In scattering theory, the Jost function is the Wronskian of the regular solution and the (irregular) Jost solution to the differential equation $-\psi''+V\psi=k^2\psi$.

It was introduced by Res Jost.

== Background ==
We are looking for solutions $\psi(k,r)$ to the radial Schrödinger equation in the case $\ell=0$,

$$-\psi''+V\psi=k^2\psi.$$

== Regular and irregular solutions ==
A regular solution $\varphi(k,r)$ is one that satisfies the boundary conditions,

$$\begin{align}
\varphi(k,0)&=0\\
\varphi_r'(k,0)&=1.
\end{align}$$

If $\int_0^\infty r|V(r)|<\infty$, the solution is given as a Volterra integral equation,

$$\varphi(k,r)=k^{-1}\sin(kr)+k^{-1}\int_0^rdr'\sin(k(r-r'))V(r')\varphi(k,r').$$

There are two irregular solutions (sometimes called Jost solutions) $f_\pm$ with asymptotic behavior $f_\pm=e^{\pm ikr}+o(1)$ as $r\to\infty$. They are given by the Volterra integral equation,

$$f_\pm(k,r)=e^{\pm ikr}-k^{-1}\int_r^\infty dr'\sin(k(r-r'))V(r')f_\pm(k,r').$$

If $k\ne0$, then $f_+,f_-$ are linearly independent. Since they are solutions to a second order differential equation, every solution (in particular $\varphi$) can be written as a linear combination of them.

== Jost function definition ==
The Jost function is

$\omega(k):=W(f_+,\varphi)\equiv\varphi_r'(k,r)f_+(k,r)-\varphi(k,r)f_{+,r}'(k,r)$,

where W is the Wronskian. Since $f_+,\varphi$ are both solutions to the same differential equation, the Wronskian is independent of r. So evaluating at $r=0$ and using the boundary conditions on $\varphi$ yields $\omega(k)=f_+(k,0)$.

== Applications ==
The Jost function can be used to construct Green's functions for

$$\left[-\frac{\partial^2}{\partial r^2}+V(r)-k^2\right]G=-\delta(r-r').$$

In fact,

$$G^+(k;r,r')=-\frac{\varphi(k,r\wedge r')f_+(k,r\vee r')}{\omega(k)},$$

where $r\wedge r'\equiv\min(r,r')$ and $r\vee r'\equiv\max(r,r')$.

The analyticity of the Jost function in the particle momentum $k$ allows to establish a relationship between the scattering phase difference with infinite and zero momenta on one hand and the number of bound states $n_{b}$, the number of Jaffe - Low primitives $n_{p}$, and the number of Castillejo - Daliz - Dyson poles $n_{\text{CDD}}$ on the other (Levinson's theorem):

$$\delta(+\infty) -  \delta(0) = - \pi ( \frac{1}{2}n_{0} + n_{b} + n_{p} - n_{\text{CDD}})$$.

Here $\delta(k)$ is the scattering phase and $n_0$ = 0 or 1. The value $n_0 = 1$ corresponds to the exceptional case of a $s$-wave scattering in the presence of a bound state with zero energy.
