= Gerhart Lüders =

German theoretical physicist

Gerhart Lüders (25 February 1920 – 31 January 1995) was a German theoretical physicist who worked mainly in quantum field theory and was well known for the discovery and a general proof of the CPT theorem. This theorem is also called the Pauli-Lüders theorem and is one of the most fundamental rules of particle physics.

== Life and works ==
Lüders was born in Hamburg. He received his physics doctorate in 1950 at the University of Hamburg and his habilitation degree in 1954 at the University of Göttingen. In the same year, he proved the CPT theorem in the particular form that for a relativistic quantum field theory the validity of parity invariance necessarily implies the validity of CT invariance. (Wolfgang Pauli, who like John Bell formulated this theorem independently of Lüders, gave a little later a more general proof.) With Bruno Zumino, Lüders in 1958 gave a rigorous proof of the so-called spin–statistics theorem and once again a proof of the CPT theorem, this time from general field theoretical axioms of the relativistic quantum field theory.

Lüders also mathematically investigated the quantum mechanical measurement process, a work that came to be known as the Lüders rule, and worked on superconductivity.

He was from 1957 to 1960 group leader at the Max Planck Institut for physics in Munich (he remained an affiliated member of the institute from 1961) and from 1960 to his retirement in 1982 professor in Göttingen.

He received in 1959 the physics prize of the Akademie der Wissenschaften zu Göttingen and in 1966 the Max Planck Medal. Since 1962 he was a member of the Akademie der Wissenschaften in Göttingen.

== See also ==
- Lüders rule
