= Levinson's theorem =

Levinson's theorem is an important theorem of scattering theory. In non-relativistic quantum mechanics, it relates the number of bound states in channels with a definite orbital momentum to the difference in phase of a scattered wave at infinite and zero momenta. It was published by Norman Levinson in 1949. The theorem applies to a wide range of potentials that increase limitedly at zero distance and decrease sufficiently fast as the distance grows.

== Statement of theorem ==
The difference in the $\ell$-wave phase shift of a scattered wave at infinite momentum, $\varphi(+\infty)$, and zero momentum, $\varphi(0)$, for a spherically symmetric potential $V(r)$ is related to the number of bound states $n_b$ by:

$$\varphi(+\infty) -  \varphi(0) = - \pi \left( \frac{1}{2}n_{0} + n_{b} \right)$$,

where $n_{0} = 0$ or $1$. The scenario $n_{0} = 1$ is uncommon and can only occur in $s$-wave scattering, if a bound state with zero energy exists. The following conditions are sufficient to guarantee the theorem:

$V(r)$ continuous in $(0,+\infty)$ except for a finite number of finite discontinuities,
$$V(r) = O(r^{ -3/2 + \varepsilon}) ~\text{ as } ~r\rightarrow 0,  ~~\varepsilon>0,$$
$$V(r) = O(r^{ -3 - \varepsilon}) ~\text{ as } ~r \rightarrow \infty,   ~~\varepsilon>0.$$

Generalizations of Levinson's theorem include tensor forces, nonlocal potentials, and relativistic effects.

In relativistic scattering theory, essential information about the system is contained in the Jost function, whose analytical properties are well defined and can be used to prove and generalize Levinson's theorem. The presence of Castillejo, Dalitz and Dyson (CDD) poles and Jaffe and Low primitives which correspond to zeros of the Jost function at the unitary cut modifies the theorem. In general case, the phase difference at infinite and zero particle momenta is determined by the number of bound states, $n_{b}$, the number of primitives, $n_{p}$, and the number of CDD poles, $n_{\text{CDD}}$:

$$\varphi(+\infty) -  \varphi(0) = - \pi \left( \frac{1}{2}n_{0} + n_{b} + n_{p} - n_{\text{CDD}}\right)$$.

The bound states and primitives give a negative contribution to the phase asymptotics, while the CDD poles give a positive contribution. In the context of potential scattering, a decrease (increase) in the scattering phase shift due to greater particle momentum is interpreted as the action of a repulsive (attractive) potential. The following universal properties of the Jost function, $\omega_J (s)$, are essential to guarantee the generalized theorem:

$\omega_J(s)$ an analytic function of the square of energy, $s$, in the center-of-mass frame of the scattered particles with a cut from threshold to infinity, $n_b$ simple zeros below the threshold, $n_p$ simple zeros above the threshold, and $n_{\text{CDD}}$ simple poles on the real axis. The zeros correspond to bound states and primitives in a fixed channel with total angular momentum $J$.
