= Linda Fierz-David =

Philologist (1891-1955)

Linda Fierz-David (1891–1964) was a German philologist and one of the first Jungian analysts in Zurich. She was the first woman admitted to the University of Basel, where she studied German philology. She met Carl Jung in 1920, becoming one of his first pupils and closest friends. She collected rare books and studied psychology, anthropology, mythology and literature.

In 2007, a critic writing for the Spanish newspaper El Pais described Fierz-David as "one of the most notable investigators of analytical psychiatry, one of the group of notable women who worked with Carl Gustav Jung in Zurich and were his disciples, and, according to the professor's wife (in a letter to Freud), "all, naturally, fell in love with him." Susan Rowland, an authority on Jung and his female acolytes, writes that "the Fierz family and the Jungs became friends" in the 1920s, and that "Jung travelled with the husband while analysing Linda on her unorthodox romantic situation: she was in love with both her husband and an Italian cousin." Rowland notes that Fierz-David was nicknamed "Sieglinde" by Jung and that she "sought to remedy Jung's inattention to the feminine perspective."

== Other activities ==
Fierz-David collected rare books and studied psychology, anthropology, mythology and literature. She was also involved in the C. G. Jung Institute, Zürich, of which she became head in 1928,

== Works ==
- The Dream of Poliphilo: The Soul in Love, New York: Pantheon Books, 1950. Translated by Mary Hottinger. The book is a paraphrase and interpretation of the Hypnerotomachia, a fifteenth-century work by Francesco Colonna. Jung wrote the foreword.
- Villa of Mysteries, 1957. This book, also published under the title Women's Dionysian Initiation: The Villa of Mysteries in Pompeii, is a Jungian analysis of the mystery chamber in the Roman city of Pompeii, whose frescos depict an initiation ceremony for women. It was later published together with a text by Nor Hall under the title Dreaming in Red: The Women's Dionysian Initiation Chamber in Pompeii.

A 2007 review of Villa of Mysteries for the Spanish newspaper El Pais emphasized that it is "not a work of philology or history" but rather a "very Jungian" volume that seems to interpret not just a particular set of frescoes in a particular city but to expand its analysis to all of Roman culture on the understanding that what happened in Pompeii also happened elsewhere in the Empire. Part of a "rich and colorful world of wealthy patrician houses and brothels," the Villa of the Mysteries was a place where women were initiated into "the secret – and complex – rites of Bacchus and Ariadne, under the sign of Orpheus." Fierz-David examines the way in which this initiation process involves the workings of the subconscious and the awareness of "the hidden and terrifying side of God," and her interpretation, while "closely linked to Jungian psychoanalysis," continually brings to bear a "very rich knowledge of classical mythology."

== Personal life ==
Fierz-David was married to Hans Eduard Fierz (1882-1953), a professor of chemistry at the Technical University in Zurich and author of History of Chemistry (1945). Their son Markus Fierz, born in 1912 in Basle, was a physicist. His twin brother Heinrich-Karl Fierz also studied with Jung, trained at the Burghölzli Mental Hospital in Zurich under H. W. Maier and Manfred Bleuler, and wrote his doctoral dissertation on electroshock therapy. The younger Heinrich worked as a psychiatrist at the Binswanger Clinic, Sanatorium Bellevue, and in 1964 co-founded the Klinik am Zürichberg, serving as its first medical director.
