= Albert Einstein Medal =

Science award

The Albert Einstein Medal is an award presented by the Albert Einstein Society in Bern. First given in 1979, the award is presented to people for "scientific findings, works, or publications related to Albert Einstein" each year.

== Recipients ==
Source: Einstein Society

- 2025: Robert Wald
- 2024: George Efstathiou
- 2023: Luc Blanchet
- 2020: Event Horizon Telescope (EHT) scientific collaboration
- 2019: Clifford Martin Will
- 2018: Juan Martín Maldacena
- 2017: LIGO Scientific Collaboration and the Virgo Collaboration
- 2016: Alexei Yuryevich Smirnov
- 2015: Stanley Deser, Charles Misner
- 2014: Tom W. B. Kibble
- 2013: Roy Kerr
- 2012: Alain Aspect
- 2011: Adam Riess, Saul Perlmutter
- 2010: Hermann Nicolai
- 2009: Kip Stephen Thorne
- 2008: Beno Eckmann
- 2007: Reinhard Genzel
- 2006: Gabriele Veneziano
- 2005: Murray Gell-Mann
- 2004: Michel Mayor
- 2003: George F. Smoot
- 2001: Johannes Geiss, Hubert Reeves
- 2000: Gustav Tammann
- 1999: Friedrich Hirzebruch
- 1998: Claude Nicollier
- 1996: Thibault Damour
- 1995: Chen Ning Yang
- 1994: Irwin Shapiro
- 1993: Max Flückiger, Adolf Meichle
- 1992: Peter Bergmann
- 1991: Joseph Hooton Taylor, Jr.
- 1990: Roger Penrose
- 1989: Markus Fierz
- 1988: John Archibald Wheeler
- 1987: Jeanne Hersch
- 1986: Rudolf Mössbauer
- 1985: Edward Witten
- 1984: Victor Weisskopf
- 1983: Hermann Bondi
- 1982: Friedrich Traugott Wahlen
- 1979: Stephen Hawking

== See also ==
- Albert Einstein Award, Lewis and Rosa Strauss Memorial Fund
- Albert Einstein World Award of Science, World Cultural Council
- Einstein Prize, American Physical Society
- List of physics awards
- UNESCO Albert Einstein medal, United Nations Educational, Scientific and Cultural Organization
