= Oscar Lanford =

American mathematician

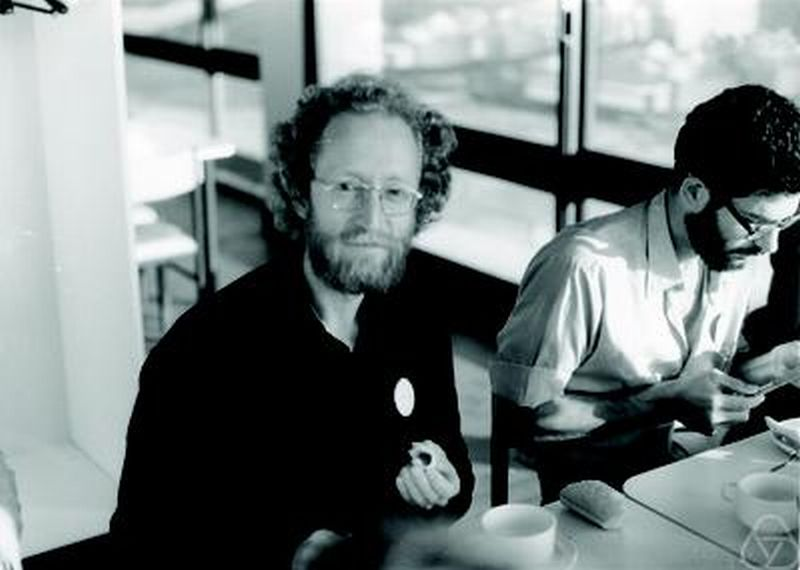
- Born: January 9, 1940; New York City, US
- Died: November 16, 2013 (aged 73)
- Education: Princeton University; Wesleyan University
- Scientific career
- Fields: Mathematical physics
- Workplaces: University of California, Berkeley; Institut des Hautes Études Scientifiques; ETH Zürich
- Doctoral advisor: Arthur Wightman

Oscar Erasmus Lanford III (January 6, 1940 – November 16, 2013) was an American mathematician working on mathematical physics and dynamical systems theory.

== Professional career ==
Born in New York, Lanford was awarded his undergraduate degree from Wesleyan University and the Ph.D. from Princeton University in 1966 under the supervision of Arthur Wightman. He has served as a professor of mathematics at the University of California, Berkeley, and a professor of physics at the Institut des Hautes Études Scientifiques (IHES) in Bures-sur-Yvette, France (1982-1989). Since 1987, he was with the department of mathematics, Swiss Federal Institute of Technology Zürich (ETH Zürich) till his retirement. After his retirement, he taught occasionally in New York University.

== The Boltzmann equation ==
Lanford proved in 1975 the validity of the Boltzmann equation in a gas of particles under the laws of classical mechanics on short kinetic time scales. In a 2025 preprint, Lanford's result was substantially improved by Yu Deng, Zaher Hani, and Xiao Ma, resolving the aspect of Hilbert's sixth problem which addressed Boltzmann's problem.

== Proof of the rigidity conjectures ==
Lanford gave the first proof that the Feigenbaum-Cvitanovic functional equation

$$g(x) = T(g)(x) = (1/\lambda) g(g(\lambda x)), g(0)=1, g''(0)<0,\lambda=g(1)<0$$

has an even analytic solution g and that this fixed point g of the Feigenbaum renormalisation operator T is hyperbolic with a one-dimensional unstable manifold. This provided the first mathematical proof of the rigidity conjectures of Feigenbaum. The proof was computer assisted. The hyperbolicity of the fixed point is essential to explain the Feigenbaum universality observed experimentally by Mitchell Feigenbaum and Coullet-Tresser. Feigenbaum has studied the logistic family and looked at the sequence of Period doubling bifurcations. Amazingly the asymptotic behavior near the accumulation point appeared universal in the sense that the same numerical values would appear. The logistic family $f(x) = c x(1-x)$ of maps on the interval [0,1] for example would lead to the same asymptotic law of the ratio of the differences $b(n) = a(n+1)-a(n)$ between the bifurcation values a(n) than $f(x) = c \sin(\pi x)$. The result is that $\lim_{n \to \infty} b(n)/b(n+1)$ converges to the Feigenbaum constants $d=4.6692016091029...$ which is a "universal number" independent of the map f. The bifurcation diagram has become an icon of chaos theory.

Campanino and Epstein also gave a proof of the fixed point without computer assistance but did not establish its hyperbolicity. They cite in their paper Lanford's computer assisted proof. There are also lecture notes of Lanford from 1979 in Zurich and announcements in 1980. The hyperbolicity is essential to verify the picture discovered numerically by Feigenbaum and independently by Coullet and Tresser. Lanford later gave a shorter proof using the Leray-Schauder fixed point theorem but establishing only the fixed point without the hyperbolicity. Work of Dennis Sullivan later showed that the fixed point is unique in the class of real valued quadratic like germs. Mikhail Lyubich published in 1999 the first not computer assisted proof of the fixed point which also establishes hyperbolicity.

== Awards and honors ==
Lanford was the recipient of the 1986 United States National Academy of Sciences award in Applied Mathematics and Numerical Analysis and holds an honorary doctorate from Wesleyan University.

In 2012 he became a fellow of the American Mathematical Society.

=== Selected publications ===
- Lanford, Oscar (1982), "A computer-assisted proof of the Feigenbaum conjectures", Bull. Amer. Math. Soc. (N.S.), 6 (3): 427–434, doi:10.1090/S0273-0979-1982-15008-X
- Lanford, O.E (1984), "A Shorter Proof of the Existence of the Feigenbaum Fixed Point", Comm. Math. Phys., 96 (4): 521–538, Bibcode:1984CMaPh..96..521L, doi:10.1007/BF01212533, S2CID 121613330
- Lanford, Oscar (1984), "Computer-assisted Proofs in analysis" (PDF), Physica A, 124 (1–3): 465–470, Bibcode:1984PhyA..124..465L, doi:10.1016/0378-4371(84)90262-0

== See also ==
- Dobrushin-Lanford-Ruelle equations
