= Stephen B. Streater =

British technology entrepreneur (born 1965)

- Born: Stephen Bernard Streater; 1965 (age 60–61)
- Occupation: Technology entrepreneur
- Years active: 1990–present

Stephen Bernard Streater (born 1965) is a British technology entrepreneur.

== Career ==
In 1990, he co-founded Eidos, a company specialising in video compression and non-linear editing systems, particularly for computers running the RISC OS operating system. He later sold and left Eidos, which had moved into the video game market.

== Personal life ==
Streater is married to Victoria Jane (née Fantl) and has three daughters. Streater's father, Ray Streater, is a professor of mathematics at King's College London.
