= Eduard Prugovečki =

Canadian physicist and mathematician

Eduard Prugovečki (March 19, 1937 – October 13, 2003) was a Canadian physicist and mathematician of Croatian-Romanian descent.

Prugovečki was born in Craiova, Romania to a Romanian mother, Helena (née Piatkowski), and Croatian father, Slavoljub. He completed the first four years of secondary education in Bucharest, before his family was forced to relocate to Zagreb in 1951, due to an anti-Yugoslav campaign by the communist authorities. He finished high school there and proceeded to study physics at the University of Zagreb, getting his diploma in 1959. He joined the Department of Theoretical Physics at the Institute Ruđer Bošković in Zagreb, where he worked as a research assistant until 1961.

In 1961, as the best student of his generation in Zagreb, Prugovečki was sent to Princeton University, New Jersey, United States. He wrote his doctoral thesis under the direction of theoretical physicist Arthur Wightman, and earned his PhD from Princeton in 1964. In 1965, he moved to Canada, where he first spent two years as a postdoctoral fellow at the Institute for Theoretical Physics in Edmonton, Alberta, and then a year as a lecturer at the University of Alberta.

He taught mathematical physics at the University of Toronto from 1967 to 1997. In 1974, he spent one year as a visiting professor at the Centre national de la recherche scientifique in Marseille, France. Around 1986 he resigned from his membership in the International Association of Mathematical Physics.

His research interests were quantum field theory, unification of theory of relativity and quantum theory and quantum gravity. He introduced the concept of informational completeness.

In 1998 he retired to live in Honey Harbour, Ontario. Prugovečki died at the age of 66 at his home at Lake Chapala, Mexico.

== Works ==
- Quantum Mechanics in Hilbert Space, Academic Press 1971, ISBN 0-12-566050-2
- Stochastic Quantum Mechanics and Quantum Spacetime, Kluwer 1984, ISBN 90-277-1617-X
- Quantum Geometry, Kluwer 1992
- Principles of Quantum General Relativity, World Scientific 1995, ISBN 981-02-2138-X
- Janko Herak (editor), Distinguished Croatian Scientists in America, Part Two, ISBN 953-97325-1-4
