= Constructive quantum field theory =

Formalization of quantum field theory

In mathematical physics, constructive quantum field theory is the field devoted to showing that quantum field theory can be defined in terms of precise mathematical structures. This demonstration requires new mathematics, in a sense analogous to classical real analysis, putting calculus on a mathematically rigorous foundation. Weak, strong, and electromagnetic forces of nature are believed to have their natural description in terms of quantum fields.

Attempts to put quantum field theory on a basis of completely defined concepts have involved most branches of mathematics, including functional analysis, differential equations, probability theory, representation theory, geometry, and topology. It is known that a quantum field is inherently hard to handle using conventional mathematical techniques like explicit estimates. This is because a quantum field has the general nature of an operator-valued distribution, a type of object from mathematical analysis. The existence theorems for quantum fields can be expected to be very difficult to find, if indeed they are possible at all.

One discovery of the theory that can be related in non-technical terms, is that the dimension d of the spacetime involved is crucial. Notable work in the field by James Glimm and Arthur Jaffe showed that with d < 4 many examples can be found. Along with work of their students, coworkers, and others, constructive field theory resulted in a mathematical foundation and exact interpretation to what previously was only a set of recipes, also in the case d < 4.

Theoretical physicists had given these rules the name "renormalization," but most physicists had been skeptical about whether they could be turned into a mathematical theory. Today one of the most important open problems, both in theoretical physics and in mathematics, is to establish similar results for gauge theory in the realistic case d = 4.

The traditional basis of constructive quantum field theory is the set of Wightman axioms. Konrad Osterwalder and Robert Schrader showed that there is an equivalent problem in mathematical probability theory. The examples with d < 4 satisfy the Wightman axioms as well as the Osterwalder–Schrader axioms. They also fall in the related framework introduced by Rudolf Haag and Daniel Kastler, called algebraic quantum field theory. There is a firm belief in the physics community that the gauge theory of C.N. Yang and Robert Mills (the Yang–Mills theory) can lead to a tractable theory, but new ideas and new methods will be required to actually establish this, and this could take many years.

== See also ==
- Axiomatic quantum field theory
