= Donat Wentzel =

American astrophysicist (1934–2013)

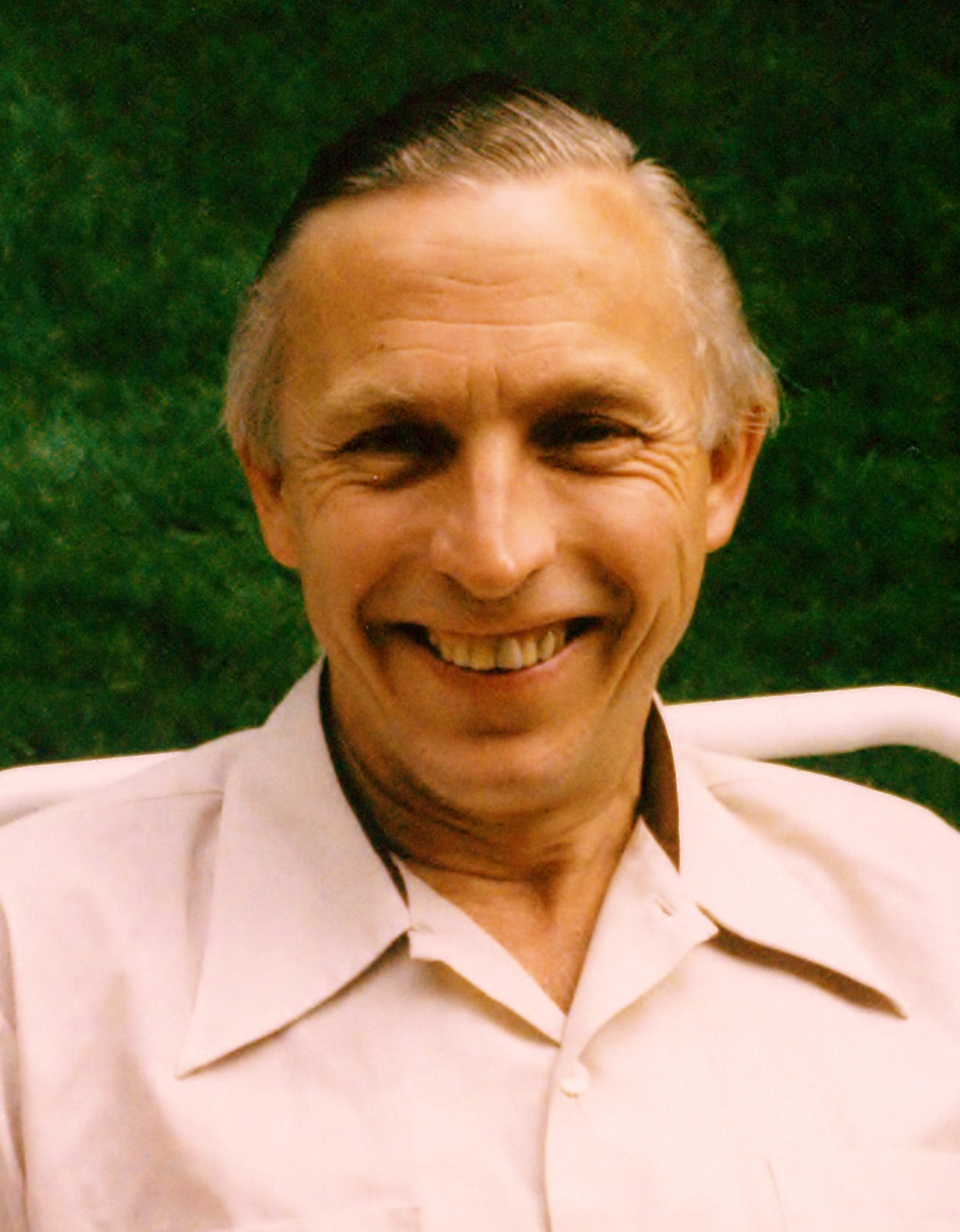
- Donat "Don" G. Wentzel in 1985
- Born: June 25, 1934; Zürich, Switzerland
- Died: February 20, 2013 (aged 78); Glenwood, Maryland, USA
- Education: University of Chicago
- Father: Gregor Wentzel
- Awards: George Van Biesbroeck Prize (2003)
- Scientific career
- Fields: Astrophysics
- Workplaces: University of Chicago; University of Michigan; University of Maryland
- Thesis: Hydrodynamic Equilibria (1960)
- Doctoral advisor: Subrahmanyan Chandrasekhar

Donat G. Wentzel (June 25, 1934 – February 20, 2013) was an American astrophysicist. He is best known as astronomy educator of undergraduates, graduates, and young researchers.

A graduate of the University of Chicago, he established himself in plasma astrophysics, working on cosmic magnetism and electrical currents flowing both between the stars and on the Sun. His outstanding contribution was on Alfven waves driven by cosmic rays and the emission processes of solar flares at radio waves. His book on the “Restless Sun,” written for undergraduates, was named Book of the Year by the Astronomical Society of the Pacific in 1989. Wentzel received 2003 the George Van Biesbroeck Prize. His nomination reads: "For outstanding and sustained contributions during three decades to astronomy education in this country."

== Life and education ==
Donat Wentzel was born in Zürich, Switzerland, as the only child of Anny and Gregor Wentzel. In 1948 the family moved to Chicago, where Donat Wentzel received the rest of his schooling up to the Ph.D. 1959 he married Maria Mayer, the daughter of Maria Goeppert Mayer. They are survived by one daughter.

== Teaching ==
Wentzel developed an astronomy course for college students who would not be majoring in a science. This course at one time attracted over 3000 students per year at the University of Maryland. As part of this course, he developed student activities based on astronomical photographs. He stimulated similar courses nationally and internationally, supporting the teaching of astronomy as a medium for science education in scientifically developing countries. On behalf of the International Astronomical Union, he organized and/or participated as faculty of eight International Schools for Young Astronomers, supervised a visiting-lecturer program in Peru and Paraguay, and helped to develop astronomy in China, Egypt, India, Indonesia, Vietnam, Iran, Morocco, Central America, Malaysia, Romania, Sri Lanka, and the Philippines. In 1975 Wentzel received the Teaching of Science award by the Washington Academy of Sciences.
