= Klaus Hepp =

Swiss theoretical physicist

- Klaus Hepp (1997)
- Born: 11 December 1936 (age 89); Kiel, Germany
- Education: ETH Zurich
- Awards: Max Planck Medal (2004)
- Scientific career
- Fields: Theoretical physics
- Workplaces: ETH Zurich
- Doctoral advisor: Res Jost
- Doctoral students: Jürg Fröhlich; Konrad Osterwalder; José Fernando Perez; Walter F. Wreszinski

Klaus Hepp (born 11 December 1936) is a German-born Swiss theoretical physicist working mainly in quantum field theory. Hepp studied mathematics and physics at Westfälischen Wilhelms-Universität in Münster and at the Eidgenössischen Technischen Hochschule (ETH Zurich), where, in 1962, with Res Jost as thesis first advisor and Markus Fierz as thesis second advisor, he received a doctorate for the thesis ("Kovariante analytische Funktionen“) and at ETH in 1963 attained the rank of Privatdozent. From 1966 until his retirement in 2002 he was professor of theoretical physics there. From 1964 to 1966 he was at the Institute for Advanced Study in Princeton, New Jersey. Hepp was also Loeb Lecturer at Harvard University and was at the Institut des Hautes Études Scientifiques (IHÉS) near Paris.

Hepp worked on relativistic quantum field theory, quantum statistical mechanics, and theoretical laser physics. In quantum field theory he gave a complete proof of the Bogoliubov–Parasyuk renormalization theorem (Hepp and Wolfhart Zimmermann, called in their honor the BPHZ theorem). Since a research stay 1975/6 at the Massachusetts Institute of Technology (MIT) he also worked in neuroscience (for example, reciprocal effect between movement sensors, visual sense and eye movements with V. Henn in Zurich).

In 2004 he received the Max Planck Medal.

== Selected works ==
- “Renormalisaton Theory“, in de Witt, Stora „Statistical Mechanics and Quantum Field Theory“, Gordon and Breach, New York 1971
- “Progress in Quantum Field Theory“, Erice Lectures 1972
- “Theorie de la Renormalisation“, Springer 1970
- “On the quantum mechanical N-body problem“, Helvetica physica Acta, Bd.42, 1969, S.425
- “On the connection between Wightman and LSZ quantum field theory“, in Chretien, Deser „Axiomatic Quantum Field Theory“, New York 1966
- "Quantum mechanics in the brain" (with Christof Koch) in Nature 440(611), 2006

== See also ==
- Dicke model
- Gell-Mann and Low theorem
- Mean-field particle methods
- Orchestrated objective reduction
- Superradiant phase transition
- Wightman axioms
