= Markus Fierz =

Swiss physicist (1912–2006)

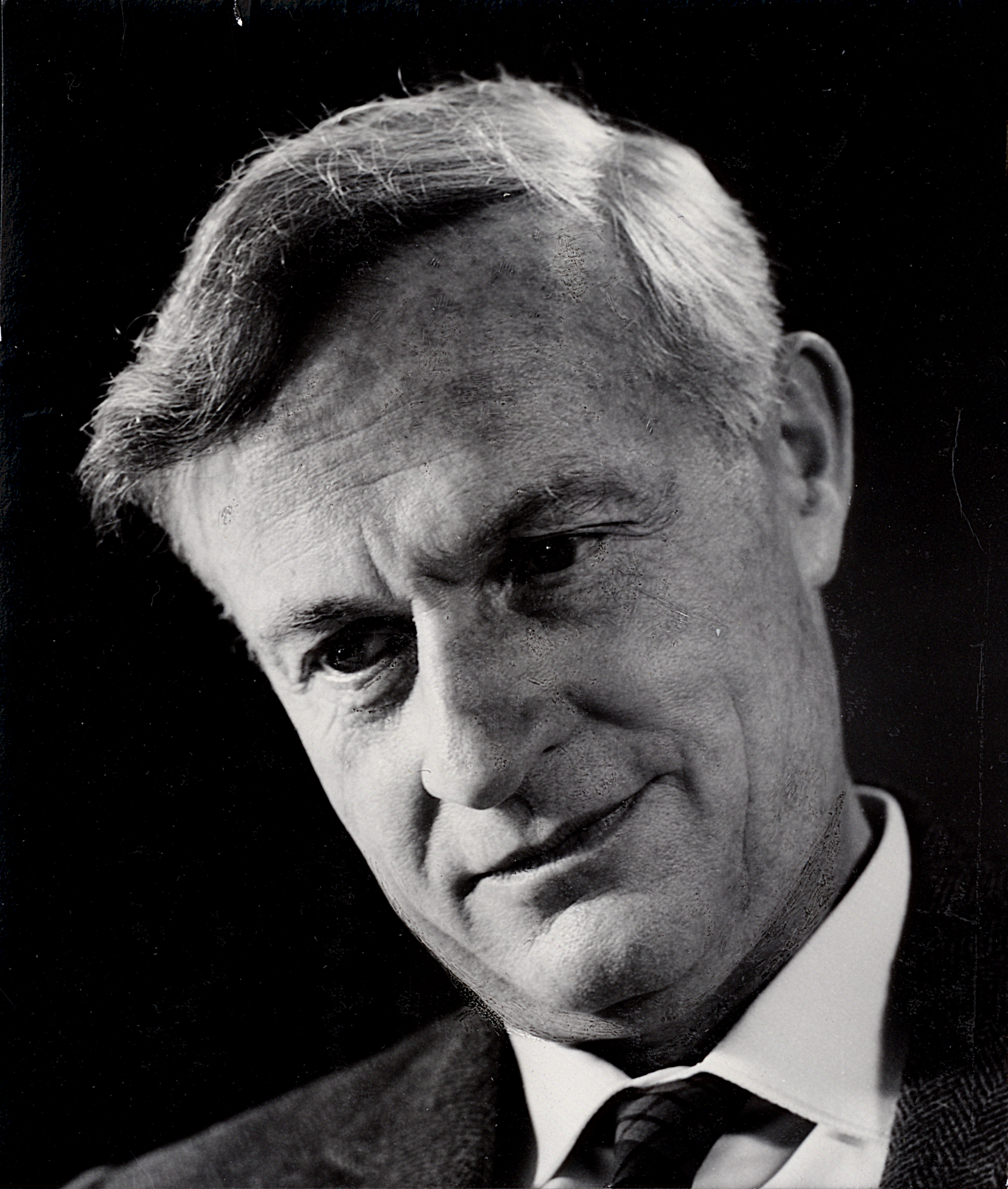
- Markus Fierz, c. 1975
- Born: 20 June 1912; Basel, Switzerland
- Died: 20 June 2006 (aged 94); Küsnacht, Zurich, Switzerland
- Citizenship: Switzerland
- Known for: Spin–statistics theorem Massive gravity Fierz identity
- Spouse: Menga Biber
- Awards: Max Planck Medal (1979); Albert Einstein Medal (1989)
- Scientific career
- Fields: Physicist
- Institutions: ETH Zurich in Zürich; University of Basel in Basel; CERN
- Doctoral advisor: Gregor Wentzel
- Other academic advisors: Wolfgang Pauli
- Doctoral students: Klaus Hepp, Peter Minkowski

Markus Eduard Fierz (20 June 1912 – 20 June 2006) was a Swiss physicist, particularly remembered for his formulation of spin–statistics theorem, and for his contributions to the development of quantum theory, particle physics, and statistical mechanics. He was awarded the Max Planck Medal in 1979 and the Albert Einstein Medal in 1989 for all his work.

== Biography ==
Fierz's father Hans Eduard Fierz was a chemist with Geigy and later a professor at ETH Zurich, his mother was Linda Fierz-David. Fierz studied at the Realgymnasium in Zurich. In 1931 he began his studies in Göttingen, where he listened to the lectures of prolific academics including Hermann Weyl. In 1933 he returned to Zurich and studied physics at ETH under Wolfgang Pauli and Gregor Wentzel. In 1936 he earned a doctoral degree with his thesis on the infrared catastrophe in quantum electrodynamics. Afterward he went to Werner Heisenberg in Leipzig and in 1936 became an assistant to Wolfgang Pauli in Zurich. For his habilitation degree in 1939 he treated in his thesis relativistic fields with arbitrary spins (with and without mass) and proved the spin-statistics theorem for free fields. For quantum electrodynamics the work was extended. The work on relativistic fields with arbitrary spins was later important in supergravity. In 1940 he became Privatdozent in Basel and 1943 assistant professor. From 1944 to 1959 he was a professor for theoretical physics in Basel. In 1950 he was at the Institute for Advanced Study in Princeton, where he met Res Jost. In 1959 he led the theoretical physics department at CERN in Geneva for one year and in 1960 he became the successor of his teacher Pauli at ETH. In 1977 he retired there as an emeritus professor. Fierz also worked on gravitational theory but published only one paper on the subject.

In 1940 he married Menga Biber; they became acquainted through making music (he played the violin). They had two sons.

== Publications ==
- Fierz, M. (1939), "Über die relativistische Theorie kräftefreier Teilchen mit beliebigem Spin", Helv. Phys. Acta (in German), 12 (1): 3–37, Bibcode:1939AcHPh..12....3F, doi:10.5169/seals-110930(pdf download available)
- Fierz, M.; Pauli, W. (1939), "On relativistic wave equations for particles of arbitrary spin in an electromagnetic field", Proc. R. Soc. A, 173 (953): 211–232, Bibcode:1939RSPSA.173..211F, doi:10.1098/rspa.1939.0140
- Fierz, M. (1949). ""Title" Zur Theorie der Multipolstrahlung". Helv. Phys. Acta. 22: 489.
- Fierz, M. (1956). "Über die physikalische Deutung der erweiterten Gravitationstheorie P. Jordans". Helv. Phys. Acta. 29: 128.
- M. Fierz, ’Spinors’, in Proceedings of the International Conference on Relativistic Theories of Gravitation, London, July 1965, H. Bondi ed., King's College, University of London, 1965
- Fierz, M. (1964). "Warum gibt es keine magnetischen Ladungen?". Helv. Phys. Acta. 37: 663.
- M. Fierz, ’Die unitären Darstellungen der homogenen Lorentzgruppe’, in Preludes in theoretical physics, in honor of V. F. Weisskopf, A. de-Shalit, H. Feshbach and L. van Hove (eds.), North Holland, Amsterdam, 1966; ASIN B0006BNIZ2
- M. Fierz, Vorlesungen zur Entwicklungsgeschichte der Mechanik. Springer 1972; ISBN 978-3-540-37606-4

== See also ==
- Fierz completeness relations
- Relativistic wave equations
