= Res Jost =

Swiss theoretical physicist

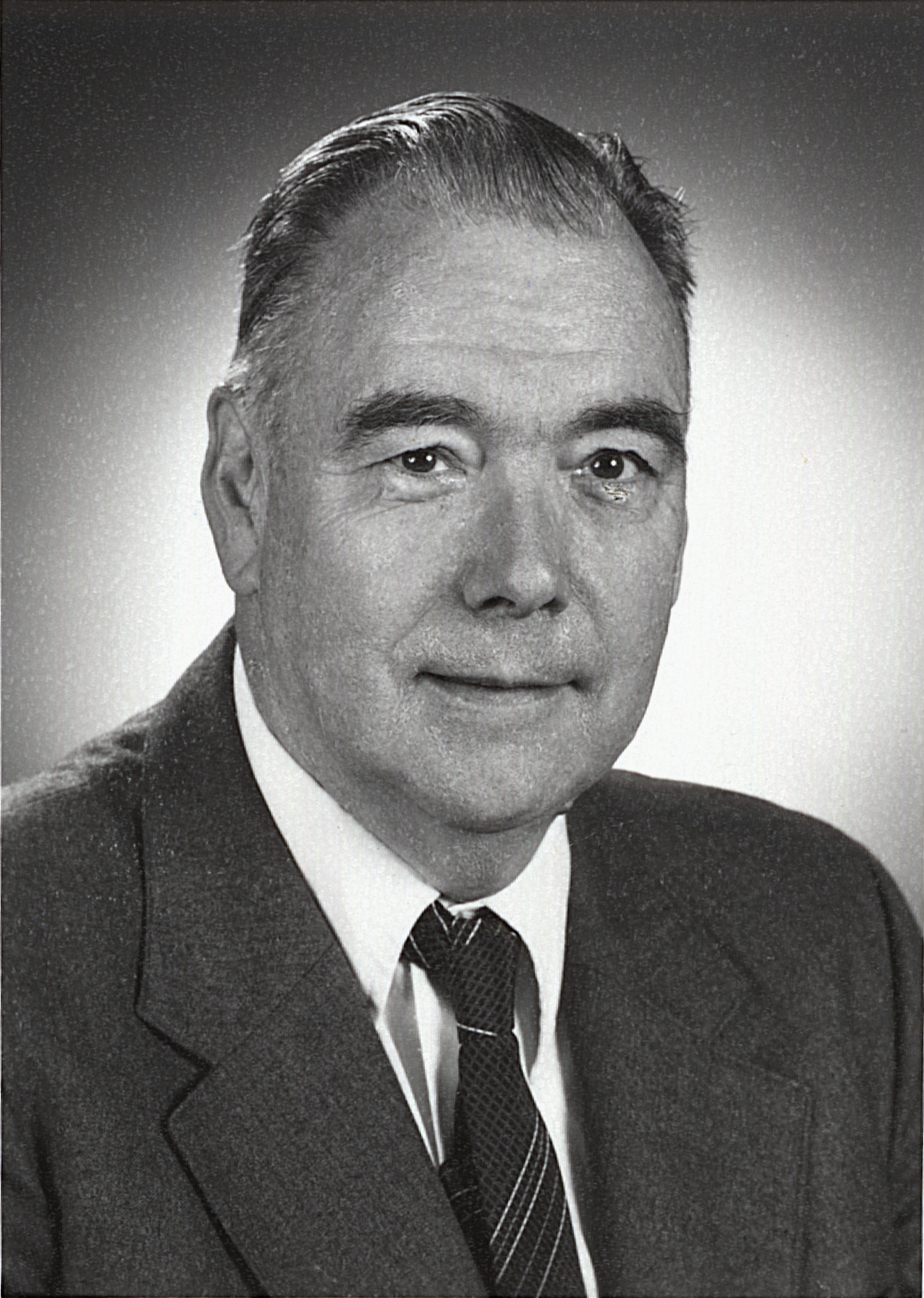
- Born: 10 January 1918; Bern, Switzerland
- Died: 3 October 1990 (aged 72); Zurich, Switzerland
- Education: University of Zurich
- Known for: Jost function
- Awards: Max Planck medal (1984)
- Scientific career
- Fields: Theoretical physics
- Workplaces: ETH Zurich
- Thesis: Zur Ladungsabhängigkeit der Kernkräfte in der Vektormesontheorie ohne neutrale Mesonen (1946)
- Doctoral advisor: Gregor Wentzel
- Doctoral students: Sergio Albeverio; Klaus Hepp; Walter Hunziker; Konrad Osterwalder; David Ruelle; Eduard Zehnder

Res Jost (10 January 1918 – 3 October 1990) was a Swiss theoretical physicist, who worked mainly in constructive quantum field theory.

== Biography ==
Res Jost was born on January 10, 1918, in Bern. He is the son of the physics teacher Wilhelm Jost and Hermine Spycher. In 1949 Jost married the Viennese physicist Hilde Fleischer. Jost studied in Bern and at the University of Zurich, where he received his doctorate in 1946 under the supervision of the German physicist Gregor Wentzel. He then spent half a year with Niels Bohr in Copenhagen, where he introduced the Jost function into scattering theory. Afterwards, he worked as an assistant of Wolfgang Pauli in Zurich. From 1949 to 1955 he was at the Institute for Advanced Study in Princeton, where he worked with Walter Kohn, Joaquin Mazdak Luttinger and Abraham Pais among others. From 1955, he was associate professor for theoretical physics at ETH and starting from 1959 full professor. In 1964, he and Rudolf Haag created the journal Communications in Mathematical Physics. He died on October 3, 1990, in Zurich.

Jost researched quantum-mechanical scattering theory (also inverse scattering theory: Reconstruction of potentials from scattering data) and the mathematical quantum field theory, where he in 1958 with the methods of Arthur Strong Wightman proved the PCT theorem and in 1957 introduced the Jost–Lehmann–Dyson representation (named after Jost, Harry Lehmann and Freeman Dyson), an integral representation of the expectancy value of the commutator of two field operators.

== Honors and awards ==
Since 1977 Jost was corresponding member of the United States National Academy of Sciences. In 1984 Jost received the Max Planck Medal for outstanding achievements in theoretical physics.

== Selected works ==
- Jost, Res (1965). The general theory of quantized fields. Vol. 4. American Mathematical Society. ASIN B0007DUAUK.
- Jost, Res (1995). Hepp, Klaus; Hunziker, Walter; Kohn, Walter (eds.). Das Märchen vom Elfenbeinernen Turm. Reden und Aufsätze. Lecture Notes in Physics Monographs (in German). Vol. 34. Springer-Verlag Berlin Heidelberg. doi:10.1007/978-3-540-49276-4. ISBN 978-3540492764.
- Jost, Res; Schneider, Walter (1969). Quantenmechanik: nach Vorlesungen im Wintersemester 1966/67 (in German). Vereins der Mathematiker und Physiker an der ETH Zürich.
- Jost, Res; Italian Physical Society, eds. (1969). Local quantum theory. Vol. 45. Academic Press. ISBN 9780123688453.
- Jost, Res (1984). "Erinnerungen: Erlesenes und Erlebtes". Physikalische Blätter (in German). 40 (7): 178–181. doi:10.1002/phbl.19840400706.

== See also ==
- Axiomatic quantum field theory
- Communications in Mathematical Physics
- Constructive quantum field theory
- CPT symmetry
- Edge-of-the-wedge theorem
- Inverse scattering transform
- Jost function
- Quantum field theory
