= Wightman axioms =

Axiomatization of quantum field theory

In mathematical physics, the Wightman axioms, also called the Gårding–Wightman axioms, named after Arthur Wightman, are an attempt at a mathematically rigorous formulation of quantum field theory. Arthur Wightman formulated the axioms in the early 1950s, but they were first published only in 1964 with Lars Gårding after Haag–Ruelle scattering theory by Rudolf Haag and David Ruelle affirmed their significance.

The axioms exist in the context of constructive quantum field theory and are meant to provide a basis for rigorous treatment of quantum fields and strict foundation for the perturbative methods used. One of the Millennium Problems is to realize the Wightman axioms in the case of Yang–Mills fields.

== Rationale ==
One basic idea of the Wightman axioms is that there is a Hilbert space, upon which the Poincaré group acts unitarily. In this way, the concepts of energy, momentum, angular momentum and center of mass (corresponding to boosts) are implemented.

There is also a stability assumption, which restricts the spectrum of the four-momentum to the positive light cone (and its boundary). However, this is not enough to implement locality. For that, the Wightman axioms have position-dependent operators called quantum fields, which form covariant representations of the Poincaré group.

Since quantum field theory suffers from ultraviolet problems, the value of a field at a point is not well-defined. To get around this, the Wightman axioms introduce the idea of smearing over a test function to tame the UV divergences, which arise even in a free field theory. Because the axioms are dealing with unbounded operators, the domains of the operators have to be specified.

The Wightman axioms restrict the causal structure of the theory by imposing either commutativity or anticommutativity between spacelike separated fields.

They also postulate the existence of a Poincaré-invariant state called the vacuum and demand it to be unique. Moreover, the axioms assume that the vacuum is "cyclic", i.e., that the set of all vectors obtainable by evaluating at the vacuum-state elements of the polynomial algebra generated by the smeared field operators is a dense subset of the whole Hilbert space.

Lastly, there is the primitive causality restriction, which states that any polynomial in the smeared fields can be arbitrarily accurately approximated (i.e. is the limit of operators in the weak topology) by polynomials in smeared fields over test functions with support in an open set in Minkowski space whose causal closure is the whole Minkowski space.

== Axioms ==
=== W0 (assumptions of relativistic quantum mechanics) ===
Quantum mechanics is described according to von Neumann; in particular, the pure states are given by the rays, i.e. the one-dimensional subspaces, of some separable complex Hilbert space. In the following, the scalar product of Hilbert space vectors Ψ and Φ is denoted by $\langle\Psi, \Phi\rangle$, and the norm of Ψ is denoted by $\lVert\Psi\rVert$. The transition probability between two pure states [Ψ] and [Φ] can be defined in terms of non-zero vector representatives Ψ and Φ to be

$$P\big([\Psi], [\Phi]\big) = \frac{|\langle \Psi, \Phi\rangle|^2}{\lVert\Psi\rVert^2 \lVert\Phi\rVert^2}$$

and is independent of which representative vectors Ψ and Φ are chosen.

The theory of symmetry is described according to Wigner. This is to take advantage of the successful description of relativistic particles by E. P. Wigner in his famous paper of 1939; see Wigner's classification. Wigner postulated the transition probability between states to be the same to all observers related by a transformation of special relativity. More generally, he considered the statement that a theory be invariant under a group G to be expressed in terms of the invariance of the transition probability between any two rays. The statement postulates that the group acts on the set of rays, that is, on projective space. Let (a, L) be an element of the Poincaré group (the inhomogeneous Lorentz group). Thus, a is a real Lorentz four-vector representing the change of spacetime origin x ↦ x − a, where x is in the Minkowski space M^{4}, and L is a Lorentz transformation, which can be defined as a linear transformation of four-dimensional spacetime preserving the Lorentz distance c^{2}t^{2} − x⋅x of every vector (ct, x). Then the theory is invariant under the Poincaré group if for every ray Ψ of the Hilbert space and every group element (a, L) is given a transformed ray Ψ(a, L) and the transition probability is unchanged by the transformation:

$$\langle \Psi(a, L), \Phi(a, L) \rangle = \langle\Psi, \Phi\rangle.$$

Wigner's theorem says that under these conditions, the transformation on the Hilbert space are either linear or anti-linear operators (if moreover they preserve the norm, then they are unitary or antiunitary operators); the symmetry operator on the projective space of rays can be lifted to the underlying Hilbert space. This being done for each group element (a, L), we get a family of unitary or antiunitary operators U(a, L) on our Hilbert space, such that the ray Ψ transformed by (a, L) is the same as the ray containing U(a, L)ψ. If we restrict attention to elements of the group connected to the identity, then the anti-unitary case does not occur.

Let (a, L) and (b, M) be two Poincaré transformations, and let us denote their group product by (a, L)⋅(b, M); from the physical interpretation we see that the ray containing U(a, L)[U(b, M)ψ] must (for any ψ) be the ray containing U((a, L)⋅(b, M))ψ (associativity of the group operation). Going back from the rays to the Hilbert space, these two vectors may differ by a phase (and not in norm, because we choose unitary operators), which can depend on the two group elements (a, L) and (b, M), i.e. we do not have a representation of a group but rather a projective representation. These phases cannot always be cancelled by redefining each U(a), example for particles of spin 1/2. Wigner showed that the best one can get for Poincare group is

$$U(a, L) U(b, M) = \pm U\big((a, L) \cdot (b, M)\big),$$

i.e. the phase is a multiple of $\pi$. For particles of integer spin (pions, photons, gravitons, ...) one can remove the ± sign by further phase changes, but for representations of half-odd-spin, we cannot, and the sign changes discontinuously as we go round any axis by an angle of 2π. We can, however, construct a representation of the covering group of the Poincare group, called the inhomogeneous SL(2, C); this has elements (a, A), where as before, a is a four-vector, but now A is a complex 2 × 2 matrix with unit determinant. We denote the unitary operators we get by U(a, A), and these give us a continuous, unitary and true representation in that the collection of U(a, A) obey the group law of the inhomogeneous SL(2, C).

Because of the sign change under rotations by 2π, Hermitian operators transforming as spin 1/2, 3/2 etc., cannot be observables. This shows up as the univalence superselection rule: phases between states of spin 0, 1, 2 etc. and those of spin 1/2, 3/2 etc., are not observable. This rule is in addition to the non-observability of the overall phase of a state vector. Concerning the observables, and states |v⟩, we get a representation U(a, L) of Poincaré group on integer spin subspaces, and U(a, A) of the inhomogeneous SL(2, C) on half-odd-integer subspaces, which acts according to the following interpretation:

An ensemble corresponding to U(a, L)|v⟩ is to be interpreted with respect to the coordinates $x' = L^{-1}(x - a)$ in exactly the same way as an ensemble corresponding to |v⟩ is interpreted with respect to the coordinates x; and similarly for the odd subspaces.

The group of spacetime translations is commutative, and so the operators can be simultaneously diagonalised. The generators of these groups give us four self-adjoint operators $P_0, P_j,\ j = 1, 2, 3,$ which transform under the homogeneous group as a four-vector, called the energy–momentum four-vector.

The second part of the zeroth axiom of Wightman is that the representation U(a, A) fulfills the spectral condition—that the simultaneous spectrum of energy–momentum is contained in the forward cone:

$$P_0 \geq 0, \quad P_0^2 - P_j P_j \geq 0.$$

The third part of the axiom is that there is a unique state, represented by a ray in the Hilbert space, which is invariant under the action of the Poincaré group. It is called a vacuum.

=== W1 (assumptions on the domain and continuity of the field) ===
For each test function f, i.e. for a function with a compact support and continuous derivatives of any order, there exists a set of operators $A_1(f),\ldots ,A_n(f)$ which, together with their adjoints, are defined on a dense subset of the Hilbert state space, containing the vacuum. The fields A are operator-valued tempered distributions. The Hilbert state space is spanned by the field polynomials acting on the vacuum (cyclicity condition).

=== W2 (transformation law of the field) ===
The fields are covariant under the action of the Poincaré group and transform according to some representation S of the Lorentz group, or SL(2, C) if the spin is not integer:

$$U(a, L)^\dagger A(x) U(a, L) = S(L) A\big(L^{-1}(x - a)\big).$$

=== W3 (local commutativity or microscopic causality) ===
If the supports of two fields are space-like separated, then the fields either commute or anticommute.

Cyclicity of a vacuum and uniqueness of a vacuum are sometimes considered separately. Also, there is the property of asymptotic completeness — that a Hilbert state space is spanned by the asymptotic spaces $H^\text{in}$ and $H^\text{out}$, appearing in the collision S matrix. The other important property of field theory is mass gap, which is not required by the axioms — that the energy-momentum spectrum has a gap between zero and some positive number.

== Consequences of the axioms ==
From these axioms, certain general theorems follow:

- CPT theorem — there is general symmetry under change of parity, particle–antiparticle reversal and time inversion (none of these symmetries alone exists in nature, as it turns out).
- Connection between spin and statistic — fields that transform according to half integer spin anticommute, while those with integer spin commute (axiom W3). There are actually technical fine details to this theorem. This can be patched up using Klein transformations. See parastatistics and also the ghosts in BRST.
- The impossibility of superluminal communication – if two observers are spacelike separated, then the actions of one observer (including both measurements and changes to the Hamiltonian) do not affect the measurement statistics of the other observer.

Arthur Wightman showed that the vacuum expectation value distributions, satisfying certain set of properties, which follow from the axioms, are sufficient to reconstruct the field theory — Wightman reconstruction theorem, including the existence of a vacuum state; he did not find the condition on the vacuum expectation values guaranteeing the uniqueness of the vacuum; this condition, the cluster property, was found later by Res Jost, Klaus Hepp, David Ruelle and Othmar Steinmann.

If the theory has a mass gap, i.e. there are no masses between 0 and some constant greater than zero, then vacuum expectation distributions are asymptotically independent in distant regions.

Haag's theorem says that there can be no interaction picture — that we cannot use the Fock space of noninteracting particles as a Hilbert space — in the sense that we would identify Hilbert spaces via field polynomials acting on a vacuum at a certain time.

== Relation to other frameworks and concepts in quantum field theory ==
The Wightman framework does not cover infinite-energy states like finite-temperature states.

Unlike local quantum field theory, the Wightman axioms restrict the causal structure of the theory explicitly by imposing either commutativity or anticommutativity between spacelike separated fields, instead of deriving the causal structure as a theorem. If one considers a generalization of the Wightman axioms to dimensions other than 4, this (anti)commutativity postulate rules out anyons and braid statistics in lower dimensions.

The Wightman postulate of a unique vacuum state does not necessarily make the Wightman axioms inappropriate for the case of spontaneous symmetry breaking because we can always restrict ourselves to a superselection sector.

The cyclicity of the vacuum demanded by the Wightman axioms means that they describe only the superselection sector of the vacuum; again, this is not a great loss of generality. However, this assumption does leave out finite-energy states like solitons, which cannot be generated by a polynomial of fields smeared by test functions because a soliton, at least from a field-theoretic perspective, is a global structure involving topological boundary conditions at infinity.

The Wightman framework does not cover effective field theories because there is no limit as to how small the support of a test function can be. I.e., there is no cutoff scale.

The Wightman axioms can be rephrased in terms of a state called a Wightman functional on a Borchers algebra equal to the tensor algebra of a space of test functions.

== Existence of theories that satisfy the axioms ==
One can generalize the Wightman axioms to dimensions other than 4. In dimension 2 and 3, interacting (i.e. non-free) theories that satisfy the axioms have been constructed.

Currently, there is no proof that the Wightman axioms can be satisfied for interacting theories in dimension 4. In particular, the Standard Model of particle physics has no mathematically rigorous foundations. There is a million-dollar prize for a proof that the Wightman axioms can be satisfied for gauge theories, with the additional requirement of a mass gap.

=== Osterwalder–Schrader reconstruction theorem ===
Under certain technical assumptions, it has been shown that a Euclidean QFT can be Wick-rotated into a Wightman QFT, see Osterwalder–Schrader theorem. This theorem is the key tool for the constructions of interacting theories in dimension 2 and 3 that satisfy the Wightman axioms.

== See also ==
- Haag–Kastler axioms
- Hilbert's sixth problem
- Axiomatic quantum field theory
- Local quantum field theory
