= Ray Streater =

British physicist (born 1936)

- Born: Raymond Frederick Streater; 21 April 1936 (age 90); Three Bridges, Worth, Sussex, England
- Citizenship: British
- Occupations: Physicist, professor
- Children: Stephen B. Streater
- Scientific career
- Fields: Quantum field theory, applied mathematics
- Workplaces: King's College London
- Thesis: Quantum Field Theory (1960)
- Doctoral advisor: Abdus Salam; John Clayton Taylor

Raymond Frederick Streater (born 21 April 1936) is a British physicist, and professor emeritus of Applied Mathematics at King's College London. He is best known for co-authoring a text on quantum field theory, the 1964 PCT, Spin and Statistics and All That.

== Life ==
Ray Streater was born on 21 April 1936 in Three Bridges, Worth, Sussex, England. He married Mary Patricia née Palmer in 1962, and they had three children, including Stephen Bernard.

Streater's career may be summarised as follows.

- Jan.-Sep. 1960 – Research Fellow, CERN, Geneva, Switzerland
- 1960-1961 – Instructor in Physics, Princeton University, NJ, USA
- 1961-1964 – Assistant Lecturer in Physics, Imperial College, London
- 1964-1967 – Lecturer in Physics, Imperial College, London
- 1967-1969 – Senior Lecturer in Mathematics, Imperial College, London
- 1969-1984 – Professor of Applied Mathematics, Bedford College, London
- 1984-2001 – Professor of Applied Mathematics, King's College London
- Oct. 2001 on – Emeritus Professor, King's College London

== Works ==
Streater co-authored a classic text on mathematical quantum field theory, reprinted as

PCT, Spin and Statistics and All That (written jointly with Wightman, A. S.), 2000, Princeton University Press, Landmarks in Mathematics and Physics (ISBN 0-691-07062-8 paperback); first published in 1964 by W. A. Benjamin. The title is an homage to 1066 and All That.

He has also become interested in the dynamics of quantum systems that are not in a pure state, but are large. This is expressed in

Statistical Dynamics: A Stochastic Approach to Nonequilibrium Thermodynamics, 1995, Imperial College Press (ISBN 1-86094-002-1 hardback, ISBN 1-86094-004-8 paperback). This work was simplified and extended in the second edition, published in 2009.
