= Borchers algebra =

Tensor algebra arising in functional analysis

In mathematics, a Borchers algebra, Borchers–Uhlmann algebra, or BU-algebra is the tensor algebra of a vector space, often a space of smooth test functions. They were studied by H. J. Borchers (1962), who showed that the Wightman distributions of a quantum field could be interpreted as a state, called a Wightman functional, on a Borchers algebra. A Borchers algebra with a state can often be used to construct an O*-algebra.

The Borchers algebra of a quantum field theory has an ideal called the locality ideal, generated by elements of the form ab−ba for a and b having spacelike-separated support. The Wightman functional of a quantum field theory vanishes on the locality ideal, which is equivalent to the locality axiom for quantum field theory.
