= Konrad Osterwalder =

Swiss mathematician and physicist (1942–2025)

Rector of United Nations University (UNU) Rector Emeritus of ETH Zurich
- In office 1 September 2007 – 28 February 2013
- Preceded by: Hans van Ginkel
- Succeeded by: David M. Malone
- Secretary-General: Ban Ki-moon

Personal details
- Born: 3 June 1942 Frauenfeld, Thurgau, Switzerland
- Died: 19 December 2025 (aged 83) Switzerland
- Education: ETH Zurich
- Known for: Osterwalder–Schrader theorem Jaffe–Lesniewski–Osterwalder cocycle
- Awards: ETH medal (1970); ICM Speaker (1983)

Konrad Osterwalder (3 June 1942 – 19 December 2025) was a Swiss mathematician and physicist, Undersecretary-General of the United Nations, Rector of the United Nations University (UNU), and Rector Emeritus of the Swiss Federal Institute of Technology Zurich (ETH Zurich). He is known for the Osterwalder–Schrader theorem.

== Life and career ==
Konrad Osterwalder was born in Frauenfeld, Thurgau, Switzerland on 3 June 1942. He studied at the Swiss Federal Institute of Technology (Eidgenössische Technische Hochschule; ETH) in Zurich, where he earned a Diploma in theoretical physics in 1965 and a Doctorate in theoretical physics in 1970. He was married to Verena Osterwalder-Bollag, an analytical therapist. They had three children.

After one year with the Courant Institute of Mathematical Sciences, New York University, he accepted a research position at Harvard University with Arthur Jaffe in 1971. He remained on the faculty of Harvard for seven years and was promoted to Assistant Professor for Mathematical Physics in 1973 and Associate Professor for Mathematical Physics in 1976. In 1977, he returned to Switzerland upon being appointed a full Professor for Mathematical Physics at ETH Zurich. His doctoral students include Felix Finster and Emil J. Straube.

During his tenure at ETH Zurich, Osterwalder served as Head of the Department of Mathematics (1986–1990) and Head of the Planning Committee (1990–1995), and was founder of the Centro Stefano Franscini seminar center in Ascona. He was appointed Rector of ETH in 1995 and held that post for 12 years. From November 2006 through August 2007, he also served concurrently as ETH President pro tempore.

On 1 September 2007, Osterwalder joined the United Nations University as its fifth rector. In that role, he held the rank of Under-Secretary-General of the United Nations.

Osterwalder's research focused on the mathematical structure of relativistic quantum field theory as well as on elementary particle physics and statistical mechanics. During his long and distinguished career, he has been a Visiting Fellow/Guest Professor at several prominent universities around the world, including the Institut des Hautes Études Scientifiques (IHES; Bures-sur-Yvette, France); Harvard University; University of Texas (Austin); Max Planck Institute for Physics and Astrophysics (Munich), Università La Sapienza (Rome); Università di Napoli; Waseda University; and Weizmann Institute of Science (Rehovot, Israel).

From 2014, he was a member of International Scientific Council of Tomsk Polytechnic University.

=== United Nations University ===
Osterwalder was appointed to the position of United Nations Under Secretary General and United Nations University Rector by United Nations Secretary-General Ban Ki-moon May 2007 and served until 28 February 2013. He succeeded Prof. Hans van Ginkel from the Netherlands to be the fifth Rector of the United Nations University.

He was credited with turning United Nations University into a world leading institution, ranked #5 & #6 in two categories according to the 2012 Global Go to Think Tank Rankings. He was responsible for ensuring that UNU's charter was amended by the United Nations General Assembly in 2009 allowing the United Nations University to grant degrees, introducing UNU's degree programmes and creating a new concept in education, research and development by introducing the twin institute programmes. A concept that is changing the way that development, aid and capacity building is approached both by developed countries and developing and least developed countries.

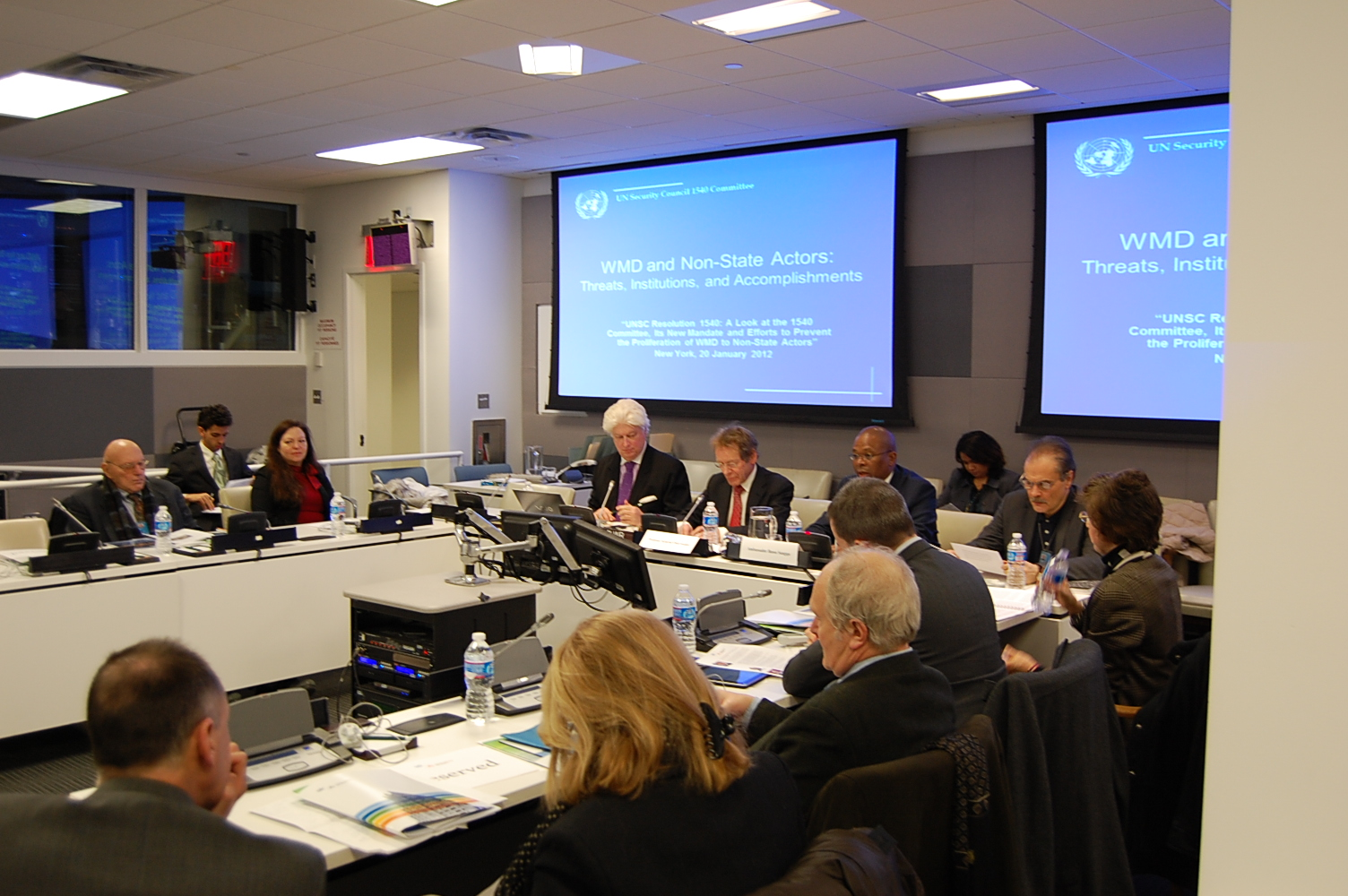
Rector Osterwalder chairing UNU event on the work of the UN SC 1540 committee

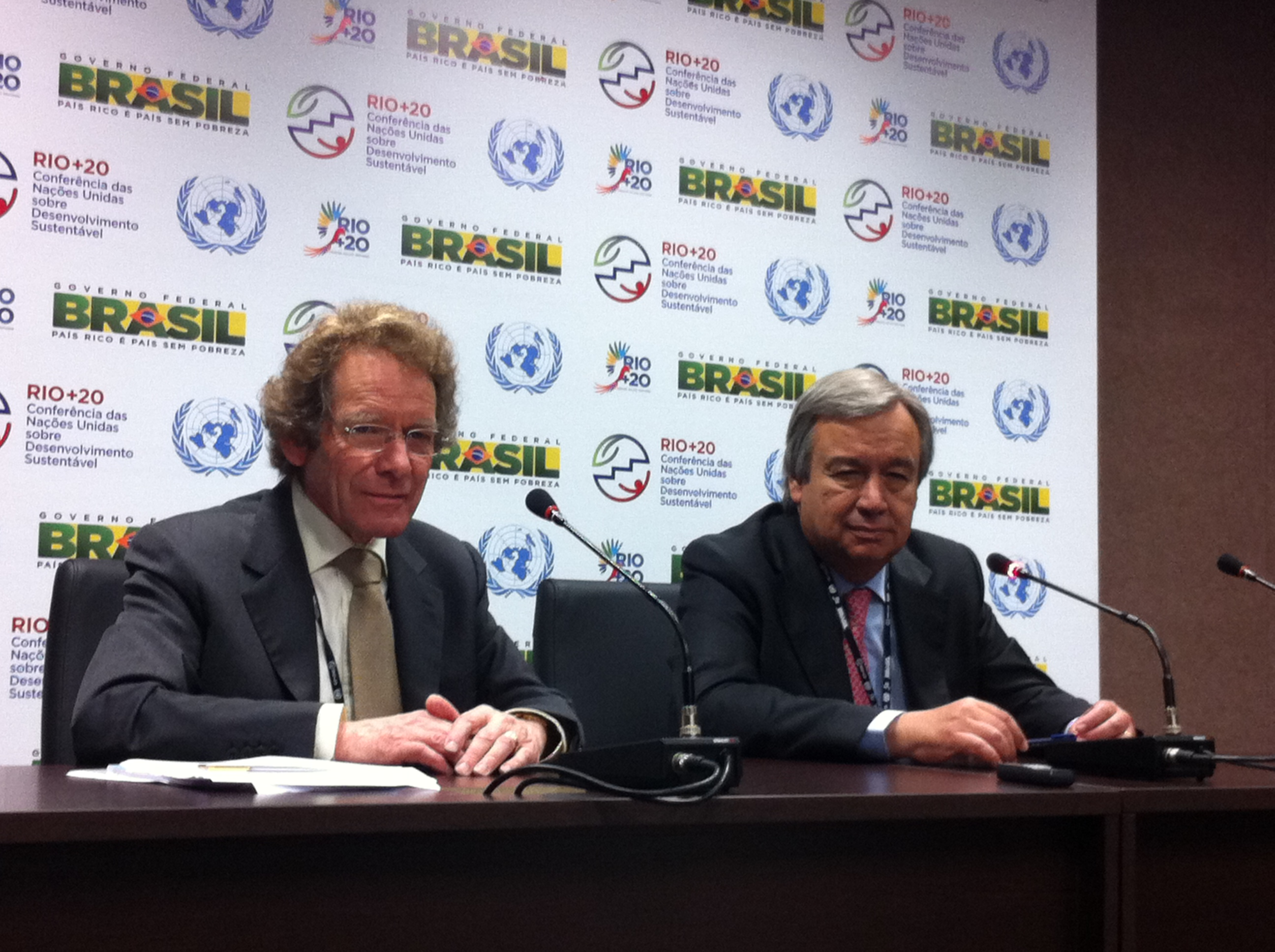
UNU Rector Osterwalder with UNHCR Commissioner Gutteres at Rio+20 Press Conference

=== Bologna Process ===
In March 2000, following the Bologna Declaration by 28 European Education Ministers, the European University Association and the Comite de Liaison within the National Rector's Conference convened the Convention of European Higher Education in Salamanca Spain, hereinafter referred to as the "Salamanca Process" with the aim of discussing the Bologna Declaration and delivering an overall, univocal response to the Council of Ministers. Professor Osterwalder, Rector of ETH, was chosen by the conference as the Rapporteur of the Salamanca Process and the voice of Higher Education institutions. The meeting concluded with a declaration and a report that led to the basis of Higher Education reform within the Bologna process and the EU. In addition, the two conveners of the conference formed the European University Association.

=== Death ===
Osterwalder died on 19 December 2025 at the age of 83.

== Career achievements ==
Osterwalder career encompasses service on many advisory boards, committees and associations including as

- Editor of Communications in Mathematical Physics;
- Treasurer and president of the International Association of Mathematical Physics;
- Member of the visiting committee of the Harvard Department of Physics;
- President of the IHÉS National Committee of the Swiss Academy of Natural Sciences;
- Member of the advisory council of the Euler Institute in St. Petersburg;
- Vice-president of the Conference of Rectors of Swiss Universities;
- President of the Conference of European Schools of Advanced Engineering Education and Research (CESAER);
- Member of the International Academic Advisory Panel of the Government of Singapore;
- President of UNITECH International (a collaboration between several European Technical Universities and more than 20 leading multinational corporations);
- Chairman of the Bologna-Project Group (Swiss Rectors Conference);
- President, Jury of the Brandenberger Foundation;
- Member of the Nucleo di Valutazione (supervisory council) of the Politecnico di Milano;
- Member of the Conseil d'administration of the École Polytechnique de France (Paris);
- Member of the "Comité de l'Enseignement" of the Ecole Nationale Supérieure des Mines de Paris;
- Member of the University Council of the Università della Svizzera Italiana;
- President chair of the University Council of the Technical University Darmstadt;
- Head of the Evaluationsverbund Darmstadt-Kaiserslautern-Karlsruhe;
- Member, Strategic Council, Free University of Berlin;
- Member, Comitato Scientifico Alta Scuola Politecnica (Politecnici di Milano e di Torino);
- Member, Beirat Robert Bosch Stiftung; and
- Member, Academic Council of the International Council on Systems Engineering (INCOSE)
- Member, Consiglio Fondazione Italian Institute of Technology
- Member, The International Selection committee for the Millennium Technology Prize, the world's biggest technology prize (1.5 Million US$), awarded by the Technology Academy Finland
- Executive Committee Member, Club of Rome

== Awards and prizes ==
Osterwalder has been a recipient of many honours and prizes including:

- having one of the top-cited mathematical physics papers of all time
- Fellow of the Alfred P. Sloan Foundation (1974–1978);
- member of the Swiss Academy of Technical Sciences;
- Honorary degree from the Helsinki Technical University
- Honorary Member of Riga Technical University.
- 2009 Matteo Ricci International Award
- 2010 Leonardo da Vinci Medal (SEFI, European Society for Engineering Education)
- 1987 until 1995 awarded by ETH's students the prize of the best teacher of the term
- Fellow of the American Mathematical Society, 2012.
- Grand Cordon of the Order of the Rising Sun (2025)

== Publications ==
- Cluster Properties of the S-Matrix, diploma thesis, unpublished
- Boson Fields with the λ Φ3 Interaction in Two, Three and Four Dimensions, Ph. D. thesis, published by Physikalisches Intitut ETH, Zürich (1970)
- On the Hamiltonian of the Cubic Boson Self-Interaction in Four Dimensional Space Time, Fortschritte der Physik 19, 43–113 (1971)
- On the Spectrum of the Cubic Boson Self-Interaction, ETH Preprint (1971)
- On the Uniqueness of the Hamiltonian and of the Representation of the CCR for the Quartic Boson Interaction in Three Dimensions, Helv. Phys. Acta . 44, 884–909 (1971), with J.-P. Eckmann
- Duality for Free Bose Fields, Comm. Math. Phys. 29, 1–14 (1973)
- On the Uniqueness of the Energy Density in the Infinite Volume Limit for Quantum Field Models, Helv. Phys. Acta. 45, 746–754 (1972), with R. Schrader
- An Application of Tomita's Theory of Modular Hilbert Algebras: Duality for Free Bose Fields, Jour. Funct. Anal. 13, 1–12 (1973), with J.-P. Eckmann
- Feynman-Kac Formula for Euclidean Fermi and Bose Fields, Phys. Rev. Lett. 29, 1423–1425 (1971), with R. Schrader
- Axioms for Euclidean Green's Functions, Comm. Math. Phys. 31, 83–113, (1973), with R. Schrader
- Euclidean Fermi Fields and Feynman-Kac Formula for Boson-Fermion Models, Helv. Phys. Acta. 46, 277–302 (1973), with R. Schrader
- Euclidean Green's Functions and Wightman Distributions, in Constructive Quantum Field Theory, G. Velo and A. Wightman (eds.), 1973 Erice Lectures, Vol. 25, Springer-Verlag, Berlin - Heidelberg - New York (1973); Russian translation, MIR 1977
- Euclidean Fermi Fields, in Constructive Quantum Field Theory, G. Velo and A. Wightman (eds.), 1973 Erice Lectures, Lecture Notes in Physics, Vol 25, Springer Verlag, Berlin-Heidelberg-New York, (1973); Russian translation, MIR 1977
- Axioms for Euclidean Green's Functions, II, Comm. Math. Phys. 42, 281 (1975), with R. Schrader; Russian translation in: Euclidean Quantum Field Theory, MIR 1978
- Is there a Euclidean Field Theory for Fermions, Helv. Phys. Acta. 47, 781 (1974), with J. Fröhlich
- The Wightman Axioms and the Mass Gap for Weakky Coupled (φ4)3 Quantum Field Theories, Ann. of Phys. 97, 80–135 (1976), with J. Feldman
- The Wightman Axioms and the Mass Gap for Weakly Coupled (φ4)3 Quantum Field Theories, Proc. of the International Symposium on Mathematical Problems in Theoretical Physics, Kyoto Japan, 23–29 January 1975. Lecture Notes in Physics, Springer-Verlag, with Joel Feldman
- Recent Results in Constructive Quantum Field Theory (in Japanese), Kagaku, June 1975
- The Construction of λ (φ4)3 Quantum Field Models, in Colloques Internationaux C.N.R.S. No. 248, les méthodes mathématiques de la théorie quantique des champs (1975), with J. Feldman
- A Nontrivial Scattering Matrix for Weakly Coupled P(Φ)2 Models, Helv. Phys. Acta. 49, 525 (1976), with R. Sénéor
- Time Ordered Operator Products and the Scattering Matrix in P(φ)2 Models, in Quantum Dynamics: Models and Mathematics, ed. L. Streit, Springer Verlag Wien, New York 1976
- Gauge Theories on the Lattice, in New Developments in Quantum Theory and Statistical Mechanics, p. 173–200, ed. M. Lévy and P. Mitter (Cargèse 1976), Plenum Press New York, London 1977
- Gauge Field Theories on the Lattice, Ann. Phys. 110, 440–471 (1978), with E. Seiler; reprinted in: Lattice Gauge Theories, ed. Y. Iwasaki and T. Yonega, Series of selected papers in physics, Physical Society of Japan
- Lattice Gauge Theories, in Mathematical Problems in Theoretical Physics, ed. G. Dell'Antonio et al., Springer Lecture Notes in Physics, vol. 80, Springer Verlag 1978
- Auf dem Weg zu einer relativistischen Quantenfeldtheorie, in Einstein Symposion Berlin, Springer Lecture Notes in Physics, vol. 100, Springer Verlag 1979
- Operators, in Encyclopedia of Physics, eds. R.G. Lerner, G.L. Trigg, Addison Wesley (1981)
- Constructive Quantum Field Theories: Scalar Fields, in Gauge Theories, Fundamental Interactions and Rigorous Results, eds. P. Dita, V. Georgescu, R. Purice, Birkhäuser (1982)
- Virtual Representation of Symmetric Spaces and their Analytic Continuation, Ann. of Math., 118, 461 (1983) with J. Fröhlich and E. Seiler
- Constructive Quantum Field Theory: Goals, Methods, Results, Helv. Phys. Acta 59, 220 (1986)
- On the convergence of inverse functions of operators, J.Func. Anal. 81, 320–324, (1988), with A. Jaffe and A. Lesniewski
- Quantum K-Theory: The Chern Character, Commun. Math. Phys. 118, 1–14 (1988), with A. Jaffe and A. Lesniewski
- On super-KMS functionals and entire cyclic cohomology, K-Theory 2, 675–682, (1989), with A. Jaffe and A. Lesniewski
- Ward Identities for non-commutative geometry, Commun. Math. Phys. 132, 118–130, (1990), with A. Jaffe
- Operators, in Encyclopedia of Physics, eds. R.G. Lerner, G.L. Trigg, second edition, VCH Publishers, New York, Cambridge(UK), 1991
- Stability for a class of bilocal Hamiltonians, Commun. Math. Phys. 155, 183–197, (1993), with A. Jaffe and A. Lesniewski
- Supersymmetry and the stability of non-local interactions, in Differential Geometric Methods in Theoretical Physics, H.M.Ho, editor, World Scientific (1993)
- Constructing Supersymmetric Quantum Field Theories, in Advances in Dynamical Systems and Quantum Physics, R. Figari, editor, World Scientific (1994)
- Superspace Formulation of the Chern Character of a Theta Summable Fredholm Module, Commun. Math. Phys. 168, 643 (1995), with A. Lesniewski
- Supersymmetric Quantum Field Theory, in Constructive Results in Field Theory, Statistical Mechanics and Solid State Physics, V. Rivasseau, editor, Springer Verlag 1995
- Unitary Representations of Super Groups, to appear, with A. Lesniewski
- Axioms for Supersymmetric Quantum Field Theories, to appear, with A. Lesniewski
- Mathematical Problems in Theoretical Physics, Springer Lecture Notes in Physics, Vol.116, Springer-Verlag 1980
- Critical Phenomena, Random Systems, Gauge Theories, Parts I/II, Les Houches 1984, Session XLIII, North Holland 1986 (with R. Stora)
- Akademikerproduktionsanlage GmbH? Gedanken zur Positionierung der Hochschulen, NZZ, Bildung und Erziehung, 25 November 1993
- Lehre für die Zukunft, Bulletin der ETHZ, 261, 4–7, 1996
- The Renaissance Engineer in face of Unexpected Vulnerabilities, 30th SEFI Annual conference, Firenze 2002
- Worldwide Trends and their Impacts, The 3rd Technology Trends Seminar Sept. 2008
- Was erwartet die Wirtschaft von der Hochschulwelt, ZEIT Konferenz Hochschule und Bildung, Juli 1009
- L'Università delle Nazioni Unite per il dialogo tra le culture, Milano, Università cattolica, Cerimonia per il premio Matteo Ricci
