= Axiomatic quantum field theory =

Topic in mathematical physics

Axiomatic quantum field theory is a mathematical discipline which aims to describe quantum field theory in terms of rigorous axioms. It is strongly associated with functional analysis and operator algebras, but has also been studied in recent years from a more geometric and functorial perspective.

There are two main challenges in this discipline. First, one must propose a set of axioms which describe the general properties of any mathematical object that deserves to be called a "quantum field theory". Then, one gives rigorous mathematical constructions of examples satisfying these axioms.

== Analytic approaches ==
=== Wightman axioms ===
The first set of axioms for quantum field theories, known as the Wightman axioms, were proposed by Arthur Wightman in the early 1950s. These axioms attempt to describe QFTs on flat Minkowski spacetime by regarding quantum fields as operator-valued distributions acting on a Hilbert space. In practice, one often uses the Wightman reconstruction theorem, which guarantees that the operator-valued distributions and the Hilbert space can be recovered from the collection of correlation functions.

=== Osterwalder–Schrader axioms ===
The correlation functions of a QFT satisfying the Wightman axioms often can be analytically continued from Lorentz signature to Euclidean signature. (Crudely, one replaces the time variable $\;t\;$ with imaginary time $\;\tau = -\sqrt{-1\,}\,t~;$ the factors of $\;\sqrt{-1\,}\;$ change the sign of the time-time components of the metric tensor.) The resulting functions are called Schwinger functions. For the Schwinger functions there is a list of conditions — analyticity, permutation symmetry, Euclidean covariance, and reflection positivity — which a set of functions defined on various powers of Euclidean space-time must satisfy in order to be the analytic continuation of the set of correlation functions of a QFT satisfying the Wightman axioms.

=== Haag–Kastler axioms ===
The Haag–Kastler axioms axiomatize QFT in terms of nets of algebras.

=== Euclidean CFT axioms ===
These axioms (see e.g.) are used in the conformal bootstrap approach to conformal field theory in $\mathbb{R}^d$. They are also referred to as Euclidean bootstrap axioms.

== See also ==
- Dirac–von Neumann axioms
