= Jean-Benoît Bost =

French mathematician (born 1961)

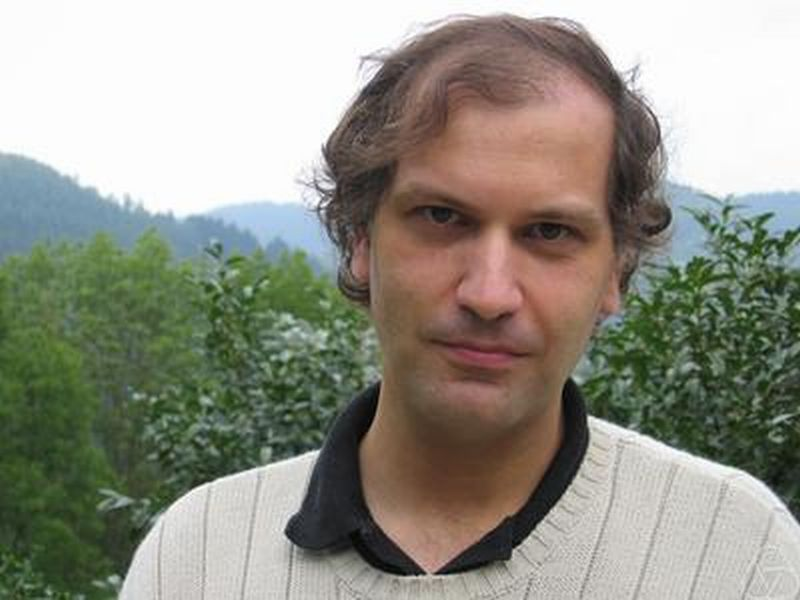
Jean-Benoit Bost, Oberwolfach 2005

Jean-Benoît Bost (born 27 July 1961, in Neuilly-sur-Seine) is a French mathematician.

== Early life and education ==
In 1977, Bost graduated from the Lycée Louis-le-Grand and finished first in the Concours général, a national competition. Bost studied from 1979 to 1983 (qualifying in 1981 for the agrégation des mathématiques) at the École Normale Supérieure (ENS), where he was from 1984 to 1988 agrégé-préparateur (teacher) and worked under the direction of Alain Connes.

== Career ==
From 1988, Bost was chargé de recherches and from 1993 directeur de recherches at the Centre national de la recherche scientifique (CNRS). From 1993 to 2006, he was maître de conferences at the École polytechnique. He has been a professor at l'Université Paris-Saclay (Paris XI) in Orsay since 1998.

== Research ==
Bost deals with noncommutative geometry (partly in collaboration with Alain Connes) with applications to quantum field theory, algebraic geometry, and arithmetic geometry. The eponymous Bost conjecture is a variant of the Baum–Connes conjecture.

His work with François Charles on Archimedean overflow generalizes the arithmetic holonomicity theorem of Calegari-Dimitrov-Tang. It also establishes an arithmetic counterpart of theorems of Lefschetz and Nori on fundamental groups of complex surfaces.

== Awards and honors ==
In 1990, he received the Prix Peccot-Vimont of the Collège de France. In 2002, he received the Prix Élie Cartan of the Académie des sciences. In 1986 he was an invited speaker at the International Congress on Mathematical Physics in Marseille. In 2006, he was an invited speaker with talk Evaluation maps, slopes, and algebraicity criteria at the International Congress of Mathematicians in Madrid.

From 2005 to 2015, Bost was a senior member of the Institut Universitaire de France. He was elected in 2012 a Fellow of the American Mathematical Society and in 2016 a member of Academia Europaea.

== See also ==
- Arakelov theory
- Bost conjecture
- Bost–Connes system
- Baum–Connes conjecture

== Selected publications ==
- As editor with François Loeser and Michel Raynaud: Courbes semi-stables et groupe fondamental en géométrie algébrique (Luminy, December 1998), Birkhäuser 2000
- Introduction to compact Riemann Surfaces, Jacobean and Abelian Varieties. In: Michel Waldschmidt, Claude Itzykson, Jean-Marc Luck, Pierre Moussa (eds.): Number Theory and Physics. Les Houches 1989, Springer 1992
