= Weak trace-class operator =

Mathematical concept

In mathematics, a weak trace class operator is a compact operator on a separable Hilbert space H with singular values the same order as the harmonic sequence. When the dimension of H is infinite, the ideal of weak trace-class operators is strictly larger than the ideal of trace class operators, and has fundamentally different properties. The usual operator trace on the trace-class operators does not extend to the weak trace class. Instead the ideal of weak trace-class operators admits an infinite number of linearly independent quasi-continuous traces, and it is the smallest two-sided ideal for which all traces on it are singular traces.

Weak trace-class operators feature in the noncommutative geometry of French mathematician Alain Connes.

== Definition ==
A compact operator A on an infinite dimensional separable Hilbert space H is weak trace class if μ(n,A) = O(n^{−1}), where μ(A) is the sequence of singular values. In mathematical notation the two-sided ideal of all weak trace-class operators is denoted,

$$L_{1,\infty} = \{ A \in K(H) : \mu(n,A) = O(n^{-1}) \}.$$

where $K(H)$ are the compact operators. The term weak trace-class, or weak-L_{1}, is used because the operator ideal corresponds, in J. W. Calkin's correspondence between two-sided ideals of bounded linear operators and rearrangement invariant sequence spaces, to the weak-l_{1} sequence space.

== Properties ==
- the weak trace-class operators admit a quasi-norm defined by

$$\| A \|_{w} = \sup_{n \geq 0} (1+n)\mu(n,A),$$

making L_{1,∞} a quasi-Banach operator ideal, that is an ideal that is also a quasi-Banach space.

== See also ==
- Lp space
- Spectral triple
- Singular trace
- Dixmier trace
