= Singular trace =

Noncommutative geometric structure

In mathematics, a singular trace is a trace on a space of linear operators of a separable Hilbert space that vanishes on operators of finite rank. Singular traces are a feature of infinite-dimensional Hilbert spaces such as the space of square-summable sequences and spaces of square-integrable functions. Linear operators on a finite-dimensional Hilbert space have only the zero functional as a singular trace since all operators have finite rank. For example, matrix algebras have no non-trivial singular traces and the matrix trace is the unique trace up to scaling.

American mathematician Gary Weiss and, later, British mathematician Nigel Kalton observed in the infinite-dimensional case that there are non-trivial singular traces on the ideal of trace class operators. Therefore, in distinction to the finite-dimensional case, in infinite dimensions the canonical operator trace is not the unique trace up to scaling. The operator trace is the continuous extension of the matrix trace from finite rank operators to all trace class operators, and the term singular derives from the fact that a singular trace vanishes where the matrix trace is supported, analogous to a singular measure vanishing where Lebesgue measure is supported.

Singular traces measure the asymptotic spectral behaviour of operators and have found applications in the noncommutative geometry of French mathematician Alain Connes. In heuristic terms, a singular trace corresponds to a way of summing numbers a_{1}, a_{2}, a_{3}, ... that is completely orthogonal or 'singular' with respect to the usual sum a_{1} + a_{2} + a_{3} + ... . This allows mathematicians to sum sequences like the harmonic sequence (and operators with similar spectral behaviour) that are divergent for the usual sum. In similar terms a (noncommutative) measure theory or probability theory can be built for distributions like the Cauchy distribution (and operators with similar spectral behaviour) that do not have finite expectation in the usual sense.

== Origin ==
By 1950 French mathematician Jacques Dixmier, a founder of the semifinite theory of von Neumann algebras, thought that a trace on the bounded operators of a separable Hilbert space would automatically be normal up to some trivial counterexamples. Over the course of 15 years Dixmier, aided by a suggestion of Nachman Aronszajn and inequalities proved by Joseph Hersch, developed an example of a non-trivial yet non-normal trace on weak trace-class operators, disproving his earlier view. Singular traces based on Dixmier's construction are called Dixmier traces.

Independently and by different methods, German mathematician Albrecht Pietsch (de) investigated traces on ideals of operators on Banach spaces. In 1987 Nigel Kalton answered a question of Pietsch by showing that the operator trace is not the unique trace on quasi-normed proper subideals of the trace-class operators on a Hilbert space. József Varga independently studied a similar question. To solve the question of uniqueness of the trace on the full ideal of trace-class operators, Kalton developed a spectral condition for the commutator subspace of trace class operators following on from results of Gary Weiss. A consequence of the results of Weiss and the spectral condition of Kalton was the existence of non-trivial singular traces on trace class operators.

Also independently, and from a different direction, Mariusz Wodzicki investigated the noncommutative residue, a trace on classical pseudo-differential operators on a compact manifold that vanishes on trace class pseudo-differential operators of order less than the negative of the dimension of the manifold.

== Definition ==
A trace φ on a two-sided ideal J of the bounded linear operators B(H) on a separable Hilbert space H is a linear functional φ:J → $\mathbb{C}$ such that φ(AB) = φ(BA) for all operators A from J and B from B(H). That is, a trace is a linear functional on J that vanishes on the commutator subspace Com(J) of J.

A trace φ is singular if φ(A) = 0 for every A from the subideal of finite rank operators F(H) within J.

== Existence and characterisation ==
Singular traces are characterised by the spectral Calkin correspondence between two-sided ideals of bounded operators on Hilbert space and rearrangement invariant sequence spaces. Using the spectral characterisation of the commutator subspace due to Ken Dykema, Tadeusz Figiel, Gary Weiss and Mariusz Wodzicki, to every trace φ on a two-sided ideal J there is a unique symmetric functional f on the corresponding Calkin sequence space j such that

$\varphi(A) = {\rm f}(\mu(A))$	1

for every positive operator A belonging to J. Here μ: J_{+} → j_{+} is the map from a positive operator to its singular values. A singular trace φ corresponds to a symmetric functional f on the sequence space j that vanishes on c_{00}, the sequences with a finite number of non-zero terms.

The characterisation parallels the construction of the usual operator trace where

$${\rm Tr}(A) = \sum_{n=0}^\infty \mu(n,A) = \sum \mu(A)$$

for A a positive trace class operator. The trace class operators and the sequence space of summable sequences are in Calkin correspondence. (The sum Σ is a symmetric functional on the space of summable sequences.)

=== Existence ===
A non-zero trace φ exists on a two-sided ideal J of operators on a separable Hilbert space if the co-dimension of its commutator subspace is not zero. There are ideals that admit infinitely many linearly independent non-zero singular traces. For example, the commutator subspace of the ideal of weak trace-class operators contains the ideal of trace class operators and every positive operator in the commutator subspace of the weak trace class is trace class. Consequently, every trace on the weak trace class ideal is singular and the co-dimension of the weak trace class ideal commutator subspace is infinite. Not all of the singular traces on the weak trace class ideal are Dixmier traces.

=== Lidskii formulation ===
The trace of a square matrix is the sum of its eigenvalues. Lidskii's formula extends this result to functional analysis and states that the trace of a trace class operator A is given by the sum of its eigenvalues,

$${\rm Tr}(A) = \sum_{n=0}^\infty \lambda(n,A) = \sum ( \lambda(A) ).$$

The characterisation (1) of a trace φ on positive operators of a two-ideal J as a symmetric functional applied to singular values can be improved to the statement that the trace φ on any operator in J is given by the same symmetric functional applied to eigenvalue sequences, provided that the eigenvalues of all operators in J belong to the Calkin sequence space j. In particular, if a bounded operator A belongs to J whenever there is a bounded operator B in J such that

$\prod_{k=0}^n \mu(k,A) \leq \prod_{k=0}^n \mu(k,B)$	2

for every natural number n, then for each trace φ on J there is a unique symmetric functional f on the Calkin space j with

$\varphi(A) = {\rm f}(\lambda(A))$	3

where λ(A) is the sequence of eigenvalues of an operator A in J rearranged so that the absolute value of the eigenvalues is decreasing. If A is quasi-nilpotent then λ(A) is the zero sequence. Most two-sided ideals satisfy the property (2), including all Banach ideals and quasi-Banach ideals.

Equation (3) is the precise statement that singular traces measure asymptotic spectral behaviour of operators.

=== Fredholm formulation ===
The trace of a square matrix is the sum of its diagonal elements. In functional analysis the corresponding formula for trace class operators is

$${\rm Tr}(A) = \sum_{n=0}^\infty \langle A e_n , e_n \rangle = \sum (\{ \langle A e_n , e_n \rangle \}_{n=0}^\infty )$$

where { e_{n} }_{n=0}^{∞} is an arbitrary orthonormal basis of the separable Hilbert space H. Singular traces do not have an equivalent formulation for arbitrary bases. Only when φ(A)=0 will an operator A generally satisfy

$$\varphi(A) = {\rm f} (\{ \langle A e_n , e_n \rangle \}_{n=0}^\infty )$$

for a singular trace φ and an arbitrary orthonormal basis { e_{n} }_{n=0}^{∞} .

The diagonal formulation is often used instead of the Lidskii formulation to calculate the trace of products, since eigenvalues of products are hard to determine. For example, in quantum statistical mechanics the expectation of an observable S is calculated against a fixed trace-class energy density operator T by the formula

$$\langle S \rangle = {\rm Tr} (ST) = \sum_{n=0}^\infty \langle S e_n , e_n \rangle \lambda(n,T) = v_T(\{ \langle S e_n , e_n \rangle \}_{n=0}^\infty )$$

where v_{T} belongs to (l_{∞})_{*} ≅ l_{1}. The expectation is calculated from the expectation values ⟨Se_{n}, e_{n}⟩ and the probability ⟨P_{n}⟩ = λ(n,T) of the system being in the bound quantum state e_{n}. Here P_{n} is the projection operator onto the one-dimensional subspace spanned by the energy eigenstate e_{n}. The eigenvalues of the product, λ(n,ST), have no equivalent interpretation.

There are results for singular traces of products. For a product ST where S is bounded and T is selfadjoint and belongs to a two-sided ideal J then

$$\varphi(ST) = {\rm f}( \{ \langle S e_n , e_n \rangle \lambda(n,T) \}_{n=0}^\infty)
= v_{\varphi,T}( \{ \langle S e_n , e_n \rangle \}_{n=0}^\infty )$$

for any trace φ on J. The orthonormal basis { e_{n} }_{n=0}^{∞} must be ordered so that Te_{n} = μ(n,T)e_{n}, n=0,1,2... . When φ is singular and φ(T)=1 then v_{φ,T} is a linear functional on l_{∞} that extends the limit at infinity on the convergent sequences c. The expectation ⟨S⟩ = φ(ST) in this case has the property that ⟨P_{n}⟩= 0 for each n, or that there is no probability of being in a bound quantum state. That

$$\langle S \rangle = \text{``limit at infinity''} \langle S e_n , e_n \rangle$$

has led to a link between singular traces, the correspondence principle, and classical limits,.

== Use in noncommutative geometry ==
The first application of singular traces was the noncommutative residue, a trace on classical pseudo-differential operators on a compact manifold that vanishes on trace class pseudo-differential operators of order less than the negative of the dimension of the manifold, introduced Mariusz Wodzicki and Victor Guillemin independently . Alain Connes characterised the noncommutative residue within noncommutative geometry, Connes' generalisation of differential geometry, using Dixmier traces.

An expectation involving a singular trace and non-trace class density is used in noncommutative geometry,

$\int S = {\rm Tr}_\omega( S |D|^{-d} ).$	4

Here S is a bounded linear operator on the Hilbert space L_{2}(X) of square-integrable functions on a d-dimensional closed manifold X, Tr_{ω} is a Dixmier trace on the weak trace class ideal, and the density |D|^{−d} in the weak trace class ideal is the dth power of the 'line element' |D|^{−1} where D is a Dirac type operator suitably normalised so that Tr_{ω}(|D|^{−d})=1.

The expectation (4) is an extension of the Lebesgue integral on the commutative algebra of essentially bounded functions acting by multiplication on L_{2}(X) to the full noncommutative algebra of bounded operators on L_{2}(X). That is,

$$\int M_f = \int_X f(x) \, dx .$$

where dx is the volume form on X, f is an essentially bounded function, and M_{f} is the bounded operator M_{f} h(x) = (fh)(x) for any square-integrable function h in L_{2}(X). Simultaneously, the expectation (4) is the limit at infinity of the quantum expectations S → ⟨Se_{n},e_{n}⟩ defined by the eigenvectors of the Laplacian on X. More precisely, for many bounded operators on L_{2}(X), included all zero-order classical pseudo-differential operators and operators of the form M_{f} where f is an essentially bounded function, the sequence ⟨Se_{n}, e_{n}⟩ logarithmically converges and

$$\int S = \lim_{n \to \infty} \frac{\sum_{k=0}^n \frac{1}{1+k} \langle S e_k , e_k \rangle}{\sum_{k=0}^n \frac{1}{1+k}}$$

These properties are linked to the spectrum of Dirac type operators and not to Dixmier traces; they still hold if the Dixmier trace in (4) is replaced by any trace on weak trace class operators.

== Dixmier trace ==
The Dixmier trace is a single trace introduced by Jacques Dixmier (1966). It is a non-normal trace on a space of linear operators on a Hilbert space larger than the space of trace class operators.

Some applications of Dixmier traces to noncommutative geometry are described in (Connes 1994).

=== Definition ===
If H is a Hilbert space, then L^{1,∞}(H) is the space of compact linear operators T on H such that the norm

$$\|T\|_{1,\infty} = \sup_N\frac{\sum_{i=1}^N \mu_i(T)}{\log(N)}$$

is finite, where the numbers μ_{i}(T) are the eigenvalues of |T| arranged in decreasing order. Let

$$a_N = \frac{\sum_{i=1}^N \mu_i(T)}{\log(N)}$$.

The Dixmier trace Tr_{ω}(T) of T is defined for positive operators T of L^{1,∞}(H) to be

$$\operatorname{Tr}_\omega(T)= \lim_\omega a_N$$

where lim_{ω} is a scale-invariant positive "extension" of the usual limit, to all bounded sequences. In other words, it has the following properties:

- lim_{ω}(α_{n}) ≥ 0 if all α_{n} ≥ 0 (positivity)
- lim_{ω}(α_{n}) = lim(α_{n}) whenever the ordinary limit exists
- lim_{ω}(α_{1}, α_{1}, α_{2}, α_{2}, α_{3}, ...) = lim_{ω}(α_{n}) (scale invariance)

There are many such extensions (such as a Banach limit of α_{1}, α_{2}, α_{4}, α_{8},...) so there are many different Dixmier traces. As the Dixmier trace is linear, it extends by linearity to all operators of L^{1,∞}(H). If the Dixmier trace of an operator is independent of the choice of lim_{ω} then the operator is called measurable.

=== Properties ===
- Tr_{ω}(T) is linear in T.
- If T ≥ 0 then Tr_{ω}(T) ≥ 0
- If S is bounded then Tr_{ω}(ST) = Tr_{ω}(TS)
- Tr_{ω}(T) does not depend on the choice of inner product on H.
- Tr_{ω}(T) = 0 for all trace class operators T, but there are compact operators for which it is equal to 1.

A trace φ is called normal if φ(sup x_{α}) = sup φ( x_{α}) for every bounded increasing directed family of positive operators. Any normal trace on $L^{1,\infty}(H)$ is equal to the usual trace, so the Dixmier trace is an example of a non-normal trace.

=== Dixmier trace examples ===
A compact self-adjoint operator with eigenvalues 1, 1/2, 1/3, ... has Dixmier trace equal to 1.

If the eigenvalues μ_{i} of the positive operator T have the property that

$$\zeta_T(s)= \operatorname{Tr}(T^s)= \sum{\mu_i^s}$$

converges for Re(s)>1 and extends to a meromorphic function near s=1 with at most a simple pole at s=1, then the Dixmier trace of T is the residue at s=1 (and in particular is independent of the choice of ω).

Connes (1988) showed that Wodzicki's noncommutative residue (Wodzicki 1984) of a pseudodifferential operator on a manifold M of order -dim(M) is equal to its Dixmier trace.

== Examples ==
Suppose H is a separable infinite-dimensional Hilbert space.

=== Ideals without traces ===
- Bounded operators. Paul Halmos showed in 1954 that every bounded operator on a separable infinite-dimensional Hilbert space is the sum of two commutators. That is, Com(B(H)) = B(H) and the co-dimension of the commutator subspace of B(H) is zero. The bounded linear operators admit no everywhere defined traces. The qualification is relevant; as a von Neumann algebra B(H) admits semifinite (strong-densely defined) traces.

Modern examination of the commutator subspace involves checking its spectral characterisation. The following ideals have no traces since the Cesàro means of positive sequences from the Calkin corresponding sequence space belong back in the sequence space, indicating that the ideal and its commutator subspace are equal.

- Compact operators. The commutator subspace Com(K(H)) = K(H) where K(H) denotes the compact linear operators. The ideal of compact operators admits no traces.
- Schatten p-ideals. The commutator subspace Com(L_{p}) = L_{p}, p > 1, where L_{p} denotes the Schatten p-ideal,

$$L_{p} = \{ A \in K(H) : \left( \sum_{n=0}^\infty \mu(n,A)^p \right)^{\frac{1}{p}} < \infty \},$$

and μ(A) denotes the sequence of singular values of a compact operator A. The Schatten ideals for p > 1 admit no traces.

- Lorentz p-ideals or weak-L_{p} ideals. The commutator subspace Com(L_{p,∞}) = L_{p,∞}, p > 1, where

$$L_{p,\infty} = \{ A \in K(H) : \mu(n,A) = O(n^{-\frac{1}{p}}) \}$$

is the weak-L_{p} ideal. The weak-L_{p} ideals, p > 1, admit no traces. The weak-L_{p} ideals are equal to the Lorentz ideals (below) with concave function ψ(n)=n^{1−1/p}.

=== Ideals with traces ===
- Finite rank operators. It is checked from the spectral condition that the kernel of the operator trace Tr and the commutator subspace of the finite rank operators are equal, ker Tr = Com(F(H)). It follows that the commutator subspace Com(F(H)) has co-dimension 1 in F(H). Up to scaling Tr is the unique trace on F(H).
- Trace class operators. The trace class operators L_{1} have Com(L_{1}) strictly contained in ker Tr. The co-dimension of the commutator subspace is therefore greater than one, and is shown to be infinite. Whilst Tr is, up to scaling, the unique continuous trace on L_{1} for the norm ||A||_{1} = Tr(|A|), the ideal of trace class operators admits infinitely many linearly independent and non-trivial singular traces.
- Weak trace class operators. Since Com(L_{1,∞})_{+} = (L_{1})_{+} the co-dimension of the commutator subspace of the weak-L_{1} ideal is infinite. Every trace on weak trace class operators vanishes on trace class operators, and hence is singular. The weak trace class operators form the smallest ideal where every trace on the ideal must be singular. Dixmier traces provide an explicit construction of traces on the weak trace class operators.

$${\rm Tr}_\omega(A) = \omega \left( \left\{ \frac{1}{\log(1+n)} \sum_{k=0}^n \lambda(k,A) \right\}_{n=0}^\infty \right), \quad A \in L_{1,\infty} .$$

This formula is valid for every weak trace class operator A and involves the eigenvalues ordered in decreasing absolute value. Also ω can be any extension to l_{∞} of the ordinary limit, it does not need to be dilation invariant as in Dixmier's original formulation. Not all of the singular traces on the weak trace class ideal are Dixmier traces.

- k-tensor weak trace class ideals. The weak-L_{p} ideals, p > 1, admit no traces as explained above. They are not the right setting for higher order factorisations of the traces on the weak trace class ideal L_{1,∞}. For a natural number k ≥ 1 the ideals

$$E_{\otimes k} = \{ A \in K(H) :
\mu(n,A) = O (\log^{k-1}(n)/n ) \}$$

form the appropriate setting. They have commutator subspaces of infinite co-dimension that form a chain such that E_{⊗k-1} ⊂ Com(E_{⊗k}) (with the convention that E_{0} = L_{1}). Dixmier traces on E_{⊗k} have the form

$${\rm Tr}^k_\omega(A) = \omega \left( \left\{ \frac{1}{\log^k(1+n)} \sum_{j=0}^n \lambda(j,A) \right\}_{n=0}^\infty \right), \quad A \in E_{\otimes k} .$$

- Lorentz ψ-ideals. The natural setting for Dixmier traces is on a Lorentz ψ-ideal for a concave increasing function ψ : [0,∞) → [0,∞),

$$L_{\psi} = \{ A \in K(H) : \frac{1}{\psi(1+n)} \sum_{j=0}^n \mu(n,A) < \infty \}.$$

There are some ω that extend the ordinary limit to l_{∞} such that

$${\rm Tr}^\psi_\omega(A) = \omega \left( \left\{ \frac{1}{\psi(1+n)} \sum_{j=0}^n \lambda(j,A) \right\}_{n=0}^\infty \right), \quad A \in L_{\psi}$$

is a singular trace if and only if

$$\liminf_{n \to \infty} \frac{\psi(2n)}{\psi(n)} = 1 .$$

The principal ideal generated by any compact operator A with μ(A)=ψ' is called the 'small ideal' inside L_{ψ}. The k-tensor weak trace class ideal is the small ideal inside the Lorentz ideal with ψ=log^{k}.

- Fully symmetric ideals generalise Lorentz ideals. Dixmier traces form all the fully symmetric traces on a Lorentz ideal up to scaling, and form a weak* dense subset of the fully symmetric traces on a general fully symmetric ideal. It is known the fully symmetric traces are a strict subset of the positive traces on a fully symmetric ideal. Therefore, Dixmier traces are not the full set of positive traces on Lorentz ideals.
