= Éric Leichtnam =

French mathematician

Éric Leichtnam is director of research at the CNRS at the Institut de Mathématiques de Jussieu in Paris. His fields of interest are noncommutative geometry, ergodic theory, Dirichlet problem, non-commutative residue.

== Selected publications ==
- Katz, Mikhail G.; Leichtnam, Eric (2013), "Commuting and noncommuting infinitesimals", American Mathematical Monthly, 120 (7): 631–641, arXiv:1304.0583, doi:10.4169/amer.math.monthly.120.07.631
- Gérard, Patrick; Leichtnam, Éric: Ergodic properties of eigenfunctions for the Dirichlet problem. Duke Math. J. 71 (1993), no. 2, 559–607.
- Fedosov, Boris V.; Golse, François; Leichtnam, Eric; Schrohe, Elmar: The noncommutative residue for ----- (1996), no. 1, 1–31.
- Leichtnam, E.; Piazza, P.: Spectral sections and higher Atiyah–Patodi–Singer index theory on Galois coverings. Geometric and Functional Analysis 8 (1998), no. 1, 17–58.
- Leichtnam, Eric (2005), "An invitation to Deninger's work on arithmetic zeta functions", Geometry, spectral theory, groups, and dynamics, Contemp. Math., vol. 387, Providence, RI: Amer. Math. Soc., pp. 201–236, MR 2180209.
