= Spectral triple =

In noncommutative geometry and related branches of mathematics and mathematical physics, a spectral triple is a set of data which encodes a geometric phenomenon in an analytic way. The definition typically involves a Hilbert space, an algebra of operators on it and an unbounded self-adjoint operator, endowed with supplemental structures. It was conceived by Alain Connes who was motivated by the Atiyah-Singer index theorem and sought its extension to 'noncommutative' spaces. Some authors refer to this notion as unbounded K-cycles or as unbounded Fredholm modules.

== Motivation ==
A motivating example of spectral triple is given by the algebra of smooth functions on a compact spin manifold, acting on the Hilbert space of L^{2}-spinors, accompanied by the Dirac operator associated to the spin structure. From the knowledge of these objects one is able to recover the original manifold as a metric space: the manifold as a topological space is recovered as the spectrum of the algebra, while the (absolute value of) Dirac operator retains the metric. On the other hand, the phase part of the Dirac operator, in conjunction with the algebra of functions, gives a K-cycle which encodes index-theoretic information. The local index formula expresses the pairing of the K-group of the manifold with this K-cycle in two ways: the 'analytic/global' side involves the usual trace on the Hilbert space and commutators of functions with the phase operator (which corresponds to the 'index' part of the index theorem), while the 'geometric/local' side involves the Dixmier trace and commutators with the Dirac operator (which corresponds to the 'characteristic class integration' part of the index theorem).

Extensions of the index theorem can be considered in cases, typically when one has an action of a group on the manifold, or when the manifold is endowed with a foliation structure, among others. In those cases the algebraic system of the 'functions' which expresses the underlying geometric object is no longer commutative, but one may be able to find the space of square integrable spinors (or, sections of a Clifford module) on which the algebra acts, and the corresponding 'Dirac' operator on it satisfying certain boundedness of commutators implied by the pseudo-differential calculus.

== Definition ==
An odd spectral triple is a triple (A, H, D) consisting of a Hilbert space H, an algebra A of operators on H (usually closed under taking adjoints) and a densely defined self adjoint operator D satisfying ‖[a, D]‖ < ∞ for any a ∈ A. An even spectral triple is an odd spectral triple with a Z/2Z-grading on H, such that the elements in A are even while D is odd with respect to this grading. One could also say that an even spectral triple is given by a quartet (A, H, D, γ) such that γ is a self adjoint unitary on H satisfying a γ = γ a for any a in A and D γ = - γ D.

A finitely summable spectral triple is a spectral triple (A, H, D) such that a.D for any a in A has a compact resolvent which belongs to the class of L^{p+}-operators for a fixed p (when A contains the identity operator on H, it is enough to require D^{−1} in L^{p+}(H)). When this condition is satisfied, the triple (A, H, D) is said to be p-summable. A spectral triple is said to be θ-summable when e^{−tD^{2}} is of trace class for any t > 0.

Let δ(T) denote the commutator of |D| with an operator T on H. A spectral triple is said to be regular when the elements in A and the operators of the form [a, D] for a in A are in the domain of the iterates δ^{n} of δ.

When a spectral triple (A, H, D) is p-summable, one may define its zeta function ζ_{D}(s) = Tr(|D|^{−s}); more generally there are zeta functions ζ_{b}(s) = Tr(b|D|^{−s}) for each element b in the algebra B generated by δ^{n}(A) and δ^{n}([a, D]) for positive integers n. They are related to the heat kernel exp(-t|D|) by a Mellin transform. The collection of the poles of the analytic continuation of ζ_{b} for b in B is called the dimension spectrum of (A, H, D).

A real spectral triple is a spectral triple (A, H, D) accompanied with an anti-linear involution J on H, satisfying [a, JbJ] = 0 for a, b in A. In the even case it is usually assumed that J is even with respect to the grading on H.

== Important concepts ==
Given a spectral triple (A, H, D), one can apply several important operations to it. The most fundamental one is the polar decomposition D = F|D| of D into a self adjoint unitary operator F (the 'phase' of D) and a densely defined positive operator |D| (the 'metric' part).

=== Connes' Metric on the state space ===
If $(A,H,D)$ is a spectral triple, and $\mathfrak{A}$ is the closure of $A$ for the operator norm, then Connes introduces an extended pseudo-metric on the state space $S(\mathfrak{A})$ of $\mathfrak{A}$, by setting, for any two states $\varphi,\psi \in S(A)$:

$d(\varphi,\psi) = \sup\{ |\varphi(a) - \psi(a)| : a \in A, \|[D,a]\| \leq 1 \} .$

In general, the Connes metric can indeed take the value $\infty$, and it may be zero between different states. Connes originally observed, for $X$ a connected, compact, spin Riemannian manifold, that the restriction of this pseudo-metric to the pure states, i.e. the characters of the C*-algebra $C(X)$, whose space is naturally homeomorphic (when endowed with the weak* topology) to $X$, recovers the path metric for a Riemannian metric over $X$ induced by the Riemannian metric, when the spectral triple is $(C^\infty(X),\Gamma,D)$, where $C^\infty(X)$ is the algebra of smooth functions over the manifold $X$, and D is the closure of the usual Dirac operator acting on a dense subspace of the Hilbert space $\Gamma$ of square integrable sections of the spinor bundle over $X$.

Moreover, Connes observed that this distance is bounded if, and only if, there exists a state $\mu \in S(\mathfrak{A})$ such that the set: $\{ a \in A : \|[D,a]\| \leq 1, \mu(a) = 0 \}$ is bounded.

This construction is reminiscent of the construction by Kantorovich of a distance on the space of Radon probability measures over a compact metric space, as introduced by Kantorovich during his study of Monge's transportation problem. Indeed, in that case, if $(X,d)$ is a compact metric space, and if $\mu,\nu$ are two such probability measures, then Kantorovich's distance between $\mu,\nu$, as was observed by Kantorovich and Rubinstein, can be defined by

$k(\mu,\nu) = \sup\{ |\int_X f d\mu - \int_X f d\nu| : f \in C(X), \mathrm{Lip}(f) \leq 1 \},$ where $C(X)$ is the C*-algebra of complex valued continuous functions over $X$, and for any function $f \in C(X)$, we denote by $\mathrm{Lip}(f)$ its Lipschitz seminorm: $\mathrm{Lip}(f) = \sup\{ \frac{|f(x)-f(y)|}{d(x,y)} : x,y \in X, x\not= y \}.$

This analogy is more than formal: in the case described above, where $X$ is a connected compact spin Riemannian manifold, and $d$ is the associated path metric on $X$, then $\|[D,f]\|\leq 1$ if, and only if, $\mathrm{Lip}(f)\leq 1$.

Guided by this observation, it is natural to wonder what properties Connes' metric shares with Kantorovich's distance. In general, the topology induced by Connes' distance may not be Hausdorff, or give a finite diameter to the state space of the $\mathfrak{A}$, whereas Kantorovich's metric always induces the weak* topology on the space of Radon probability measures over $X$ --- which is weak* compact.

Rieffel worked out a necessary and sufficient condition on spectral triples (and more generally, on seminorms which play a role of analogue for Lipschitz seminorms) for Connes' distance to indeed induce the weak* topology on the state space of $\mathfrak{A}$, namely: Connes' metric induced by a spectral triple $(A,H,D)$ topologizes the weak* topology on the state space $S(\mathfrak{A})$ if, and only if, there exists a state $\mu \in S(\mathfrak{A})$ such that the set $\left\{ a \in A : \|[D,a]\| \leq 1, \mu(a) = 0 \right\}$ is totally bounded.

These observations are the foundations of the study of noncommutative metric geometry, which deals with the geometry of the space of quantum metric spaces, many of which being constructed using spectral triples whose Connes' metric induces the weak* topology on the underlying state space. In this context, an analogue of the Gromov-Hausdorff distance has been constructed on the space of metric spectral triples, allowing the discussion of the geometry of this space, and the construction of approximations of spectral triples by "simpler" (more regular, or finite dimensional) spectral triples.

=== Pairing with K-theory ===
The self adjoint unitary F gives a map of the K-theory of A into integers by taking Fredholm index as follows. In the even case, each projection e in A decomposes as e_{0} ⊕ e_{1} under the grading and e_{1}Fe_{0} becomes a Fredholm operator from e_{0}H to e_{1}H. Thus e → Ind e_{1}Fe_{0} defines an additive mapping of K_{0}(A) to Z. In the odd case the eigenspace decomposition of F gives a grading on H, and each invertible element in A gives a Fredholm operator (F + 1) u (F − 1)/4 from (F − 1)H to (F + 1)H. Thus u → Ind (F + 1) u (F − 1)/4 gives an additive mapping from K_{1}(A) to Z.

When the spectral triple is finitely summable, one may write the above indexes using the (super) trace, and a product of F, e (resp. u) and commutator of F with e (resp. u). This can be encoded as a (p + 1)-functional on A satisfying some algebraic conditions and give Hochschild / cyclic cohomology cocycles, which describe the above maps from K-theory to the integers.

== See also ==
- JLO cocycle
