= Skandalis =

Skandalis (Greek: Σκανδάλης) is a Greek surname. Notable people with the surname include:

- Georges Skandalis (born 1955), Greek and French mathematician
- John Skandalis (born 1976), Australian rugby league player
