= John Calkin =

John Calkin may refer to:

- John Baptiste Calkin, English composer, organist and music teacher
- John Williams Calkin, American mathematician
