= Paul Baum =

Paul Baum may refer to:

- Paul Baum (artist) (1859–1932), German landscape painter
- Paul Baum (mathematician) (born 1936), American mathematician
