= Noncommutative torus =

In mathematics, and more specifically in the theory of C*-algebras, the noncommutative tori A_{θ}, also known as irrational rotation algebras for irrational values of θ, form a family of noncommutative C*-algebras which generalize the algebra of continuous functions on the 2-torus. Many topological and geometric properties of the classical 2-torus have algebraic analogues for the noncommutative tori, and as such they are fundamental examples of a noncommutative space in the sense of Alain Connes.

== Definition ==
For any irrational real number θ, the noncommutative torus $A_\theta$ is the C*-subalgebra of $B(L^2(\mathbb{R}/\mathbb{Z}))$, the algebra of bounded linear operators on square-integrable functions on the unit circle $S^1 \subset \mathbb{C}$, generated by two unitary operators $U, V$ defined as

$$\begin{align}
U(f)(z) &= z f(z) \\
V(f)(z) &= f(ze^{-2\pi i \theta}).
\end{align}$$

A quick calculation shows that VU = e^{−2π i θ}UV.

== Alternative characterizations ==
- Universal property: A_{θ} can be defined (up to isomorphism) as the universal C*-algebra generated by two unitary elements U and V satisfying the relation VU = e^{2π i θ}UV. This definition extends to the case when θ is rational. In particular when θ = 0, A_{θ} is isomorphic to continuous functions on the 2-torus by the Gelfand transform.
- Irrational rotation algebra: Let the infinite cyclic group Z act on the circle S^{1} by the rotation action by angle 2πiθ. This induces an action of Z by automorphisms on the algebra of continuous functions C(S^{1}). The resulting C*-crossed product C(S^{1}) ⋊ Z is isomorphic to A_{θ}. The generating unitaries are the generator of the group Z and the identity function on the circle z : S^{1} → C.
- Twisted group algebra: The function σ : Z^{2} × Z^{2} → C; σ((m,n), (p,q)) = e^{2πinpθ} is a group 2-cocycle on Z^{2}, and the corresponding twisted group algebra C*(Z^{2}; σ) is isomorphic to A_{θ}.

== Properties ==
- Every irrational rotation algebra A_{θ} is simple, that is, it does not contain any proper closed two-sided ideals other than $\{0\}$ and itself.
- Every irrational rotation algebra has a unique tracial state.
- The irrational rotation algebras are nuclear.

== Classification and K-theory ==
The K-theory of A_{θ} is Z^{2} in both even dimension and odd dimension, and so does not distinguish the irrational rotation algebras. But as an ordered group, K_{0} ≃ Z + θZ. Therefore, two noncommutative tori A_{θ} and A_{η} are isomorphic if and only if either θ + η or θ − η is an integer.

Two irrational rotation algebras A_{θ} and A_{η} are strongly Morita equivalent if and only if θ and η are in the same orbit of the action of SL(2, Z) on R by linear fractional transformations. In particular, the noncommutative tori with θ rational are Morita equivalent to the classical torus. On the other hand, the noncommutative tori with θ irrational are simple C*-algebras.
