= Deformation quantization =

In mathematics and physics, deformation quantization roughly amounts to finding a (quantum) algebra whose classical limit is a given (classical) algebra such as a Lie algebra or a Poisson algebra.

== In physics ==
Intuitively, a deformation of a mathematical object is a family of the same kind of objects that depend on some parameter(s). Here, it provides rules for how to deform the "classical" commutative algebra of observables to a quantum non-commutative algebra of observables.

The basic setup in deformation theory is to start with an algebraic structure (say a Lie algebra) and ask: Does there exist a one or more parameter(s) family of similar structures, such that for an initial value of the parameter(s) one has the same structure (Lie algebra) one started with? (The oldest illustration of this may be the realization of Eratosthenes in the ancient world that a flat Earth was deformable to a spherical Earth, with deformation parameter 1/R_{⊕}.) E.g., one may define a noncommutative torus as a deformation quantization through a ★-product to implicitly address all convergence subtleties (usually not addressed in formal deformation quantization). Insofar as the algebra of functions on a space determines the geometry of that space, the study of the star product leads to the study of a non-commutative geometry deformation of that space.

In the context of the above flat phase-space example, the star product (Moyal product, actually introduced by Groenewold in 1946), ★_{ħ}, of a pair of functions in f_{1}, f_{2} ∈ C^{∞}(ℜ^{2}), is specified by

$$\Phi [f_1 \star f_2] = \Phi [f_1]\Phi [f_2].\,$$

where $\Phi$ is the Wigner–Weyl transform.

The star product is not commutative in general, but goes over to the ordinary commutative product of functions in the limit of ħ → 0. As such, it is said to define a deformation of the commutative algebra of C^{∞}(ℜ^{2}).

For the Weyl-map example above, the ★-product may be written in terms of the Poisson bracket as

$$f_1 \star f_2 = \sum_{n=0}^\infty \frac {1}{n!} \left(\frac{i\hbar}{2} \right)^n  \Pi^n(f_1, f_2).$$

Here, Π is the Poisson bivector, an operator defined such that its powers are

$$\Pi^0(f_1,f_2)=f_1f_2$$

and

$$\Pi^1(f_1,f_2)=\{f_1,f_2\}=
\frac{\partial f_1}{\partial q}
\frac{\partial f_2}{\partial p} -
\frac{\partial f_1}{\partial p}
\frac{\partial f_2}{\partial q} ~,$$

where {f_{1}, f_{2}} is the Poisson bracket. More generally,

$$\Pi^n(f_1,f_2)=  \sum_{k=0}^n (-1)^k {n \choose k}
\left(
\frac{\partial^k }{\partial p^k}
\frac{\partial^{n-k}}{\partial q^{n-k}} f_1
\right) \times \left(
\frac{\partial^{n-k} }{\partial p^{n-k}}
\frac{\partial^k}{\partial q^k} f_2
\right)$$

where ${n \choose k}$ is the binomial coefficient.

Thus, e.g., Gaussians compose hyperbolically,

$$\exp \left (-{a } (q^2+p^2)\right ) ~ \star ~
\exp \left (-{b} (q^2+p^2)\right ) = {1\over 1+\hbar^2 ab}
\exp \left (-{a+b\over 1+\hbar^2 ab} (q^2+p^2)\right ) ,$$

or

$$\delta (q) ~ \star ~ \delta(p) = {2\over h}
\exp \left (2i{qp\over\hbar}\right ) ,$$

etc. These formulas are predicated on coordinates in which the Poisson bivector is constant (plain flat Poisson brackets). For the general formula on arbitrary Poisson manifolds, cf. the Kontsevich quantization formula.

Antisymmetrization of this ★-product yields the Moyal bracket, the proper quantum deformation of the Poisson bracket, and the phase-space isomorph (Wigner transform) of the quantum commutator in the more usual Hilbert-space formulation of quantum mechanics. As such, it provides the cornerstone of the dynamical equations of observables in this phase-space formulation.

There results a complete phase space formulation of quantum mechanics, completely equivalent to the Hilbert-space operator representation, with star-multiplications paralleling operator multiplications isomorphically.

Expectation values in phase-space quantization are obtained isomorphically to tracing operator observables Φ with the density matrix in Hilbert space: they are obtained by phase-space integrals of observables such as the above f with the Wigner quasi-probability distribution effectively serving as a measure.

Thus, by expressing quantum mechanics in phase space (the same ambit as for classical mechanics), the above Weyl map facilitates recognition of quantum mechanics as a deformation (generalization, cf. correspondence principle) of classical mechanics, with deformation parameter ħ/S. (Other familiar deformations in physics involve the deformation of classical Newtonian into relativistic mechanics, with deformation parameter v/c; or the deformation of Newtonian gravity into General Relativity, with deformation parameter Schwarzschild-radius/characteristic-dimension. Conversely, group contraction leads to the vanishing-parameter undeformed theories—classical limits.)

Classical expressions, observables, and operations (such as Poisson brackets) are modified by ħ-dependent quantum corrections, as the conventional commutative multiplication applying in classical mechanics is generalized to the noncommutative star-multiplication characterizing quantum mechanics and underlying its uncertainty principle.

== See also ==
- Deligne's conjecture on Hochschild cohomology
- Poisson manifold
- Formality theorem; for now, see https://mathoverflow.net/questions/32889/a-few-questions-about-kontsevich-formality
- Kontsevich quantization formula
