= Quasi-free algebra =

Associative algebra with lifting property

In abstract algebra, a quasi-free algebra is an associative algebra that satisfies the lifting property similar to that of a formally smooth algebra in commutative algebra. The notion was introduced by Cuntz and Quillen for the applications to cyclic homology. A quasi-free algebra generalizes a free algebra, as well as the coordinate ring of a smooth affine complex curve. Because of the latter generalization, a quasi-free algebra can be thought of as signifying smoothness on a noncommutative space.

== Definition ==
Let A be an associative algebra over the complex numbers. Then A is said to be quasi-free if the following equivalent conditions are met:

- Given a square-zero extension $R \to R/I$, each homomorphism $A \to R/I$ lifts to $A \to R$.
- The cohomological dimension of A with respect to Hochschild cohomology is at most one.

Let $(\Omega A, d)$ denotes the differential envelope of A; i.e., the universal differential-graded algebra generated by A. Then A is quasi-free if and only if $\Omega^1 A$ is projective as a bimodule over A.

There is also a characterization in terms of a connection. Given an A-bimodule E, a right connection on E is a linear map

$$\nabla_r : E \to E \otimes_A \Omega^1 A$$

that satisfies $\nabla_r(as) = a \nabla_r(s)$ and $\nabla_r(sa) = \nabla_r(s) a + s \otimes da$. A left connection is defined in the similar way. Then A is quasi-free if and only if $\Omega^1 A$ admits a right connection.

== Properties and examples ==
One of basic properties of a quasi-free algebra is that the algebra is left and right hereditary (i.e., a submodule of a projective left or right module is projective or equivalently the left or right global dimension is at most one). This puts a strong restriction for algebras to be quasi-free. For example, a hereditary (commutative) integral domain is precisely a Dedekind domain. In particular, a polynomial ring over a field is quasi-free if and only if the number of variables is at most one.

An analog of the tubular neighborhood theorem, called the formal tubular neighborhood theorem, holds for quasi-free algebras.
