= Unification of theories in physics =

Idea of connecting all of physics into one set of equations

Unification of theories about observable fundamental phenomena of nature is one of the primary goals of physics. Isaac Newton’s unification of terrestrial and celestial mechanics into one theory of gravity in the 17th century and James Clerk Maxwell’s unification of electricity with magnetism into electromagnetism in the 19th were the first two unifications. In the 20th century the focus shifted to the unification of fundamental interactions (also called forces), beginning with the unification of electromagnetic forces with the weak force to create electroweak interaction. This process of "unifying" forces continues today, with the ultimate goal of finding a theory of everything.

== Past instances ==
=== Unification of gravity on Earth with astronomical behaviors ===
The "first great unification" was Isaac Newton's 17th century unification of gravity, in which he brought together the understandings of the observable phenomena of gravity on Earth with the observable laws of behaviour of celestial bodies in space, formulating a fundamentally new, universal mathematical framework that applied to every particle in the universe. This new law accounted for both terrestrial and celestial mechanics, superseding the local, approximate laws of Galileo Galilei and Johannes Kepler with a single, abstract principle that governed the entire cosmos.

Newton's unification is considered a foundational step in the quest for a unified theory of physics. Physicist Steven Weinberg stated that "It is with Isaac Newton that the modern dream of a final theory really begins".

=== Unification of magnetism, electricity, light and related radiation ===
The ancient Chinese people observed that certain rocks such as lodestone and magnetite were attracted to one another by an invisible force. This effect was later called magnetism, which was first rigorously studied in the 17th century. However, prior to ancient Chinese observations of magnetism, the ancient Greeks knew of other objects such as amber, that when rubbed with fur would cause a similar invisible attraction between the two. This was also studied rigorously in the 17th century and came to be called electricity. Thus, physics had come to understand two observations of nature in terms of some root cause (electricity and magnetism). However, work in the 19th century revealed that these two forces were just two different aspects of one force – electromagnetism.

The "second great unification" was James Clerk Maxwell's 19th century unification of electromagnetism. It brought together the understandings of the observable phenomena of magnetism, electricity and light (and more broadly, the spectrum of electromagnetic radiation).

This was followed in the 20th century by Albert Einstein's unification of the description of space and time into an inseparable continuum, and of mass and energy through his theory of special relativity.

=== Alignment of quantum mechanics with special relativity ===
Later, Paul Dirac developed quantum field theory, placing quantum mechanics within the framework of special relativity.

=== Unification of electromagnetic and weak interactions ===
A relatively recent unification of electromagnetism and the weak interaction was developed by Sheldon Glashow, Abdus Salam, and Steven Weinberg, leading to what is now known as the electroweak interaction. This theory made significant predictions, including the existence of the W and Z bosons, which were subsequently confirmed experimentally.

== Prospective instances ==
=== Quantum gravity ===
Attempts to unify quantum mechanics and general relativity into a single theory of quantum gravity, a program ongoing for over half a century, have not yet been decisively resolved; current leading candidates are M-theory, superstring theory and loop quantum gravity.

=== Unification of the remaining fundamental interactions ===
Attempts to "unify" the known fundamental interactions continues today, with the goal of finding a theory of everything, which remains perhaps the most prominent of the unsolved problems in physics. There remain four fundamental forces which have not been decisively unified: the gravitational and electromagnetic interactions, which produce significant long-range forces whose effects can be seen directly in everyday life, and the strong and weak interactions, which produce forces at subatomic distances and govern nuclear interactions. Electromagnetism and the weak interactions are widely considered to be two aspects of the electroweak interaction.

== See also ==
- Grand Unified Theory
- Unifying theories in mathematics
- Unity of science
