= JLO cocycle =

Cocycle in an entire cyclic cohomology group

In noncommutative geometry, the Jaffe–Lesniewski–Osterwalder (JLO) cocycle (named after Arthur Jaffe, Andrzej Lesniewski, and Konrad Osterwalder) is a cocycle in an entire cyclic cohomology group. It is a non-commutative version of the classic Chern character of the conventional differential geometry. In noncommutative geometry, the concept of a manifold is replaced by a noncommutative algebra $\mathcal{A}$ of "functions" on the putative noncommutative space. The cyclic cohomology of the algebra $\mathcal{A}$ contains the information about the topology of that noncommutative space, very much as the de Rham cohomology contains the information about the topology of a conventional manifold.

The JLO cocycle is associated with a metric structure of non-commutative differential geometry known as a $\theta$-summable spectral triple (also known as a $\theta$-summable Fredholm module). It was first introduced in a 1988 paper by Jaffe, Lesniewski, and Osterwalder.

== $\theta$-summable spectral triples ==
The input to the JLO construction is a $\theta$-summable spectral triple. These triples consists of the following data:

(a) A Hilbert space $\mathcal{H}$ such that $\mathcal{A}$ acts on it as an algebra of bounded operators.

(b) A $\mathbb{Z}_2$-grading $\gamma$ on $\mathcal{H}$, $\mathcal{H}=\mathcal{H}_0\oplus\mathcal{H}_1$. We assume that the algebra $\mathcal{A}$ is even under the $\mathbb{Z}_2$-grading, i.e. $a\gamma=\gamma a$, for all $a\in\mathcal{A}$.

(c) A self-adjoint (unbounded) operator $D$, called the Dirac operator such that

(i) $D$ is odd under $\gamma$, i.e. $D\gamma=-\gamma D$.

(ii) Each $a\in\mathcal{A}$ maps the domain of $D$, $\mathrm{Dom}\left(D\right)$ into itself, and the operator $\left[D,a\right]:\mathrm{Dom}\left(D\right)\to\mathcal{H}$ is bounded.

(iii) $\mathrm{tr}\left(e^{-tD^2}\right)<\infty$, for all $t>0$.

A classic example of a $\theta$-summable spectral triple arises as follows. Let $M$ be a compact spin manifold, $\mathcal{A}=C^\infty\left(M\right)$, the algebra of smooth functions on $M$, $\mathcal{H}$ the Hilbert space of square integrable forms on $M$, and $D$ the standard Dirac operator.

== The cocycle ==
Given a $\theta$-summable spectral triple, the JLO cocycle $\Phi_t\left(D\right)$ associated to the triple is a sequence

$$\Phi_t\left(D\right)=\left(\Phi_t^0\left(D\right),\Phi_t^2\left(D\right),\Phi_t^4\left(D\right),\ldots\right)$$

of functionals on the algebra $\mathcal{A}$, where

$$\Phi_t^0\left(D\right)\left(a_0\right)=\mathrm{tr}\left(\gamma a_0 e^{-tD^2}\right),$$
$$\Phi_t^n\left(D\right)\left(a_0,a_1,\ldots,a_n\right)=\int_{0\leq s_1\leq\ldots s_n\leq t}\mathrm{tr}\left(\gamma a_0 e^{-s_1 D^2}\left[D,a_1\right]e^{-\left(s_2-s_1\right)D^2}\ldots\left[D,a_n\right]e^{-\left(t-s_n\right)D^2}\right)ds_1\ldots ds_n,$$

for $n=2,4,\dots$. The cohomology class defined by $\Phi_t\left(D\right)$ is independent of the value of $t$

== See also ==
- Cyclic homology
- Chern class
- Arthur Jaffe
