= Georges Skandalis =

Greek and French mathematician (born 1955)

Georges Skandalis (Greek: Γεώργιος Σκανδάλης; born 5 November 1955, in Athens) is a Greek and French mathematician, known for his work on noncommutative geometry and operator algebras.

After following secondary education and classes préparatoires scientifiques in the parisian Lycée Louis-le-Grand, Skandalis studied from 1975 at 1979 at l'École Normale Supérieure de la rue d'Ulm with agrégation in 1977. From 1979 he was an assistant at the University of Paris VI, where under Alain Connes in 1986 he earned his doctorate (doctorat d´État). From 1980 to 1988 he was attaché de recherches and then chargé de recherches at CNRS and as of 1988 Professor at the University of Paris VII (in the Institut de Mathématiques de Jussieu).

He works on operator algebras, K-theory of operator algebras, groupoids, locally compact quantum groups and singular foliations.

In 2002 with Nigel Higson and Vincent Lafforgue, Skandalis published counterexamples to a generalization of the Baum–Connes conjecture (i.e. Baum-Connes conjecture with coefficients) in various special cases, based on work by Mikhail Gromov.

In 1990 Skandalis was an invited speaker at the International Congress of Mathematicians in Kyoto (Operator Algebras and Duality). He was a member of Bourbaki.

== Selected works ==
- with Joachim Cuntz, Boris Tsygan: Cyclic homology in non-commutative geometry (= Encyclopaedia of Mathematical Sciences. Operator Algebras and Non-Commutative Geometry. vol. 121). Springer, Berlin et al. 2004, ISBN 3-540-40469-4 (pp. 115–134: Skandalis: Noncommutative Geometry, the Transverse Signature Operator, and Hopf Algebras (after A. Connes and H. Moscovici). Translated by Raphaël Ponge and Nick Wright. doi:10.1007/978-3-662-06444-3_3).
- with Gennadi Kasparov: Groups acting properly on "bolic" spaces and the Novikov conjecture. In: Annals of Mathematics. vol. 158, no. 1, 2003, pp. 165–206, doi:10.4007/annals.2003.158.165.
- with Jean Louis Tu and Guoliang Yu: The coarse Baum-Connes conjecture and groupoids. In: Topology. vol. 41, no. 4, 2002, ISSN 0040-9383, pp. 807–834, doi:10.1016/S0040-9383(01)00004-0.
