= Paul Baum (mathematician) =

American mathematician

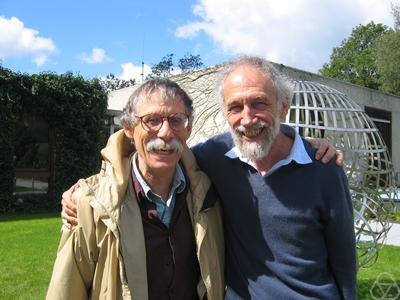
Paul Baum (left) and Alain Connes (2004)

Paul Frank Baum (born 1936) is an American mathematician, the Evan Pugh Professor of Mathematics at Pennsylvania State University. He is known for formulating the Baum–Connes conjecture with Alain Connes in the early 1980s.

Baum studied at Harvard University, earning a bachelor's degree summa cum laude in 1958. He went on to Princeton University for his graduate studies, completing his Ph.D. in 1963 under the supervision of John Coleman Moore and Norman Steenrod. He was several times a visiting scholar at the Institute for Advanced Study (1964–65, 1976–77, 2004) After several visiting positions and an assistant professorship at Princeton, he moved to Brown University in 1967, and remained there until 1987 when he moved to Penn State. He became a distinguished professor in 1991 and was given his named chair in 1996.

In 2007, a meeting in honor of his 70th birthday was held in Warsaw by the Polish Academy of Sciences. In 2011, the University of Colorado gave him an honorary doctorate. In 2012 he became a fellow of the American Mathematical Society.
