= John Williams Calkin =

American mathematician

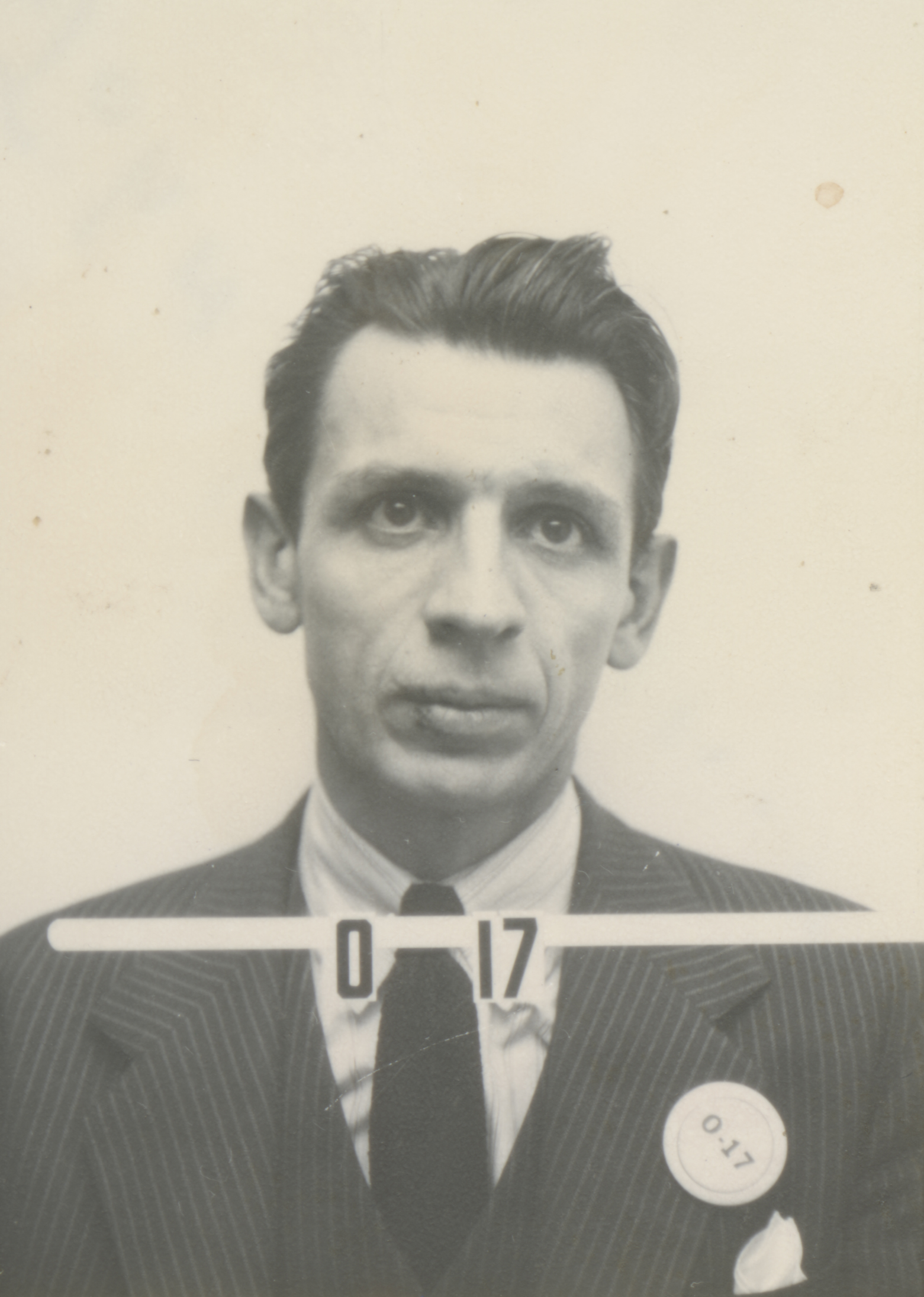
Photo from Calkin's identification badge at Los Alamos.

John Williams Calkin (11 October 1909, New Rochelle, New York – 5 August 1964, Westhampton, New York) was an American mathematician, specializing in functional analysis. The Calkin algebra is named after him.

== Biography ==
Calkin received his bachelor's degree from Columbia University in 1933 and his master's degree in 1934 and his Ph.D. in 1937 from Harvard University. His doctoral dissertation Applications of the Theory of Hilbert Space to Partial Differential Equations; the Self-Adjoint Transformations in Hilbert Space Associated with a Formal Partial Differential Operator of the Second Order and Elliptic Type ) was supervised by Marshall H. Stone. In the dissertation, Calkin acknowledges useful discussions with John von Neumann. At the Institute for Advanced Study, Calkin was a research assistant for the academic year 1937–1938 (working with Oswald Veblen and von Neumann) and in the first eight months of 1942. From 1938 to 1942 he was an assistant professor at the University of New Hampshire and then at Chicago's Illinois Institute of Technology. During the late 1930s and early 1940s he wrote several important papers on operator theory and its applications to partial differential equations.

During World War II Calkin was part of a mine warfare operations analysis group with J.L. Doob, J. von Neumann, and M.H. Stone. Von Neumann and Calkin worked on shock waves and damage by explosives; they were sent to England to learn of the progress under way there. When it appeared that their special knowledge would be useful for the Manhattan Project, they moved to Los Alamos.

From Los Alamos, Calkin went in 1946 as a Guggenheim Fellow to the California Institute of Technology. He later taught at the Rice Institute (renamed Rice University in 1960), before returning in 1949 to Los Alamos Scientific Laboratory as a member of the theoretical division. There he worked on the development of the H-bomb.

In 1958, he accepted a consulting appointment at New York University and at Brookhaven National Laboratory and, in 1961, was named head, and then chairman of the Applied Mathematics Department.

Upon his death he was survived by his widow, Emilienne Calkin (1922–2000), and his son, Brant Calkin (born 1934), from a previous marriage (to Eileen Calkin). Brant Calkin is an environmental activist in New Mexico and Utah and a former president of the Sierra Club.

== Selected publications ==
- Calkin, J. W. (1938). "Abstract Self-Adjoint Boundary Conditions". Proceedings of the National Academy of Sciences of the United States of America. 24 (1): 38–42. Bibcode:1938PNAS...24...38C. doi:10.1073/pnas.24.1.38. PMC 1077021. PMID 16588184.
- Calkin, J. W. (1939). "General Self-Adjoint Boundary Conditions for Certain Partial Differential Operators". Proceedings of the National Academy of Sciences of the United States of America. 25 (4): 201–206. Bibcode:1939PNAS...25..201C. doi:10.1073/pnas.25.4.201. PMC 1077745. PMID 16588287.
- Calkin, J. W. (1939). "Abstract symmetric boundary conditions". Transactions of the American Mathematical Society. 45 (3): 369–442. doi:10.1090/S0002-9947-1939-1501997-7. ISSN 0002-9947.
- Calkin, J. W. (1940). "Abstract Definite Boundary Value Problems". Proceedings of the National Academy of Sciences of the United States of America. 26 (12): 708–712. Bibcode:1940PNAS...26..708C. doi:10.1073/pnas.26.12.708. PMC 1078257. PMID 16588415.
- Calkin, J. W. (1940). "Functions of several variables and absolute continuity, I". Duke Mathematical Journal. 6: 170–186. doi:10.1215/S0012-7094-40-00614-7.
- Calkin, J. W. (1940). "Symmetric transformations in Hilbert space". Duke Mathematical Journal. 7: 504–508. doi:10.1215/S0012-7094-40-00730-X.
- Calkin, J. W. (21 March 1945). "The similarity solution for a convergent shock wave near zero radius, Report LA-242". lanl.gov.
- Calkin, J. W. (16 April 1945). "Effect of variable entropy in the theory of spherically convergent detonation waves, Report LA-262" (PDF). lanl.gov.
- Calkin, J. W. (30 September 1952). Mixing of frictionless, incompressible substances, I, Report LA-1472 (PDF). Los Alamos Scientific Laboratory of the University of California.
- Calkin, J. W. (1963). "A mathematician looks at bubble and spark chamber data processing" (PDF). CERN Document Server (cds.cern.ch).

== See also ==
- Calkin correspondence
