= Noncommutative residue =

Mathematical concept

In mathematics, noncommutative residue, defined independently by M. Wodzicki (1984) and Guillemin (1985), is a certain trace on the algebra of pseudodifferential operators on a compact differentiable manifold that is expressed via a local density. In the case of the circle, the noncommutative residue had been studied earlier by M. Adler (1978) and Y. Manin (1978) in the context of one-dimensional integrable systems.

== See also ==
- Dixmier trace
