= Calkin correspondence =

In mathematics, the Calkin correspondence, named after mathematician John Williams Calkin, is a bijective correspondence between two-sided ideals of bounded linear operators of a separable infinite-dimensional Hilbert space and Calkin sequence spaces (also called rearrangement invariant sequence spaces). The correspondence is implemented by mapping an operator to its singular value sequence.

It originated from John von Neumann's study of symmetric norms on matrix algebras. It provides a fundamental classification and tool for the study of two-sided ideals of compact operators and their traces, by reducing problems about operator spaces to (more resolvable) problems on sequence spaces.

== Definitions ==
A two-sided ideal J of the bounded linear operators B(H) on a separable Hilbert space H is a linear subspace such that AB and BA belong to J for all operators A from J and B from B(H).

A sequence space j within l_{∞} can be embedded in B(H) using an arbitrary orthonormal basis {e_{n} }_{n=0}^{∞}. Associate to a sequence a from j the bounded operator

$${\rm diag}(a) = \sum_{n=0}^\infty a_n | e_n \rangle \langle e_n |,$$

where bra–ket notation has been used for the one-dimensional projections onto the subspaces spanned by individual basis vectors. The sequence of absolute values of the entries of a in decreasing order is called the decreasing rearrangement of a. The decreasing rearrangement can be denoted μ(n,a), n = 0, 1, 2, ... Note that it is identical to the singular values of the operator diag(a). Another notation for the decreasing rearrangement is a*.

A Calkin (or rearrangement invariant) sequence space is a linear subspace j of the bounded sequences l_{∞} such that if a is a bounded sequence and μ(n,a) ≤ μ(n,b), n = 0, 1, 2, ..., for some b in j, then a belongs to j.

== Correspondence ==
Associate to a two-sided ideal J the sequence space j given by

$$j = \{ a \in l_\infty : {\rm diag}(\mu(a)) \in J \} .$$

Associate to a sequence space j the two-sided ideal J given by

$$J = \{ A \in B(H) : \mu(A) \in j \} .$$

Here μ(A) and μ(a) are the singular values of the operators A and diag(a), respectively. Calkin's Theorem states that the two maps are inverse to each other. We obtain,

Calkin correspondence: The two-sided ideals of bounded operators on an infinite dimensional separable Hilbert space and the Calkin sequence spaces are in bijective correspondence.

It is sufficient to know the association only between positive operators and positive sequences, hence the map μ: J_{+} → j_{+} from a positive operator to its singular values implements the Calkin correspondence.

Another way of interpreting the Calkin correspondence, since the sequence space j is equivalent as a Banach space to the operators in the operator ideal J that are diagonal with respect to an arbitrary orthonormal basis, is that two-sided ideals are completely determined by their diagonal operators.

== Examples ==
Suppose H is a separable infinite-dimensional Hilbert space.

- Bounded operators. The improper two-sided ideal B(H) corresponds to l_{∞}.
- Compact operators. The proper and norm closed two-sided ideal K(H) corresponds to c_{0}, the space of sequences converging to zero.
- Finite rank operators. The smallest two-sided ideal F(H) of finite rank operators corresponds to c_{00}, the space of sequences with finite non-zero terms.
- Schatten p-ideals. The Schatten p-ideals L_{p}, p ≥ 1, correspond to the l_{p} sequence spaces. In particular, the trace class operators correspond to l_{1} and the Hilbert-Schmidt operators correspond to l_{2} .
- Weak-L_{p} ideals. The weak-L_{p} ideals L_{p,∞}, p ≥ 1, correspond to the weak-l_{p} sequence spaces.
- Lorentz ψ-ideals. The Lorentz ψ-ideals for an increasing concave function ψ : [0,∞) → [0,∞) correspond to the Lorentz sequence spaces.
