= Fredholm module =

In noncommutative geometry, a Fredholm module is a mathematical structure used to quantize the differential calculus. Such a module is, up to trivial changes, the same as the abstract elliptic operator introduced by Atiyah (1970).

== Definition ==
If A is an involutive algebra over the complex numbers C, then a Fredholm module over A consists of an involutive representation of A on a Hilbert space H, together with a self-adjoint operator F, of square 1 and such that the commutator

[F, a]

is a compact operator, for all a in A.
