= Nigel Kalton =

British mathematician

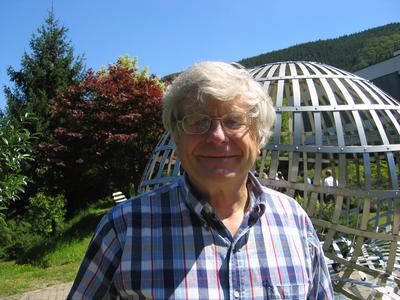
- Nigel Kalton in Oberwolfach, 2004
- Born: June 20, 1946; Bromley, Kent, England
- Died: August 31, 2010 (aged 64); Columbia, Missouri, US
- Education: Cambridge University
- Scientific career
- Fields: Mathematics
- Workplaces: University College of Swansea, University of Missouri
- Doctoral advisor: D.J.H. Garling

Nigel John Kalton (June 20, 1946 – August 31, 2010) was a British-American mathematician, known for his contributions to functional analysis.

== Career ==
Kalton was born in Bromley and educated at Dulwich College, where he excelled at both mathematics and chess. After studying mathematics at Trinity College, Cambridge, he received his PhD, which was awarded the Rayleigh Prize for research excellence, from Cambridge University in 1970. He then held positions at Lehigh University in Pennsylvania, Warwick, Swansea, University of Illinois, and Michigan State University, before becoming full professor at the University of Missouri, Columbia, in 1979.

He received the Stefan Banach Medal from the Polish Academy of Sciences in 2005. A conference in honour of his 60th birthday was held in Miami University of Ohio in 2006. He died in Columbia, Missouri, aged 64.

== Publications ==
- Kalton, N. J.; Peck, N. T.; Roberts, James W. (1984). An F-space sampler. Lecture Note Series. Vol. 89. Cambridge: Cambridge University Press. ISBN 0-521-27585-7. MR 0808777.
- Albiac, Fernando; Kalton, Nigel J. (2006). Topics in Banach space theory. Graduate Texts in Mathematics. Vol. 233. New York: Springer. ISBN 978-0-387-28141-4. MR 2192298. Albiac, Fernando; Kalton, Nigel J. (2016). 2nd edition. Springer. ISBN 9783319315577.
