= Bost–Connes system =

In mathematics, a Bost–Connes system is a quantum statistical dynamical system related to an algebraic number field, whose partition function is related to the Dedekind zeta function of the number field. Bost & Connes (1995) introduced Bost–Connes systems by constructing one for the rational numbers. Connes, Marcolli & Ramachandran (2005) extended the construction to imaginary quadratic fields.

Such systems have been studied for their connection with Hilbert's Twelfth Problem. In the case of a Bost–Connes system over Q, the absolute Galois group acts on the ground states of the system.
