= K-homology =

In mathematics, K-homology is a homology theory on the category of locally compact Hausdorff spaces. It classifies the elliptic pseudo-differential operators acting on the vector bundles over a space. In terms of $C^*$-algebras, it classifies the Fredholm modules over an algebra.

An operator homotopy between two Fredholm modules $(\mathcal{H},F_0,\Gamma)$ and $(\mathcal{H},F_1,\Gamma)$ is a norm continuous path of Fredholm modules, $t \mapsto (\mathcal{H},F_t,\Gamma)$, $t \in [0,1].$ Two Fredholm modules are then equivalent if they are related by unitary transformations or operator homotopies. The $K^0(A)$ group is the abelian group of equivalence classes of even Fredholm modules over A. The $K^1(A)$ group is the abelian group of equivalence classes of odd Fredholm modules over A. Addition is given by direct summation of Fredholm modules, and the inverse of $(\mathcal{H}, F, \Gamma)$ is $(\mathcal{H}, -F, -\Gamma).$
