= Finite-rank operator =

Linear operator in functional analysis

In functional analysis, a branch of mathematics, a finite-rank operator is a bounded linear operator between Banach spaces whose range is finite-dimensional.

== Finite-rank operators on a Hilbert space ==
=== A canonical form ===
Finite-rank operators are matrices (of finite size) transplanted to the infinite dimensional setting. As such, these operators may be described via linear algebra techniques.

From linear algebra, we know that a rectangular matrix, with complex entries, $M \in \mathbb{C}^{n \times m}$ has rank $1$ if and only if $M$ is of the form

$$M = \alpha \cdot u v^*, \quad \mbox{where} \quad \|u \| = \|v\| = 1 \quad \mbox{and} \quad \alpha \geq 0 .$$

Exactly the same argument shows that an operator $T$ on a Hilbert space $H$ is of rank $1$ if and only if

$$T h = \alpha \langle h, v\rangle u \quad \mbox{for all}  \quad h \in H ,$$

where the conditions on $\alpha, u, v$ are the same as in the finite dimensional case.

Therefore, by induction, an operator $T$ of finite rank $n$ takes the form

$$T h =  \sum _{i = 1}  ^n \alpha_i \langle h, v_i\rangle u_i \quad \mbox{for all} \quad h \in H ,$$

where $\{ u_i \}$ and $\{v_i\}$ are orthonormal bases. Notice this is essentially a restatement of singular value decomposition. This can be said to be a canonical form of finite-rank operators.

Generalizing slightly, if $n$ is now countably infinite and the sequence of positive numbers $\{ \alpha_i \}$ accumulate only at $0$, $T$ is then a compact operator, and one has the canonical form for compact operators.

Compact operators are trace class only if the series $\sum _i \alpha _i$ is convergent; a property that automatically holds for all finite-rank operators.

=== Algebraic property ===
The family of finite-rank operators $F(H)$ on a Hilbert space $H$ form a two-sided *-ideal in $L(H)$, the algebra of bounded operators on $H$. In fact it is the minimal element among such ideals, that is, any two-sided *-ideal $I$ in $L(H)$ must contain the finite-rank operators. This is not hard to prove. Take a non-zero operator $T\in I$, then $Tf = g$ for some $f, g \neq 0$. It suffices to have that for any $h, k\in H$, the rank-1 operator $S_{h, k}$ that maps $h$ to $k$ lies in $I$. Define $S_{h, f}$ to be the rank-1 operator that maps $h$ to $f$, and $S_{g,k}$ analogously. Then

$$S_{h,k} = S_{g,k} T S_{h,f}, \,$$

which means $S_{h, k}$ is in $I$ and this verifies the claim.

Some examples of two-sided *-ideals in $L(H)$ are the trace-class, Hilbert–Schmidt operators, and compact operators. $F(H)$ is dense in all three of these ideals, in their respective norms.

Since any two-sided ideal in $L(H)$ must contain $F(H)$, the algebra $L(H)$ is simple if and only if it is finite dimensional.

== Finite-rank operators on a Banach space ==
A finite-rank operator $T:U\to V$ between Banach spaces is a bounded operator such that its range is finite dimensional. Just as in the Hilbert space case, it can be written in the form

$$T h =  \sum _{i = 1}  ^n \langle u_i, h\rangle v_i \quad \mbox{for all} \quad h \in U ,$$

where now $v_i\in V$, and $u_i\in U'$ are bounded linear functionals on the space $U$.

A bounded linear functional is a particular case of a finite-rank operator, namely of rank one.
