= Noncommutative geometry =

Branch of mathematics

Noncommutative geometry (NCG) is a branch of mathematics that studies geometric ideas through noncommutative algebras. In ordinary geometry, a space can often be studied by means of a commutative algebra of functions on it; noncommutative geometry extends this viewpoint to algebras in which the product of two elements need not commute. Such algebras are treated as analogues of algebras of functions on generalized, or "noncommutative", spaces.

The subject is not a single formalism. It includes operator-algebraic methods based on C*-algebras, von Neumann algebras, and spectral triples; algebraic approaches to noncommutative rings and graded algebras; and constructions related to deformation quantization, groupoid C*-algebras, cyclic homology, and K-theory. A standard example is the noncommutative torus, whose algebra is generated by two unitary elements satisfying a twisted commutation relation and which has served as a test case for noncommutative versions of vector bundles, connections, curvature and index theory.

== History and scope ==
Ideas now grouped under noncommutative geometry developed from several areas, including operator algebra theory, index theory, algebraic geometry, quantum mechanics and ergodic theory. The term is particularly associated with work of Alain Connes, who introduced a framework in which operator algebras, cyclic cohomology and generalized differential forms could be used to study spaces that are poorly described by ordinary point-set methods.

The scope of the field is broad. In the operator-algebraic tradition, noncommutative algebras are interpreted as algebras of functions on noncommutative topological, measure-theoretic, smooth or metric spaces. In noncommutative algebraic geometry, one studies associative rings and categories of modules as analogues of coordinate rings and categories of sheaves. Deformation quantization and quantum groups are related areas when their noncommutative algebras are interpreted geometrically, although they are also studied as independent subjects.

== Motivation ==
The main motivation is to extend the duality between spaces and algebras of functions. If $X$ is a compact Hausdorff space, the commutative C*-algebra $C(X)$ of complex-valued continuous functions determines $X$ up to homeomorphism, by the commutative Gelfand representation. Similarly, the category of affine schemes in algebraic geometry is dual to the category of commutative rings, and many geometric properties of a scheme can be studied through categories of sheaves or modules.

In these classical examples, geometry is encoded algebraically. Addition and multiplication of functions are defined pointwise, and the commutativity of multiplication reflects the fact that functions take scalar values on an ordinary set of points. Noncommutative geometry starts from the observation that many algebras arising naturally in analysis, geometry and physics are not commutative but still retain geometric features. Rather than first defining a space and then its functions, one studies a noncommutative algebra directly and interprets it as the algebra of functions on a generalized space.

A noncommutative algebra generally has too few characters to reconstruct a point-set space in the usual way. Consequently, noncommutative geometry often replaces points by other structures, such as representations, modules, traces, states, K-theory classes, cyclic cocycles or categories. This shift is one reason that different versions of noncommutative geometry emphasize different invariants and notions of equivalence, such as Morita equivalence.

=== Motivation from ergodic theory ===
Some of the operator-algebraic constructions used in noncommutative geometry have roots in ergodic theory. In particular, crossed-product algebras associated with group actions can be viewed as algebras of functions on quotient spaces that may be singular or may not have satisfactory ordinary quotient spaces. Earlier ideas such as George Mackey's virtual subgroup theory anticipated the use of operator algebras to treat ergodic actions as generalized homogeneous spaces.

== Operator-algebraic noncommutative spaces ==
=== C*-algebras and von Neumann algebras ===
The formal duals of noncommutative C*-algebras are often called noncommutative topological spaces. This terminology is motivated by the Gelfand–Naimark theorem, which identifies commutative C*-algebras with algebras of continuous functions on locally compact Hausdorff spaces. A noncommutative C*-algebra may therefore be studied as though it were the algebra of continuous functions on a space whose ordinary set of points has been replaced by operator-algebraic data.

In a similar way, commutative von Neumann algebras correspond to measure-theoretic objects, while noncommutative von Neumann algebras are often regarded as noncommutative measure spaces. This viewpoint is useful in areas such as noncommutative integration, Tomita–Takesaki theory and the classification theory of operator algebras.

=== Groupoids and crossed products ===
Groupoid C*-algebras and crossed product algebras provide many basic examples. If a group acts on a space, the crossed product combines functions on the space with the action of the group. When the quotient by the action is singular, non-Hausdorff or otherwise ill behaved, the crossed product may still retain useful geometric and dynamical information. This approach is important for foliations, tilings, dynamical systems and examples from mathematical physics.

== Spectral triples and noncommutative differentiable manifolds ==
A smooth compact Riemannian manifold can be studied using analytic data. For a compact spin manifold $M$, the algebra $C^\infty(M)$ acts by multiplication on the Hilbert space $L^2(M,S)$ of square-integrable spinors, and the Dirac operator $D$ encodes the metric. This motivates the notion of a spectral triple.

A spectral triple $(A,H,D)$ consists of an algebra $A$ represented on a Hilbert space $H$, together with a usually unbounded self-adjoint operator $D$, such that $(1+D^2)^{-1/2}$ is compact and the commutators $[D,a]$ are bounded for elements $a$ in a suitable dense subalgebra of $A$. Additional structures, such as a grading, a real structure, regularity and finiteness conditions, are imposed in many applications.

Spectral triples allow metric information to be expressed algebraically. For a classical compact Riemannian spin manifold, Connes' distance formula recovers the geodesic distance by

$$d(x,y)=\sup\{|f(x)-f(y)|:\ \|[D,f]\|\leq 1\}.$$

Connes' reconstruction theorem states, roughly, that a commutative spectral triple satisfying appropriate regularity, finiteness and orientability hypotheses arises from a compact smooth manifold.

Spectral triples are also used to define noncommutative analogues of differential forms, vector bundles, gauge fields, metric data and index pairings. They are central in Connes' operator-algebraic formulation of noncommutative geometry and in applications to particle physics and index theory.

== Differential calculi and connections ==
Differential geometry over a noncommutative algebra requires a replacement for differential forms. One common starting point is a differential graded algebra $\Omega^\bullet(A)$ with $\Omega^0(A)=A$ and a derivation $d:A\to\Omega^1(A)$ satisfying the Leibniz rule. Different choices of differential calculus can lead to different geometries on the same algebra.

If $E$ is a right $A$-module, a connection on $E$ relative to a chosen differential calculus is a linear map

$$\nabla:E\to E\otimes_A\Omega^1(A)$$

satisfying

$$\nabla(ea)=\nabla(e)a+e\otimes da$$

for $e\in E$ and $a\in A$. The curvature of such a connection is obtained by extending $\nabla$ to higher-degree forms and taking $\nabla^2$. When $E$ is a finitely generated projective module, it plays the role of the module of sections of a vector bundle.

In the setting of spectral triples, one often uses differential one-forms generated by finite sums of operators $a[D,b]$. Connections on modules then give noncommutative analogues of gauge potentials. In more restrictive settings, one can also study Hermitian connections, torsion, metric compatibility and analogues of Levi-Civita connections, but there is no single universal definition that covers all approaches to noncommutative geometry.

A Connes connection is a connection in this general noncommutative sense, introduced in work of Connes and later developed in related forms by Joachim Cuntz and Daniel Quillen. The precise definition depends on the differential calculus or homological framework being used.

== Noncommutative affine and projective schemes ==
In algebraic geometry, the category of affine schemes is dual to the category of commutative rings. A basic noncommutative analogue is to regard associative unital rings as coordinate rings of noncommutative affine spaces. Unlike the commutative case, there is no universally accepted category of all noncommutative schemes, and several frameworks coexist.

One influential construction is noncommutative projective geometry. If $A$ is a graded algebra, the quotient category $\operatorname{qgr} A$, obtained from graded modules by factoring out a suitable subcategory of torsion modules, is treated as an analogue of the category of coherent sheaves on $\operatorname{Proj} A$. This approach, developed by Michael Artin and James J. Zhang, extends features of projective geometry to noncommutative graded algebras under hypotheses such as noetherianity and regularity.

Many familiar theorems have analogues in this setting. For example, forms of Serre duality have been proved for noncommutative projective schemes satisfying suitable finiteness conditions. Other approaches, including those of Alexander Rosenberg and of Freddy Van Oystaeyen and collaborators, use localization theory, categories of quasicoherent sheaves and Grothendieck-topological ideas to formulate noncommutative schemes.

== Invariants and index theory ==
A major goal of noncommutative geometry is to extend topological and geometric invariants from ordinary spaces to noncommutative algebras. Operator K-theory and K-homology provide analogues of vector bundles and elliptic operators. Cyclic homology and cyclic cohomology provide noncommutative analogues of de Rham homology and cohomology. The Chern character connects these theories and allows pairings that produce numerical invariants.

Connes introduced cyclic cohomology as a tool for index theory on noncommutative algebras. In the setting of spectral triples, cyclic cocycles represent characteristic classes, and their pairing with K-theory generalizes the pairing between cohomology and vector bundles on manifolds. The Jaffe–Lesniewski–Osterwalder cocycle, or JLO cocycle, gives a Chern character for certain Fredholm modules and spectral triples.

Noncommutative index theory extends classical results such as the Atiyah–Singer index theorem. The local index formula of Connes and Moscovici gives a way to compute index pairings for suitable spectral triples using local expressions in cyclic cohomology.

== Examples of noncommutative spaces ==
- The noncommutative torus is generated by unitary elements $U$ and $V$ satisfying $VU=e^{2\pi i\theta}UV$. It is a deformation of the algebra of functions on the ordinary torus and has been studied through C*-algebraic methods, projective modules, Morita equivalence and Yang–Mills theory.
- In deformation quantization, the commutative algebra of functions on a Poisson manifold is replaced by a noncommutative product depending on a formal parameter. The Moyal product is the standard example for flat phase space, and Kontsevich proved a general formality theorem for deformation quantization of finite-dimensional Poisson manifolds.
- C*-algebras associated with foliations encode transverse geometric information when the ordinary leaf space is singular or non-Hausdorff.
- Crossed products arising from dynamical systems, including actions connected with number theory such as the Gauss map on continued fractions, provide examples where orbit spaces are studied by noncommutative algebras.
- The fuzzy sphere replaces the algebra of functions on the two-sphere by finite-dimensional matrix algebras and is used as a finite-mode approximation to geometric and field-theoretic models.
- Quantum spacetime models replace commuting coordinate functions by noncommuting operators. One example is the Doplicher–Fredenhagen–Roberts model, motivated by combining quantum-mechanical uncertainty with gravitational considerations.
- Finite-dimensional matrix algebras and finite spectral triples provide simple noncommutative spaces. They appear both as examples in the theory and as ingredients in almost-commutative geometries.

== Applications in mathematical physics ==
Noncommutative geometry is used in several areas of mathematical physics. In quantum mechanics, noncommuting position and momentum observables motivate the replacement of classical phase-space functions by noncommutative algebras of operators or by star-product algebras. In condensed matter theory, noncommutative geometry has been applied to the integer quantum Hall effect and to aperiodic media, where noncommutative C*-algebras can encode disorder, magnetic translations and gap-labeling data.

In high-energy theory, noncommutative spaces have appeared in matrix models and in some limits of string theory. The spectral action program studies physical Lagrangians associated with spectral triples, including almost-commutative geometries related to the Standard Model of particle physics. These uses are active research topics and do not imply that noncommutative geometry is the only mathematical framework for the corresponding physical problems.

The fuzzy sphere has also been used as a finite-dimensional regularization in numerical and theoretical studies, including recent work on conformal field theory and critical phenomena.

== See also ==
- Algebraic K-theory
- Commutativity
- Cyclic homology
- Deformation quantization
- Fredholm module
- Fuzzy sphere
- Groupoid C*-algebra
- K-homology
- Koszul connection
- Morita equivalence
- Moyal product
- Noncommutative algebraic geometry
- Noncommutative torus
- Noncommutative topology
- Phase space formulation
- Quasi-free algebra
- Spectral action principle
- Spectral triple
