= Klaus Fredenhagen =

German physicist

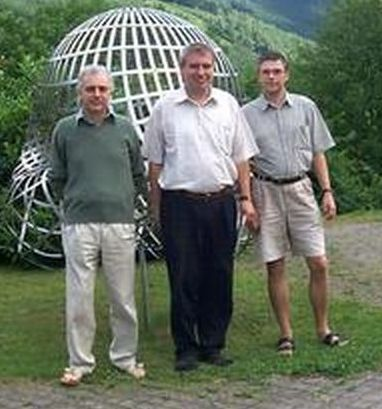
- Klaus Fredenhagen (middle) with Roberto Longo (left) and Karl-Henning Rehren (right), Oberwolfach 2002
- Born: 1 December 1947; Celle, Germany
- Education: University of Hamburg
- Scientific career
- Fields: Physics
- Workplaces: University of Hamburg
- Thesis: Die Quantenelektrodynamik mit einem Freiheitsgrad fuer das Photonfeld (1976)
- Doctoral advisor: Gert Roepstorff; Rudolf Haag

Klaus Fredenhagen (born 1 December 1947) is a German theoretical physicist who works on the mathematical foundations of quantum field theory.

== Biography ==
Klaus Fredenhagen was born on 1 December 1947 in Celle, a German city in Lower Saxony. He graduated in 1976 from the University of Hamburg under the supervision of Gert Roepstorff and Rudolf Haag. In 1985 he became a privatdozent and in 1990 a full professor at the second theory institute of the Hamburg University. Since 2013 he has been a professor emeritus and has continued to be active in research.

== Scientific career ==
His research interests are algebraic quantum field theory and quantum field theory in curved spacetime. In 1981 he proved the existence of antiparticles in massive quantum field theories without using the CPT-invariance. In 1990 he and Rudolf Haag made important contributions to the understanding of the Hawking radiation of black holes on a rigorous mathematical footing. In 1994, together with Sergio Doplicher and John E. Roberts, he investigated the mathematical foundations of quantum gravity in terms of the quantum structure of spacetime at the Planck scale. In 1996, together with Romeo Brunetti, he started working on the generalization of the Epstein-Glaser renormalization procedure of interacting quantum field theories in curved spacetime using techniques from the microlocal analysis. He is currently working, together with Detlev Buchholz, on a new C*-algebraic approach to interacting quantum field theories.

== Honors and awards ==
In 1987 Klaus Fredenhagen was awarded the physics prize of the Göttingen Academy of Sciences and in 1997 he was Leibniz Professor at the University of Leipzig. In December 2017 the workshop Quantum Physics meets Mathematics was held in honor of his 70th birthday at the University of Hamburg.

== Selected publications ==
=== Edited books ===
- Fredenhagen, Klaus (2015). "An Introduction to Algebraic Quantum Field Theory". In Brunetti, Romeo; Dappiaggi, Claudio; Fredenhagen, Klaus; Yngvason, Jakob (eds.). Advances in Algebraic Quantum Field Theory. Mathematical Physics Studies. Springer International Publishing. pp. 1–30. Bibcode:2015aaqf.book.....B. doi:10.1007/978-3-319-21353-8. ISBN 978-3-319-21352-1.
- Brunetti, Romeo; Fredenhagen, Klaus (2009). "Quantum Field Theory on Curved Backgrounds". In Fredenhagen, Klaus; Bär, Christian (eds.). Quantum Field Theory on Curved Backgrounds - concepts and mathematical foundations. Lecture Notes in Physics. Vol. 786. Springer. p. 129. arXiv:0901.2063. doi:10.1007/978-3-642-02780-2_5. ISBN 978-3-642-02779-6. S2CID 8325525.

=== Articles ===
- Doplicher, Sergio; Fredenhagen, Klaus; Roberts, John E. (1995). "The quantum structure of spacetime at the Planck scale and quantum fields". Communications in Mathematical Physics. 172 (1): 187–220. arXiv:hep-th/0303037. Bibcode:1995CMaPh.172..187D. doi:10.1007/BF02104515. S2CID 16206928.
- Doplicher, Sergio; Fredenhagen, Klaus; Roberts, John E (1994). "Space-time quantization induced by classical gravity". Physics Letters B. 331 (1–2): 39–44. Bibcode:1994PhLB..331...39D. doi:10.1016/0370-2693(94)90940-7.
- Brunetti, Romeo; Fredenhagen, Klaus; Verch, Rainer (2003). "The Generally covariant locality principle: A New paradigm for local quantum field theory". Communications in Mathematical Physics. 237 (1–2): 31–68. arXiv:math-ph/0112041. Bibcode:2003CMaPh.237...31B. doi:10.1007/s00220-003-0815-7. S2CID 119669414.
- Brunetti, Romeo; Fredenhagen, Klaus (2000). "Microlocal analysis and interacting quantum field theories: Renormalization on physical backgrounds". Communications in Mathematical Physics. 208 (3): 623–661. arXiv:math-ph/9903028. Bibcode:2000CMaPh.208..623B. doi:10.1007/s002200050004. S2CID 13861991.
- Fredenhagen, Klaus (1981). "On the Existence of Anti-particles". Communications in Mathematical Physics. 79 (1): 141–151. Bibcode:1981CMaPh..79..141F. doi:10.1007/BF01208291. S2CID 120318097.
- Fredenhagen, Klaus; Haag, Rudolf (1990). "On the Derivation of Hawking Radiation Associated With the Formation of a Black Hole". Communications in Mathematical Physics. 127 (2): 273–284. Bibcode:1990CMaPh.127..273F. doi:10.1007/BF02096757. S2CID 122962630.
- Buchholz, Derlev; Fredenhagen, Klaus (2020). "A C*-algebraic approach to interacting quantum field theories" (PDF). Communications in Mathematical Physics. 377 (2): 947–969. arXiv:1902.06062. Bibcode:2020CMaPh.377..947B. doi:10.1007/s00220-020-03700-9. S2CID 92987721.

== See also ==
- Local quantum physics
- Microlocal analysis
- Principle of locality
- Quantum field theory
- Quantum field theory in curved spacetime
- Quantum gravity
