= Kastler =

Kastler is a surname. Notable people with the surname include:

- Alfred Kastler (1902–1984), French physicist and Nobel Prize laureate
- Daniel Kastler (1926– 2015) French theoretical physicist, son of Alfred
- Henri Kastler (1863–1957), French philatelist
- Martin Kastler (born 1974), German politician and member of the European Parliament

== See also ==
- Lycée Alfred Kastler (disambiguation)
- Kastler-Brossel Laboratory, is a research laboratory specializing in fundamental physics of quantum systems
- Kadison–Kastler metric, is a metric on the space of C*-algebras on a fixed Hilbert space
