= Algebraic holography =

Formulation of holography using algebraic QFT

Algebraic holography, also sometimes called Rehren duality, is an attempt to understand the holographic principle of quantum gravity within the framework of algebraic quantum field theory, due to Karl-Henning Rehren. It is sometimes described as an alternative formulation of the AdS/CFT correspondence of string theory, but some string theorists reject this statement . The theories discussed in algebraic holography do not satisfy the usual holographic principle because their entropy follows a higher-dimensional power law.

== Rehren's duality ==
The conformal boundary of an anti-de Sitter space (or its universal covering space) is the conformal Minkowski space (or its universal covering space) with one fewer dimension. Let's work with the universal covering spaces. In AQFT, a QFT in the conformal space is given by a conformally covariant net of C* algebras over the conformal space and the QFT in AdS is given a covariant net of C* algebras over AdS. Any two distinct null geodesic hypersurfaces of codimension 1 which intersect at more than just a point in AdS divides AdS into four distinct regions, two of which are spacelike. Any of the two spacelike regions is called a wedge. It's a geometrical fact that the conformal boundary of a wedge is a double cone in the conformal boundary and that any double cone in the conformal boundary is associated with a unique wedge. In other words, we have a one-to-one correspondence between double cones in CFT and wedges in AdS. It's easy to check that any CFT defined in terms of algebras over the double cones which satisfy the Haag–Kastler axioms also gives rise to a net over AdS which satisfies these axioms if we assume that the algebra associated with a wedge is the same as the algebra associated with its corresponding double cone and vice versa. This correspondence between AQFTs on both sides is called algebraic holography.

Unlike the usual AdS/CFT correspondence, the Rehren-dual theory on the AdS side does not appear to be a theory of quantum gravity as there is no apparent diffeomorphism covariance on the AdS side. Also, if the algebra associated with any double cone in AdS is nontrivial (i.e. contains more than just the identity), the corresponding CFT does not satisfy primitive causality. From this, we can conclude that the AdS Rehren-dual of any realistic CFT does not have any local degrees of freedom (wedges are noncompact).

== Differences when compared to AdS/CFT ==
- "In AdS/CFT, the boundary values of bulk fields are sources for operators of the boundary theory. In Rehren Duality, the boundary values of the bulk fields are the operators of the boundary theory.
- "In AdS/CFT, the bulk theory is necessarily a gravitational one. The source for the conserved stress tensor of the boundary theory is the boundary value of the bulk metric tensor. In Rehren Duality, the bulk theory is an 'ordinary' (non-gravitational) QFT."
