= Karl-Henning Rehren =

German physicist

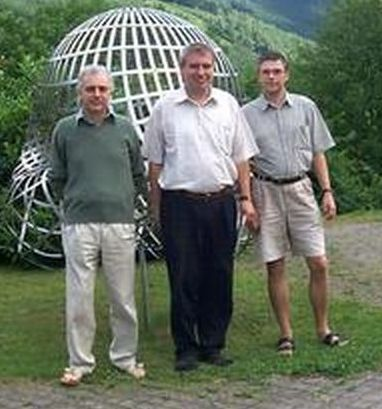
- Karl-Henning Rehren (right) with Klaus Fredenhagen (middle) and Roberto Longo (left), Oberwolfach 2002
- Born: 1956 (age 69–70); Celle, West Germany
- Education: University of Heidelberg; University of Freiburg
- Known for: Rehren duality
- Scientific career
- Fields: Physics
- Workplaces: Free University of Berlin; Utrecht University; University of Hamburg; Osnabrück University; University of Göttingen
- Thesis: Zur invarianten Quantisierung des relativistischen freien Strings (1984)
- Doctoral advisor: Klaus Pohlmeyer

Karl-Henning Rehren (born 1956 in Celle) is a German physicist who focuses on algebraic quantum field theory.

== Biography ==
Rehren studied physics in Heidelberg, Paris and Freiburg. In Freiburg he received his PhD (advisor Klaus Pohlmeyer) in 1984. Habilitation 1991 in Berlin. Since 1997 he teaches physics in Göttingen.

He became notable outside his field, especially among string theorists, in 1999 when he discovered the Algebraic holography (also called Rehren duality), a relation between quantum field theories AdS_{d+1} and conformal quantum field theories on d-dimensional Minkowski spacetime, which is similar in scope to the Holographic principle. This work has no direct relation to the more well known Maldacena duality, but refers to the more general statement of the AdS/CFT correspondence by Edward Witten. It is generally accepted that the relation found by Rehren does not provide a proof for Witten's conjecture and is thus considered an independent result.

== Selected publications ==
- Fredenhagen, Klaus; Rehren, Karl-Henning; Seiler, Erhard (2007). "Quantum Field Theory: Where We Are". Approaches to Fundamental Physics. Lecture Notes in Physics. Vol. 721. pp. 61–87. arXiv:hep-th/0603155. doi:10.1007/978-3-540-71117-9_4. ISBN 978-3540711179. S2CID 18249741.
- Rehren, Karl-Henning (2000). "Algebraic holography". Annales Henri Poincaré. 1 (4): 607–623. arXiv:hep-th/9905179. Bibcode:2000AnHP....1..607R. doi:10.1007/PL00001009. S2CID 5966399.

== See also ==
- AdS/CFT correspondence
- Axiomatic quantum field theory
- Conformal field theory
- Local quantum physics
- Quantum field theory
- Rehren duality
