= Weinberg–Witten theorem =

Constraints on possible particle properties

In theoretical physics, the Weinberg–Witten (WW) theorem, proved by Steven Weinberg and Edward Witten, states that massless particles (either composite or elementary) with spin j > 1/2 cannot carry a Lorentz-covariant current, while massless particles with spin j > 1 cannot carry a Lorentz-covariant stress-energy. The theorem is usually interpreted to mean that the graviton (j = 2) cannot be a composite particle in a relativistic quantum field theory.

== Background ==
During the 1980s, preon theories, technicolor and the like were very popular and some people speculated that gravity might be an emergent phenomenon or that gluons might be composite. Weinberg and Witten, on the other hand, developed a no-go theorem that excludes, under very general assumptions, the hypothetical composite and emergent theories. Decades later new theories of emergent gravity are proposed and some high-energy physicists are still using this theorem to try and refute such theories. Because most of these emergent theories aren't Lorentz covariant, the WW theorem doesn't apply. The violation of Lorentz covariance, however, usually leads to other problems.

== Theorem ==
Weinberg and Witten proved two separate results. According to them, the first is due to Sidney Coleman, who did not publish it:

- A 3 + 1D QFT (quantum field theory) with a conserved 4-vector current $J^\mu$ (see four-current) which is Poincaré covariant (and gauge invariant if there happens to be any gauge symmetry which hasn't been gauge-fixed) does not admit massless particles with helicity |h| > 1/2 that also have nonzero charges associated with the conserved current in question.
- A 3 + 1D QFT with a non-zero conserved stress–energy tensor $T^{\mu \nu}$ which is Poincaré covariant (and gauge invariant if there happens to be any gauge symmetry which hasn't been gauge-fixed) does not admit massless particles with helicity |h| > 1.

== A sketch of the proof ==
The conserved charge Q is given by $\int d^3x\, J^0$. We shall consider the matrix elements of the charge and of the current $J^\mu$ for one-particle asymptotic states, of equal helicity, $|p \rangle$ and $|p' \rangle$, labeled by their lightlike 4-momenta. We shall consider the case in which $(p - p')$ isn't null, which means that the momentum transfer is spacelike. Let q be the eigenvalue of those states for the charge operator Q, so that:

$$\begin{align}
q\delta^3(\vec{p}'-\vec{p}) =\langle p'|Q|p\rangle &= \int d^3x\, \langle p'|J^0(\vec{x},0)|p\rangle \\
& =\int d^3x\, \langle p'|e^{-i\vec{P}\cdot\vec{x}}J^0(0,0)e^{i\vec{P}\cdot\vec{x}}|p\rangle \\
& =\int d^3x\, e^{i(\vec{p}-\vec{p}')\cdot \vec{x}} \langle p'|J^0(0,0)|p\rangle = (2\pi)^3\delta^3(\vec{p}'-\vec{p})\langle p'|J^0(0,0)|p\rangle
\end{align}$$

where we have now made used of translational covariance, which is part of the Poincaré covariance. Thus:

$$\langle p'|J^0(0)|p\rangle =\frac{q}{(2\pi)^3}$$

with $q\neq 0$.

Let's transform to a reference frame where p moves along the positive z-axis and p′ moves along the negative z-axis. This is always possible for any spacelike momentum transfer.

In this reference frame, $\langle p' | J^0 (0) | p \rangle$ and $\langle p' | J^3 (0) | p \rangle$ change by the phase factor $e^{i(h-(-h))\theta}=e^{2ih\theta}$ under rotations by θ counterclockwise about the z-axis whereas $\langle p' | J^1 (0) + i J^2 (0) | p \rangle$ and $\langle p' | J^1 (0) - i J^2 (0) | p \rangle$ change by the phase factors $e^{i(2h+1)\theta}$ and $e^{i(2h-1)\theta}$ respectively.

If h is nonzero, we need to specify the phases of states. In general, this can't be done in a Lorentz-invariant way (see Thomas precession), but the one particle Hilbert space is Lorentz-covariant. So, if we make any arbitrary but fixed choice for the phases, then each of the matrix components in the previous paragraph has to be invariant under the rotations about the z-axis. So, unless |h| = 0 or 1/2, all of the components have to be zero.

Weinberg and Witten did not assume the continuity

$$\langle p|J^0(0)|p\rangle =\lim_{p'\rightarrow p}\langle p'|J^0(0)|p\rangle$$.

Rather, the authors argue that the physical (i.e., the measurable) quantum numbers of a massless particle are always defined by the matrix elements in the limit of zero momentum, defined for a sequence of spacelike momentum transfers. Also, $\delta^3(\vec{p}'-\vec{p})$ in the first equation can be replaced by "smeared out" Dirac delta function, which corresponds to performing the $d^3x$ volume integral over a finite box.

The proof of the second part of theorem is completely analogous, replacing the matrix elements of the current with the matrix elements of the stress–energy tensor $T^{\mu \nu}$:

$p^\mu=\int d^3x\, T^{\mu 0}(\vec{x},0)$ and

$$\langle p|T^{0 0}(0)|p\rangle =\frac{E}{(2\pi)^3}$$

with $E\neq 0$.

For spacelike momentum transfers, we can go to the reference frame where p′ + p is along the t-axis and p′ − p is along the z-axis. In this reference frame, the components of $\langle p'|\mathbf{T}(0)|p\rangle$ transforms as $e^{i(2h-2)\theta}$, $e^{i(2h-1)\theta}$,$e^{i(2h)\theta}$, $e^{i(2h+1)\theta}$ or $e^{i(2h+2)\theta}$ under a rotation by θ about the z-axis. Similarly, we can conclude that $|h|=0,\frac{1}{2},1$

Note that this theorem also applies to free field theories. If they contain massless particles with the "wrong" helicity/charge, they have to be gauge theories.

== Ruling out emergent theories ==
What does this theorem have to do with emergence/composite theories?

If let's say gravity is an emergent theory of a fundamentally flat theory over a flat Minkowski spacetime, then by Noether's theorem, we have a conserved stress–energy tensor which is Poincaré covariant. If the theory has an internal gauge symmetry (of the Yang–Mills kind), we may pick the Belinfante–Rosenfeld stress–energy tensor which is gauge-invariant. As there is no fundamental diffeomorphism symmetry, we don't have to worry about that this tensor isn't BRST-closed under diffeomorphisms. So, the Weinberg–Witten theorem applies and we can't get a massless spin-2 (i.e. helicity ±2) composite/emergent graviton.

If we have a theory with a fundamental conserved 4-current associated with a global symmetry, then we can't have emergent/composite massless spin-1 particles which are charged under that global symmetry.

== Theories where the theorem is inapplicable ==
=== Nonabelian gauge theories ===
There are a number of ways to see why nonabelian Yang–Mills theories in the Coulomb phase don't violate this theorem. Yang–Mills theories don't have any conserved 4-current associated with the Yang–Mills charges that are both Poincaré covariant and gauge invariant. Noether's theorem gives a current which is conserved and Poincaré covariant, but not gauge invariant. As |p> is really an element of the BRST cohomology, i.e. a quotient space, it is really an equivalence class of states. As such, $\langle p'|J|p\rangle$ is only well defined if J is BRST-closed. But if J isn't gauge-invariant, then J isn't BRST-closed in general. The current defined as $J^\mu(x)\equiv\frac{\delta}{\delta A_\mu(x)}S_\mathrm{matter}$ is not conserved because it satisfies $D_\mu J^\mu=0$ instead of $\partial_\mu J^\mu=0$ where D is the covariant derivative. The current defined after a gauge-fixing like the Coulomb gauge is conserved but isn't Lorentz covariant.

=== Spontaneously broken gauge theories ===
The gauge bosons associated with spontaneously broken symmetries are massive. For example, in QCD, we have electrically charged rho mesons which can be described by an emergent hidden gauge symmetry which is spontaneously broken. Therefore, there is nothing in principle stopping us from having composite preon models of W and Z bosons.

On a similar note, even though the photon is charged under the SU(2) weak symmetry (because it is the gauge boson associated with a linear combination of weak isospin and hypercharge), it is also moving through a condensate of such charges, and so, isn't an exact eigenstate of the weak charges and this theorem doesn't apply either.

=== Massive gravity ===
On a similar note, it is possible to have a composite/emergent theory of massive gravity.

=== General relativity ===
In GR, we have diffeomorphisms and A|ψ> (over an element |ψ> of the BRST cohomology) only makes sense if A is BRST-closed. There are no local BRST-closed operators and this includes any stress–energy tensor that we can think of.

As an alternate explanation, note that the stress tensor for pure GR vanishes (this statement is equivalent to the vacuum Einstein equation) and the stress tensor for GR coupled to matter is just the matter stress tensor. The latter is not conserved, $\partial^\mu T_{\mu\nu}^{\text{matter}} \neq 0$, but rather $\nabla^\mu T_{\mu\nu}^{\text{matter}} =0$ where $\nabla^\mu$ is the covariant derivative.

=== Induced gravity ===
In induced gravity, the fundamental theory is also diffeomorphism invariant and the same comment applies.

=== Seiberg duality ===
If we take N=1 chiral super QCD with N_{c} colors and N_{f} flavors with $N_f-2 \ge N_c > \frac{2}{3}N_f$, then by the Seiberg duality, this theory is dual to a nonabelian $SU(N_f-N_c)$ gauge theory which is trivial (i.e. free) in the infrared limit. As such, the dual theory doesn't suffer from any infraparticle problem or a continuous mass spectrum. Despite this, the dual theory is still a nonabelian Yang–Mills theory. Because of this, the dual magnetic current still suffers from all the same problems even though it is an "emergent current". Free theories aren't exempt from the Weinberg–Witten theorem.

=== Conformal field theory ===
In a conformal field theory, the only truly massless particles are noninteracting singletons (see singleton field). The other "particles"/bound states have a continuous mass spectrum which can take on any arbitrarily small nonzero mass. So, we can have spin-3/2 and spin-2 bound states with arbitrarily small masses but still not violate the theorem. In other words, they are infraparticles.

=== Infraparticles ===
Two otherwise identical charged infraparticles moving with different velocities belong to different superselection sectors. Let's say they have momenta p′ and p respectively. Then as J^{μ}(0) is a local neutral operator, it does not map between different superselection sectors. So, $<p'|J^\mu(0)|p>$ is zero. The only way |p′'> and |p> can belong in the same sector is if they have the same velocity, which means that they are proportional to each other, i.e. a null or zero momentum transfer, which isn't covered in the proof. So, infraparticles violate the continuity assumption

$$\langle p|J^0(0)|p\rangle =\lim_{p'\rightarrow p}\langle p'|J^0(0)|p\rangle$$

This doesn't mean of course that the momentum of a charge particle can't change by some spacelike momentum. It only means that if the incoming state is a one infraparticle state, then the outgoing state contains an infraparticle together with a number of soft quanta. This is nothing other than the inevitable bremsstrahlung. But this also means that the outgoing state isn't a one particle state.

=== Theories with nonlocal charges ===
Obviously, a nonlocal charge does not have a local 4-current and a theory with a nonlocal 4-momentum does not have a local stress–energy tensor.

=== Acoustic metric theories and analog model of gravity ===
These theories are not Lorentz covariant. However, some of these theories can give rise to an approximate emergent Lorentz symmetry at low energies.

=== Superstring theory ===
Superstring theory defined over a background metric (possibly with some fluxes) over a 10D space which is the product of a flat 4D Minkowski space and a compact 6D space has a massless graviton in its spectrum. This is an emergent particle coming from the vibrations of a superstring. Let's look at how we would go about defining the stress–energy tensor. The background is given by g (the metric) and a couple of other fields. The effective action is a functional of the background. The VEV of the stress–energy tensor is then defined as the functional derivative

$$T^{MN}(x)\equiv \frac{1}{\sqrt{-g}}\frac{\delta}{\delta g_{MN}(x)}\Gamma[\text{background}].$$

The stress-energy operator is defined as a vertex operator corresponding to this infinitesimal change in the background metric.

Not all backgrounds are permissible. Superstrings have to have superconformal symmetry, which is a super generalization of Weyl symmetry, in order to be consistent but they are only superconformal when propagating over some special backgrounds (which satisfy the Einstein field equations plus some higher order corrections). Because of this, the effective action is only defined over these special backgrounds and the functional derivative is not well-defined. The vertex operator for the stress–energy tensor at a point also doesn't exist.
