= Sergio Doplicher =

Italian mathematical physicist (1940–2025)

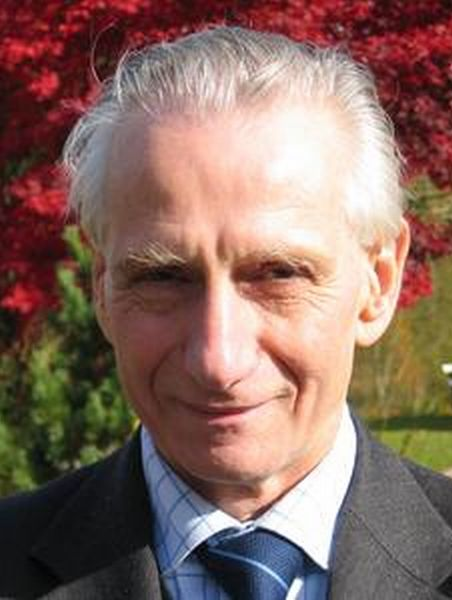
- Doplicher in 2005
- Born: 30 December 1940; Trieste, Kingdom of Italy
- Died: 9 September 2025 (aged 84); Boves, Italy
- Education: Sapienza University of Rome
- Awards: Humboldt Prize (2004); Premio Presidente della Repubblica (2011)
- Scientific career
- Fields: Physics; Mathematics
- Workplaces: Sapienza University of Rome
- Academic advisors: Giovanni Jona-Lasinio
- Notable students: Roberto Longo

Sergio Doplicher (Italian: [ˈsɛrdʒo ˈdɔpliker]; 30 December 1940 – 9 September 2025) was an Italian mathematical physicist, who mainly dealt with the mathematical foundations of quantum field theory and quantum gravity.

== Life and career ==
Sergio Doplicher was born on 30 December 1940 in Trieste and graduated in Physics at the Sapienza University of Rome in 1963 under the supervision of Giovanni Jona-Lasinio. From 1976 to 2011 he was full professor of quantum mechanics in the mathematics department of Sapienza University, retiring there in 2011 as professor emeritus.

He was known for his research based on the Haag–Kastler axioms and for his collaboration with Rudolf Haag. With John E. Roberts and Haag, he examined superselection rules in the algebraic quantum field theory, providing the first proof of the spin–statistics theorem entirely based only on first principles. Doplicher and Roberts also proved a reconstruction theorem for the algebra of quantum fields and the compact group of global internal symmetries from the algebra of the observables. In other collaborations, Doplicher studied the local aspects of superselection rules. After introducing the split-property, he derived exact current algebras and a weak form of a quantum Noether theorem.

Later in his career, Doplicher dealt with the mathematical foundations of quantum gravity in terms of the quantum structure of space-time at the Planck scale. He also addressed the problem of measurement in local quantum physics.

He was the author of the first article of the first number of the scientific journal Communications in Mathematical Physics.

Doplicher died in Boves on 9 September 2025, at the age of 84.

== Honours and awards ==
Doplicher was an Invited Speaker at the International Congress of Mathematicians in Kyoto in 1990. He was awarded in 2004 the Humboldt Prize and in 2011 the Italian National Prize Presidente della Repubblica of the Lincei National Academy. In 2013 he was elected a Fellow of the American Mathematical Society and in 2019 a member of the Academia Europaea.

== Selected publications ==
=== Scientific ===
- Doplicher, Sergio; Haag, Rudolf; Roberts, John E. (1971). "Local observables and particle statistics. 1". Communications in Mathematical Physics. 23 (3): 199–230. Bibcode:1971CMaPh..23..199D. doi:10.1007/BF01877742. S2CID 189833852.
- Doplicher, Sergio; Haag, Rudolf; Roberts, John E. (1974). "Local observables and particle statistics. 2". Communications in Mathematical Physics. 35 (1): 49–85. Bibcode:1974CMaPh..35...49D. doi:10.1007/BF01646454. S2CID 73627903.
- Dell'Antonio, Gianfausto; Doplicher, Sergio; Jona-Lasinio, Giovanni, eds. (1978). Mathematical Problems in Theoretical Physics, International Conference held in Rome. Lecture Notes in Physics. Vol. 80. Springer-Verlag Berlin Heidelberg. doi:10.1007/3-540-08853-9. ISBN 978-3-540-08853-0.
- Doplicher, Sergio; Roberts, John E. (1989). "A new duality theory for compact groups" (PDF). Inventiones Mathematicae. 98: 157–218. Bibcode:1989InMat..98..157D. doi:10.1007/BF01388849. S2CID 120280418.
- Doplicher, Sergio; Roberts, John E. (1990). "Why there is a field algebra with a compact gauge group describing the superselection structure in particle physics". Communications in Mathematical Physics. 131 (1): 51–107. Bibcode:1990CMaPh.131...51D. doi:10.1007/BF02097680. S2CID 121071316.
- Doplicher, Sergio; Fredenhagen, Klaus; Roberts, John E (1994). "Space-time quantization induced by classical gravity". Physics Letters B. 331 (1–2): 39–44. Bibcode:1994PhLB..331...39D. doi:10.1016/0370-2693(94)90940-7.
- Doplicher, Sergio; Fredenhagen, Klaus; Roberts, John E (1995). "The Quantum structure of space-time at the Planck scale and quantum fields". Communications in Mathematical Physics. 172 (1): 187–220. arXiv:hep-th/0303037. Bibcode:1995CMaPh.172..187D. doi:10.1007/BF02104515. S2CID 16206928.
- Connes, Alain; et al. (2004). Doplicher, Sergio; Longo, Roberto (eds.). Noncommutative Geometry, CIME Summer School Lectures held in Martina Franca, Italy. Lecture Notes in Mathematics. Vol. 1831. Springer-Verlag Berlin Heidelberg. doi:10.1007/b94118. ISBN 978-3-540-20357-5.

=== Others ===
- Doplicher, Sergio; Ferro-Luzzi, Fausta (2011). Il De Rerum Natura di Giorgione, il teatro di Giovanni Bellini e lo sguardo della Gioconda (in Italian). Rome: Aracne. ISBN 978-8854841864.
- Doplicher, Sergio (2014). O sol che sani ogne vista turbata, Note sulla Ragione nella Divina Commedia (in Italian). Rome: Edicampus. ISBN 978-8897591146.
- Doplicher, Sergio (2018). Mondo quantistico e Umanesimo (in Italian). Rome: Carocci editore. ISBN 9788843093991.

== See also ==
- Algebraic quantum field theory
- Dagger compact category
- Gauge group
- Local quantum physics
- Noncommutative quantum field theory
- Quantum field theory
- Quantum gravity
- Quantum spacetime
- Superselection
