= Bert Schroer =

German physicist

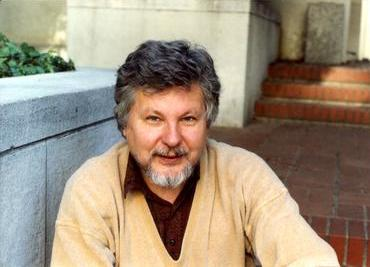
Bert Schroer

Bert Schroer (born November 10, 1933, in Gelsenkirchen, Germany) is a German mathematical physicist, now a visiting professor in Rio de Janeiro and an emeritus professor in Berlin, who is known for his work on algebraic quantum field theory, braid groups, infraparticles, and other issues related to quantum field theory.

He studied physics at the University of Hamburg from 1953 to 1958 and received his PhD there (supervisor Harry Lehmann) in 1963 on the topic of „Theory of Infraparticles“. From 1959 to 1961 he was a research associate at the University of Illinois and 1963–1964 at the Institute for Advances Studies, Princeton. He was associate professor at the University of Pittsburgh (1964–1970) and Full Professor at the Free University of Berlin (1970–1999). He held visiting positions at USP, São Paulo, Brazil (1971/72), at CERN, Geneva, Switzerland (1976/77), and at the Pontifical Catholic University (PUC) in Rio de Janeiro, Brazil (1979/80). Furthermore, he was a visiting professor at CERN (1985/1986) and at the Math. Dept. of UC Berkeley (1992). Since 1999 he is emeritus professor at the Institute for Theoretical Physics at the Freie Universität Berlin and visiting professor at the Centro Brasileiro de Pesquisas Físicas (CBPF), Rio de Janeiro, Brazil.

== Contributions to Physics ==
Schroer contributed to mathematical quantum field theory within Rudolf Haag's „Local Quantum Physics“ approach in terms of operator algebras („algebraic quantum field theory“).

His exact solution of a two-dimensional model introduced the notion of „infraparticles“ with a sharp lower bound of the spectrum of the mass operator but no sharp eigenvalue, due to an inherent „photon cloud“. It preceded the exiomatic theory of interacting charged particles which must be infraparticles whenever they satisfy a Gauss Law.

He advocated the braiding of two-dimensional conformal models as a low-dimensional instance of the DHR theory of superselection sectors and statistics.

Schroer applied algebraic quantum field theory in order to explore, e.g., connections with the Holographic principle, and an entropy-area formula analogous to Bekenstein's black hole entropy.

Emphasizing the conceptual foundations of quantum field theory over formal recipes, Schroer reconsidered the notion of localization as an algebraic feature, connected with unitary Poincaré symmetry via Tomita-Takesaki theory. This led to the construction of string-localized quantum fields for all particle representations of the Poincaré group, including „infinite spin“ (thus promoting infinite spin particles to candidates for Dark Matter). String-localized massless and massive vector potentials allow to reformulate the Standard Model with renormalizable interactions on the Hilbert space without invoking gauge invariance, ghost fields and spontaneous symmetry breaking.

Schroer is a fierce critic of String theory.
