= Wolfgang Götze =

German theoretical physicist (1937–2021)

- Born: 11 July 1937; Fürstenwalde, Germany
- Died: 20 October 2021 (aged 84)
- Education: Humboldt University of Berlin, Free University of Berlin
- Known for: Mode-coupling theory
- Awards: Max Planck Medal (2006); Tomassoni award (2006)
- Scientific career
- Fields: Theoretical physics, condensed matter physics, fluid dynamics
- Workplaces: Technical University of Munich
- Notable students: Annette Zippelius, Sergej Flach, Wolfgang Ketterle

Wolfgang Götze (born 11 July 1937 – 20 October 2021) was a German theoretical physicist.

He began his physics education at Humboldt University of Berlin and the Free University of Berlin, after which he obtained his doctorate at the Technical University of Munich in 1963. After temporary positions at the University of Illinois Urbana-Champaign and the Steklov Institute of Mathematics, in 1970 Götze accepted a chair for theoretical physics at the Technical University of Munich. There he did research on various problems of condensed matter physics as well as fluid dynamics.

He is especially well known for his development of a mode-coupling theory that describes the microscopic dynamics of viscous liquids. When the theory was introduced in the 1980s, it was originally supposed to describe the glass transition. While it provides an incomplete description there, it soon became clear that the theory rather applies to liquids of moderate to low viscosity. In particular, it has been used to accurately model the behavior of supercooled fluids, where the theory has been thoroughly confirmed by experiments and simulations.

After his retirement in 2004 he was nominated TUM Emeritus of Excellence. For his contributions to the theory of condensed matter, especially to mode-coupling theory, Götze received in 2006 the Max Planck Medal of the Deutschen Physikalischen Gesellschaft. In addition, for this theory as well as his whole research work, he won in 2006 the Tomassoni award.
