= IR/UV mixing =

Interrelations between UV and IR physics

In theoretical physics, it is usually possible to organize physical phenomena according to the energy scale or distance scale. The theory of renormalization group is based on this paradigm. The short-distance, ultraviolet (UV) physics does not directly affect qualitative features of the long-distance, infrared (IR) physics, and vice versa.

This separation of scales holds in quantum field theory. However, in its generalizations such as noncommutative field theory and quantum gravity—string theory in particular—it is expected that interrelations between UV and IR physics start to emerge. In many cases, these interrelations, UV/IR mixing, may be demonstrated explicitly.

== See also ==
- Hierarchy problem
- Cutoff
