= Noncommutative quantum field theory =

Quantum field theory using noncommutative mathematics

In mathematical physics, noncommutative quantum field theory (or quantum field theory on noncommutative spacetime) is an application of noncommutative mathematics to the spacetime of quantum field theory that is an outgrowth of noncommutative geometry and index theory in which the coordinate functions are noncommutative. One commonly studied version of such theories has the "canonical" commutation relation:

$$[x^{\mu}, x^{\nu}]=i \theta^{\mu \nu} \,\!$$

where $x^{\mu}$ and $x^{\nu}$ are the hermitian generators of a noncommutative C*-algebra of "functions on spacetime". That means that (with any given set of axes), it is impossible to accurately measure the position of a particle with respect to more than one axis. In fact, this leads to an uncertainty relation for the coordinates analogous to the Heisenberg uncertainty principle.

Various lower limits have been claimed for the noncommutative scale, (i.e. how accurately positions can be measured) but there is currently no experimental evidence in favour of such a theory or grounds for ruling them out.

One of the novel features of noncommutative field theories is the UV/IR mixing phenomenon in which the physics at high energies affects the physics at low energies which does not occur in quantum field theories in which the coordinates commute. Other features include violation of Lorentz invariance due to the preferred direction of noncommutativity. Relativistic invariance can however be retained in the sense of twisted Poincaré invariance of the theory. The causality condition is modified from that of the commutative theories.

== History and motivation ==
Heisenberg was the first to suggest extending noncommutativity to the coordinates as a possible way of removing the infinite quantities appearing in field theories before the renormalization procedure was developed and had gained acceptance. The first paper on the subject was published in 1947 by Hartland Snyder. The success of the renormalization method resulted in little attention being paid to the subject for some time. In the 1980s, mathematicians, most notably Alain Connes, developed noncommutative geometry. Among other things, this work generalized the notion of differential structure to a noncommutative setting. This led to an operator algebraic description of noncommutative space-times, with the problem that it classically corresponds to a manifold with positively defined metric tensor, so that there is no description of (noncommutative) causality in this approach. However it also led to the development of a Yang–Mills theory on a noncommutative torus.

The particle physics community became interested in the noncommutative approach because of a paper by Nathan Seiberg and Edward Witten. They argued in the context of string theory that the coordinate functions of the endpoints of open strings constrained to a D-brane in the presence of a constant Neveu–Schwarz B-field—equivalent to a constant magnetic field on the brane—would satisfy the noncommutative algebra set out above. The implication is that a quantum field theory on noncommutative spacetime can be interpreted as a low energy limit of the theory of open strings.

Two papers, one by Sergio Doplicher, Klaus Fredenhagen and John Roberts and the other by D. V. Ahluwalia, set out another motivation for the possible noncommutativity of space-time. The arguments go as follows: According to general relativity, when the energy density grows sufficiently large, a black hole is formed. On the other hand, according to the Heisenberg uncertainty principle, a measurement of a space-time separation causes an uncertainty in momentum inversely proportional to the extent of the separation. Thus energy whose scale corresponds to the uncertainty in momentum is localized in the system within a region corresponding to the uncertainty in position. When the separation is small enough, the Schwarzschild radius of the system is reached and a black hole is formed, which prevents any information from escaping the system. Thus there is a lower bound for the measurement of length. A sufficient condition for preventing gravitational collapse can be expressed as an uncertainty relation for the coordinates. This relation can in turn be derived from a commutation relation for the coordinates.

It is worth stressing that, differently from other approaches, in particular those relying upon Connes' ideas, here the noncommutative spacetime is a proper spacetime, i.e. it extends the idea of a four-dimensional pseudo-Riemannian manifold. On the other hand, differently from Connes' noncommutative geometry, the proposed model turns out to be coordinate-dependent from scratch. In Doplicher Fredenhagen Roberts' paper noncommutativity of coordinates concerns all four spacetime coordinates and not only spatial ones.

== See also ==
- Moyal product
- Noncommutative standard model
- Wigner–Weyl transform
