= Weidenmüller =

Weidenmüller is a German surname. Notable people with the surname include:

- Hans-Arwed Weidenmüller (born 1933), German theoretical physicist
- Horst Weidenmüller (1964–2025), German music executive producer and entrepreneur
