= Detlev Buchholz =

German physicist

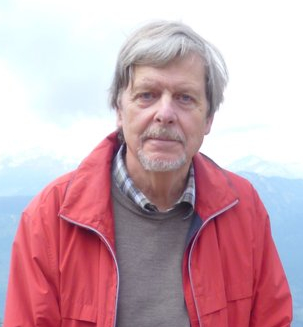
- Born: 31 May 1944 (age 82): Danzig, Germany; (today Gdańsk, Poland)
- Education: University of Hannover; University of Hamburg
- Awards: Max Planck medal (2008)
- Scientific career
- Fields: Physics
- Workplaces: University of Hamburg; University of Pennsylvania; CERN; University of California, Berkeley; University of Göttingen
- Thesis: Lokale Teilchenstruktur von Zuständen in der Quantenfeldtheorie (1973)
- Doctoral advisor: Rudolf Haag

Detlev Buchholz (born 31 May 1944) is a German theoretical physicist. He investigates quantum field theory, especially in the axiomatic framework of algebraic quantum field theory.

== Biography ==
Buchholz studied physics in Hannover and Hamburg where he acquired his Diplom in 1968. After graduation, he continued his studies in physics in Hamburg. In 1970–1971 he was at the University of Pennsylvania. After receiving his PhD in 1973 under Rudolf Haag he worked at the University of Hamburg and was in 1974–1975 at CERN. From 1975 to 1978 he worked as a research assistant in Hamburg, where he got his habilitation in 1977. In 1978–1979 he had a Max Kade grant at the University of California, Berkeley. In 1979 he was a professor in Hamburg and changed to the University of Göttingen in 1997. He retired in 2010 as professor emeritus.

Buchholz made contributions to relativistic quantum physics and quantum field theory, especially in the area of algebraic quantum field theory. Using the methods of Tomita–Takesaki theory, he obtained the split property from nuclearity conditions, a strong result about the locality of the theory. His contributions include the concept of infraparticles.

== Honors and awards ==
In 1977 Detlev Buchholz won, together with Gert Strobl, the Physics Prize of the German Physical Society (today known as Gustav-Hertz-Preis) and In 1979 the Physics Prize of the Göttingen Academy of Sciences. In 1995 Buchholz received the Japanese-German Research Award of the Japan Society for the Promotion of Science and the Alexander von Humboldt Foundation. In 1998 he was an Invited Speaker at the International Congress of Mathematicians in Berlin. He has been editor-in-chief of the scientific journal Reviews in Mathematical Physics. In 2008 Buchholz was awarded the Max Planck Medal for outstanding contributions to quantum field theory.

== Selected works ==
- Buchholz, Detlev (2008). "Quantenfeldtheorie ohne Felder". Physik Journal (in German). 7 (8/9): 45–50. (Article on Buchholz's receipt of the Planck medal.)
- Buchholz, Detlev (July 2000). "Algebraic Quantum Field Theory: A Status Report". 13th International Congress in Mathematical Physics (ICMP 2000). London. pp. 1–18. arXiv:math-ph/0011044.
- Buchholz, Detlev; Haag, Rudolf (2000). "The Quest for understanding in relativistic quantum physics". Journal of Mathematical Physics. 41 (6): 3674–3697. arXiv:hep-th/9910243. Bibcode:2000JMP....41.3674B. doi:10.1063/1.533324. S2CID 2088998.
- Buchholz, Detlev (2000). "Current trends in axiomatic quantum field theory". Quantum Field Theory. Lecture Notes in Physics. Vol. 558. pp. 43–64. arXiv:hep-th/9811233. Bibcode:2000LNP...558...43B. doi:10.1007/3-540-44482-3_4. ISBN 978-3-540-67972-1. S2CID 5052535.

== See also ==
- Algebraic quantum field theory
- Infraparticle
- Local quantum physics
- Quantum field theory
