= Huzihiro Araki =

Japanese mathematician (1932–2022)

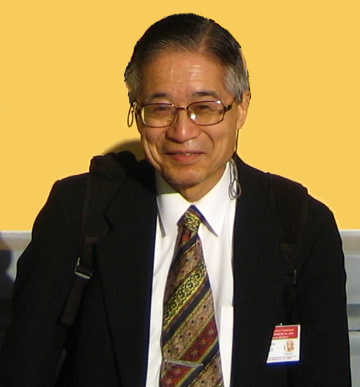
- Born: 28 July 1932; Tokyo, Japan
- Died: 16 December 2022 (aged 90)
- Education: University of Kyoto; Princeton University
- Awards: Henri Poincaré Prize (2003)
- Scientific career
- Fields: Physics; Mathematics
- Workplaces: University of Kyoto
- Thesis: Hamiltonian Formalism and Canonical Commutation Relations in Quantum Field Theory (1960)
- Doctoral advisors: Rudolf Haag; Arthur Wightman

Huzihiro Araki (荒木 不二洋, Araki Fujihiro; 28 July 1932 – 16 December 2022) was a Japanese mathematical physicist and mathematician who worked on the foundations of quantum field theory, on quantum statistical mechanics, and on the theory of operator algebras.

== Biography ==
Araki is the son of the University of Kyoto physics professor Gentarō Araki, with whom he studied and with whom in 1954 he published his first physics paper. He earned his diploma under Hideki Yukawa and in 1960 he attained his doctorate at Princeton University with thesis advisors Rudolf Haag and Arthur Wightman. He was a professor at the University of Kyoto starting in 1966, and became the director of the Research Institute for Mathematical Sciences (RIMS).

Araki died on 16 December 2022.

== Research ==
Araki worked on axiomatic quantum field theory, statistical mechanics, and in particular on applications of operator algebras like von Neumann algebras and C*-algebras. At the beginning of the 1960s, in Princeton, he made important contributions to local quantum physics and to the scattering theories of Haag and David Ruelle. He also supplied important contributions in the mathematical theory of operator algebras, classifying the type-III factors of von Neumann algebras. Araki originated the concept of relative entropy of states of von Neumann algebras. In the 1970s he showed the equivalence in quantum thermodynamics of, on the one hand, the KMS condition (named after Ryogo Kubo, Paul C. Martin, and Julian Schwinger) for the characterization of quantum mechanical states in thermodynamic equilibrium with, on the other hand, the variational principle for quantum mechanical spin systems on lattices. With Yanase he worked on the foundations of quantum mechanics, i.e. the Wigner-Araki-Yanase theorem, which describes restrictions that conservation laws impose upon the physical measuring process. Stated in more precise terms, they proved that an exact measurement of an operator, which additively replaces the operator with a conserved size, is impossible. However, Yanase did prove that the uncertainty of the measurement can be made arbitrarily small, provided that the measuring apparatus is sufficiently large.

== Honors and awards ==
Huzihiro Araki was an invited speaker at the International Congress of Mathematicians in 1970 in Nice and in 1978 in Helsinki. He was the second president of the International Association of Mathematical Physics, during the period 1979–1981. In 2003 he received, together with Oded Schramm and Elliott Lieb, the Henri Poincaré Prize. In 1990 he was the chief organizer of the International Congress of Mathematicians in Kyoto. He was editor of the scientific journal Communications in Mathematical Physics and founder of Reviews in Mathematical Physics. In 2012 he became a fellow of the American Mathematical Society.

== Selected works ==
- Araki, Huzihiro (1999). Mathematical theory of quantum fields. Vol. 101. Oxford University Press on Demand. ISBN 978-0199566402.
- Araki, Huzihiro; Lieb, Elliott H. (1970). "Entropy inequalities". Communications in Mathematical Physics. 18 (2): 160–170. Bibcode:1970CMaPh..18..160A. doi:10.1007/BF01646092. S2CID 189832417.
- Araki, Huzihiro; Woods, E. J. (1963). "Representations of the canonical commutation relations describing a nonrelativistic infinite free Bose gas". Journal of Mathematical Physics. 4 (5): 637–662. Bibcode:1963JMP.....4..637A. doi:10.1063/1.1704002.
- Araki, Huzihiro; Woods, E. J. (1968). "A classification of factors". Publications of the Research Institute for Mathematical Sciences, Kyoto University. Ser. A. 4 (1): 51–130. doi:10.2977/prims/1195195263.
- Araki, Huzihiro (1976). "Relative Entropy of States of Von Neumann Algebras". Publications of the Research Institute for Mathematical Sciences: 809–833.
- Araki, Huzihiro; Yanase, Mutsuo M. (1960). "Measurement of Quantum Mechanical Operators". Physical Review. 120 (2): 622–626. Bibcode:1960PhRv..120..622A. doi:10.1103/PhysRev.120.622.
- Araki, Huzihiro; Hepp, Klaus; Ruelle, David (1962). "On the asymptotic behaviour of Wightman functions in space-like directions". Helvetica Physica Acta. 35 (3): 164–174. doi:10.5169/seals-113273.
- Araki, Huzihiro (1974). "On the equivalence of the KMS condition and the variational principle for quantum lattice systems". Communications in Mathematical Physics. 38 (1): 1–10. Bibcode:1974CMaPh..38....1A. doi:10.1007/BF01651545. S2CID 73547157.

== See also ==
- Araki–Sucher correction
- Algebraic quantum field theory
- C*-algebra
- KMS state
- Local quantum physics
- Quantum field theory
- Quantum thermodynamics
- Von Neumann algebra
