= Araki–Sucher correction =

Mathematical formula in physics

In atomic, molecular and optical physics, the Araki–Sucher correction is a leading-order correction to the energy levels of atoms and molecules due to effects of quantum electrodynamics (QED). It is named after Huzihiro Araki and Joseph Sucher, who first calculated it for the helium atom in 1957. The method is based on a perturbative expansion of the energy in the Bethe–Salpeter equation, and have since been used to calculate corrections for atoms other than helium (e.g. beryllium and lithium), and for systems with more than two electrons. The correction typically involves the fine-structure constant $\alpha$ and may sometimes include terms of third order and higher (i.e. $\sim \alpha^3$).
