= Martin Zirnbauer =

German physicist (born 1958)

Martin R. Zirnbauer (born 25 April 1958 in Moosburg an der Isar) is a professor of theoretical physics at the University of Cologne.

Zirnbauer studied at the Technical University of Munich and Oxford University, where he earned his PhD in 1982. In 1987 he was appointed at age 29 to Cologne. In 1996 he acquired his professorial chair. Among his foreign research sabbaticals, he visited the California Institute of Technology in Pasadena. His research specialty is the mathematical physics of mesoscopic systems.

With Alexander Altland, he is known for the Altland–Zirbauern classification for random matrices published in 1997, later used for the construction of the periodic table of topological insulators and topological superconductors.

== Awards ==
In 2009 for his research he received the prestigious Leibniz prize from the Deutsche Forschungsgemeinschaft, which granted him over a period of seven years 2.5 million €. In 2012 he was awarded the Max Planck medal.
