= Max Planck Medal =

Physics award

The inaugural award: Max Planck (left) presents Albert Einstein (right) with the Max Planck medal of the German Physical Society, 28 June 1929, in Berlin, Germany.

The Max Planck Medal is the highest award of the German Physical Society (Deutsche Physikalische Gesellschaft), the world's largest organization of physicists, for extraordinary achievements in theoretical physics. The prize has been awarded annually since 1929, with few exceptions, and usually to a single person. The winner is awarded with a gold medal and hand-written parchment.

In 1943 it was not possible to manufacture the gold medal because the Berlin foundry was hit by a bomb. The board of directors of the German Physical Society decided to manufacture the medals in a substitute metal and to deliver the gold medals later.

The highest award of the German Physical Society for outstanding results in experimental physics is the Stern–Gerlach Medal.

== List of recipients ==
- 2026 Kurt Kremer
- 2025 Reinhard F. Werner
- 2024 Erwin Frey
- 2023 Rashid A. Sunyaev
- 2022 Annette Zippelius
- 2021 Alexander Markovich Polyakov
- 2020 Andrzej Buras
- 2019 Detlef Lohse
- 2018 Juan Ignacio Cirac
- 2017 Herbert Spohn
- 2016 Herbert Wagner
- 2015 Viatcheslav Mukhanov
- 2014 David Ruelle
- 2013 Werner Nahm
- 2012 Martin Zirnbauer
- 2011 Giorgio Parisi
- 2010 Dieter Vollhardt
- 2009 Robert Graham
- 2008 Detlev Buchholz
- 2007 Joel Lebowitz
- 2006 Wolfgang Götze
- 2005 Peter Zoller
- 2004 Klaus Hepp
- 2003 Martin Gutzwiller
- 2002 Jürgen Ehlers
- 2001 Jürg Fröhlich
- 2000 Martin Lüscher
- 1999 Pierre Hohenberg
- 1998 Raymond Stora
- 1997 Gerald E. Brown
- 1996 Ludvig Faddeev
- 1995 Siegfried Grossmann
- 1994 Hans-Jürgen Borchers
- 1993 Kurt Binder
- 1992 Elliott H. Lieb
- 1991 Wolfhart Zimmermann
- 1990 Hermann Haken
- 1989 Bruno Zumino
- 1988 Valentine Bargmann
- 1987 Julius Wess
- 1986 Franz Wegner
- 1985 Yoichiro Nambu
- 1984 Res Jost
- 1983 Nicholas Kemmer
- 1982 Hans-Arwed Weidenmüller
- 1981 Kurt Symanzik
- 1980 not awarded
- 1979 Markus Fierz
- 1978 Paul Peter Ewald
- 1977 Walter Thirring
- 1976 Ernst Stueckelberg
- 1975 Gregor Wentzel
- 1974 Léon Van Hove
- 1973 Nikolay Bogolyubov
- 1972 Herbert Fröhlich
- 1971 not awarded
- 1970 Rudolf Haag
- 1969 Freeman Dyson
- 1968 Walter Heitler
- 1967 Harry Lehmann
- 1966 Gerhart Lüders
- 1965 not awarded
- 1964 Samuel Goudsmit and George Uhlenbeck
- 1963 Rudolf Peierls
- 1962 Ralph Kronig
- 1961 Eugene Wigner
- 1960 Lev Landau
- 1959 Oskar Klein
- 1958 Wolfgang Pauli
- 1957 Carl Friedrich von Weizsäcker
- 1956 Victor Weisskopf
- 1955 Hans Bethe
- 1954 Enrico Fermi
- 1953 Walther Bothe
- 1952 Paul Dirac
- 1951 James Franck and Gustav Hertz
- 1950 Peter Debye
- 1949 Lise Meitner and Otto Hahn
- 1948 Max Born
- 1945–1947 not awarded
- 1944 Walther Kossel
- 1943 Friedrich Hund
- 1942 Pascual Jordan
- 1939–1941 not awarded
- 1938 Louis de Broglie
- 1937 Erwin Schrödinger
- 1934–1936 not awarded
- 1933 Werner Heisenberg
- 1932 Max von Laue
- 1931 Arnold Sommerfeld
- 1930 Niels Bohr
- 1929 Max Planck and Albert Einstein

== See also ==
- List of physics awards
- Max Planck
