= Wigner–Araki–Yanase theorem =

The Wigner–Araki–Yanase theorem, also known as the WAY theorem, is a result in quantum physics establishing that the presence of a conservation law limits the accuracy with which observables that fail to commute with the conserved quantity can be measured. It is named for the physicists Eugene Wigner, Huzihiro Araki and Mutsuo Yanase.

The theorem can be illustrated with a particle coupled to a measuring apparatus. If the position operator of the particle is $q$ and its momentum operator is $p$, and if the position and momentum of the apparatus are $Q$ and $P$ respectively, assuming that the total momentum $p + P$ is conserved implies that, in a suitably quantified sense, the particle's position itself cannot be measured. The measurable quantity is its position relative to the measuring apparatus, represented by the operator $q - Q$. The Wigner–Araki–Yanase theorem generalizes this to the case of two arbitrary observables $A$ and $B$ for the system and an observable $C$ for the apparatus, satisfying the condition that $B + C$ is conserved.

Mikko Tukiainen gave a generalized version of the WAY theorem, which makes no use of conservation laws, but uses quantum incompatibility instead.

Yui Kuramochi and Hiroyasu Tajima proved a generalized form of the theorem for possibly unbounded and continuous conserved observables.
