= Quantum field theory in curved spacetime =

Extension of quantum field theory to curved spacetime

In theoretical physics, quantum field theory in curved spacetime (QFTCS) is an extension of quantum field theory from Minkowski spacetime to a general curved spacetime. This theory uses a semi-classical approach; it treats spacetime as a fixed, classical background, while giving a quantum-mechanical description of the matter and energy propagating through that spacetime. A general prediction of this theory is that particles can be created by time-dependent gravitational fields (multigraviton pair production), or by time-independent gravitational fields that contain horizons. The most famous example of the latter is the phenomenon of Hawking radiation emitted by black holes.

== Overview ==
Ordinary quantum field theories, which form the basis of Standard Model, are defined in flat Minkowski space, which is an excellent approximation when it comes to describing the behavior of microscopic particles in weak gravitational fields like those found on Earth. In order to describe situations in which gravity is strong enough to influence (quantum) matter, yet not strong enough to require quantization itself, physicists have formulated quantum field theories in curved spacetime. These theories rely on general relativity to describe a curved background spacetime, and define a generalized quantum field theory to describe the behavior of quantum matter within that spacetime.

For non-zero cosmological constants, on curved spacetimes quantum fields lose their interpretation as asymptotic particles. Only in certain situations, such as in asymptotically flat spacetimes (zero cosmological curvature), can the notion of incoming and outgoing particle be recovered, thus enabling one to define an S-matrix. Even then, as in flat spacetime, the asymptotic particle interpretation depends on the observer (i.e., different observers may measure different numbers of asymptotic particles on a given spacetime).

Another observation is that unless the background metric tensor has a global timelike Killing vector, there is no way to define a vacuum or ground state canonically. The concept of a vacuum is not invariant under diffeomorphisms. This is because a mode decomposition of a field into positive and negative frequency modes is not invariant under diffeomorphisms. If $t'(t)$ is a diffeomorphism, then, in general, the Fourier transform of $e^{i k t'(t)}$ will contain negative frequencies even if $k > 0$. Creation operators correspond to positive frequencies, while annihilation operators correspond to negative frequencies. This is why a state that looks like a vacuum to one observer cannot look like a vacuum state to another observer; it could even appear as a heat bath under suitable hypotheses.

Since the end of the 1980s, the local quantum field theory approach due to Rudolf Haag and Daniel Kastler has been implemented in order to include an algebraic version of quantum field theory in curved spacetime. Indeed, the viewpoint of local quantum physics is suitable to generalize the renormalization procedure to the theory of quantum fields developed on curved backgrounds. Several rigorous results concerning QFT in the presence of a black hole have been obtained. In particular the algebraic approach allows one to deal with the problems mentioned above arising from the absence of a preferred reference vacuum state, the absence of a natural notion of particle and the appearance of unitarily inequivalent representations of the algebra of observables.

== Applications ==
Using perturbation theory in quantum field theory in curved spacetime geometry is known as the semiclassical approach to quantum gravity. This approach studies the interaction of quantum fields in a fixed classical spacetime and among other things predicts the creation of particles by time-varying spacetimes and Hawking radiation. The latter can be understood as a manifestation of the Unruh effect where an accelerating observer observes black-body radiation. Other predictions of quantum fields in curved spaces include, for example, the radiation emitted by a particle moving along a geodesic and the interaction of Hawking radiation with particles outside black holes.

This formalism is also used to predict the primordial density perturbation spectrum arising in different models of cosmic inflation. These predictions are calculated using the Bunch–Davies vacuum or modifications thereto.

== Approximation to quantum gravity ==
The theory of quantum field theory in curved spacetime may be considered as an intermediate step towards quantum gravity. QFT in curved spacetime is expected to be a viable approximation to the theory of quantum gravity when spacetime curvature is not significant on the Planck scale. Nonetheless, the fact that the true theory of quantum gravity remains unknown means that the precise criteria for when QFT on curved spacetime is a good approximation are also unknown.

Gravity is not renormalizable in QFT, so merely formulating QFT in curved spacetime is not a true theory of quantum gravity.

== See also ==
- General relativity
- History of quantum field theory
- Local quantum field theory
- Statistical field theory
- Topological quantum field theory
- Quantum geometry
- Quantum spacetime
