= Robert Graham (physicist) =

German theoretical physicist

Robert Graham (born 11 February 1942, Berlin) is a German theoretical physicist.

== Biography ==
Graham attended the Karls-Gymnasium in Stuttgart and studied at the University of Stuttgart, where in 1967 he earned under Hermann Haken his physics Diplom (quantum fluctuations of the optical parametric oscillator) and in 1969 his PhD (Lichtausbreitung in laseraktiven fluktuierenden Medien, "Light Propagation in Laser-active Fluctuating Media"). Continuing this work, he applied the theory of cooperative systems publicized by Haken as "Synergetik" (Synergetics) in quantum optics. As a post-doc, he was a guest scientist at New York University and, after his Habilitation in 1971, scientific advisor and professor at the University of Stuttgart. From 1975 he was a professor at the Universität Duisburg-Essen, where he is now retired as professor emeritus. He was there also dean and prorector for research.

He worked on extremely diverse areas of quantum theoretical statistical mechanics, apart from laser theory also in the 1990s with the theory of Bose–Einstein condensate. In 2009 he received the Max Planck medal, the highest honor of the DPG in theoretical physics for his contributions in the areas of quantum optics, the statistical mechanics of open stationary systems outside thermodynamic equilibrium, quantum fluids and quantum gases as well as quantum chaos (according to the Laudatio of the Max Planck medal 2009) and his contributions to quantum aspects of cosmology and gravitation.

== Selected works ==
- Von der Laserschwelle zum Quantenphasenübergang - Photonen und Atome als Quantengase im Fließgleichgewicht. In: Physik Journal. 2009, No. 8/9 (prize acceptance speech for the Max Planck medal)
- Statistical theory of instabilities in stationary nonequilibrium systems with applications to lasers and nonlinear optics (= Springer Tracts in Modern Physics, Vol. 66). 1973 (Habilitation 1971)
- Macroscopic potentials, bifurcations and noise in dissipative systems. In: F. Moss und P.V.E. McClintock (eds.): Noise in nonlinear dynamical systems. Band 1, Cambridge University Press 1989, pages 225–278
