= Henri Kastler =

French philatelist (1863-1957)

Henri Kastler (13 May 1863 – 13 November 1957) was a French philatelist who was added to the Roll of Distinguished Philatelists in 1947. Kastler was the first president of the Academy of Philately.
