= Roberto Longo (mathematician) =

Italian mathematician

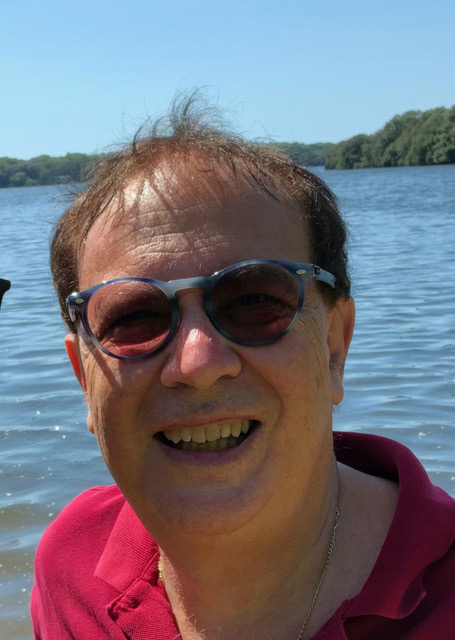
- Born: 9 May 1953; Rome, Italy
- Education: Sapienza University of Rome
- Awards: Humboldt Prize (2016); Medaglia dei XL (2021)
- Scientific career
- Fields: Mathematics
- Workplaces: University of Pennsylvania; University of California, Berkeley; University of Rome Tor Vergata
- Thesis: Tomita-Takesaki modular structure for AFD von Neumann algebras (1975)
- Academic advisors: Sergio Doplicher

Roberto Longo (born 9 May 1953) is an Italian mathematician, specializing in operator algebras and quantum field theory.

== Education and career ==
Roberto Longo graduated in Mathematics at the Sapienza University of Rome in 1975 under the supervision of the mathematical physicist Sergio Doplicher. From 1975 to 1977 Longo was a predoctoral fellow of the Consiglio Nazionale delle Ricerche and later assistant professor at the Sapienza University of Rome, where he became an associate professor in 1980. In 1987, he was nominated full professor of functional analysis at the University of Rome Tor Vergata, and since 2010, he has been the director of the Center for Mathematics and Theoretical Physics in Rome.

Between 1978 and 1979, he was visiting scholar at the University of Pennsylvania and the University of California, Berkeley. He has been a visiting professor in numerous research centers, including the CNRS in Marseille, the Mathematical Sciences Research Institute in Berkeley, California, the Harvard University, MIT, and the University of Göttingen.

Since 2024, Roberto Longo has been an Emeritus Professor at the University of Rome Tor Vergata.

Longo is an expert in the theory of operator algebras and its applications to quantum field theory. His work influenced the structural analysis of quantum field theory, especially of conformal field theory, and opened up to new developments in model-building methods of interest in local quantum physics.

Roberto Longo is known in particular for his work with Sergio Doplicher on split inclusions of von Neumann algebras and for having solved, independently with Sorin Popa, the Stone-Weierstrass conjecture for factorial states. He also found the relationship between the statistical dimension and the Jones index. In a work with Yasuyuki Kawahigashi, Longo classified the discrete series of conformal chiral networks of von Neumann algebras. Together with Vincenzo Morinelli and Karl-Henning Rehren, he also showed that particles with infinite spin cannot appear in a local theory. His most recent works concern entropy and information for infinite quantum systems.

== Honours and awards ==
In 1994 Longo was an invited speaker at the International Congress of Mathematicians in Zurich. He was invited speaker at the International Congress on Mathematical Physics in 1981 in Berlin, in 1988 in Swansea, in 1994 in Paris, and in 2003 in Lisbon. In 2004 he was Andrejewski Lecturer in Göttingen. He was a plenary speaker at the International Congress of Mathematicians in 2009 in Prague and at Strings 2018 in Okinawa.

In 2013 he was elected a Fellow of the American Mathematical Society and in 2021 a member of the Academia Europaea. He was awarded in 2016 the Humboldt Research Award and in 2021 the XL medal from the Accademia Nazionale delle Scienze detta dei XL for his in-depth and innovative research in operator algebras and in conformal field theory. In 2013 the conference Mathematics and Quantum Physics at the Lincei National Academy was dedicated to him on the occasion of his 60th birthday. In 2008 and in 2015 he received two Advanced Grants from the European Research Council. In 2018 he was member of the sectional panel Mathematical Physics of the International Congress of Mathematicians in Rio de Janeiro.

== Selected publications ==
- Hislop, Peter D.; Longo, Roberto (1982). "Modular structure of the local algebras associated with the free massless scalar field theory". Communications in Mathematical Physics. 84 (1): 71–85. Bibcode:1982CMaPh..84...71H. doi:10.1007/BF01208372. S2CID 119856852.
- Doplicher, S.; Longo, R. (1984). "Standard and split inclusions of von Neumann algebras". Inventiones Mathematicae. 75 (3): 493–536. Bibcode:1984InMat..75..493D. doi:10.1007/BF01388641. hdl:2108/53288. ISSN 0020-9910. S2CID 121819323.
- Longo, Roberto (1984). "Solution of the factorial Stone-Weierstrass conjecture. An application of the theory of standard split W*-inclusions". Inventiones Mathematicae. 76 (1): 145–155. Bibcode:1984InMat..76..145L. doi:10.1007/BF01388497. S2CID 122775835.
- Longo, Roberto (1989). "Index of subfactors and statistics of quantum fields. I". Communications in Mathematical Physics. 126 (2): 217–247. Bibcode:1989CMaPh.126..217L. doi:10.1007/BF02125124. hdl:2108/53292. S2CID 122420613.
- Longo, Roberto (1994). "A duality for Hopf algebras and for subfactors. I". Communications in Mathematical Physics. 159 (1): 133–150. Bibcode:1994CMaPh.159..133L. doi:10.1007/BF02100488. hdl:2108/54271. ISSN 0010-3616. S2CID 123347247.
- Guido, Daniele; Longo, Roberto (1996). "The conformal spin and statistics theorem". Communications in Mathematical Physics. 181 (1): 11–35. arXiv:hep-th/9505059. Bibcode:1996CMaPh.181...11G. doi:10.1007/BF02101672. S2CID 17663903.
- Longo, Roberto; Roberts, John E. (1997). "A Theory of Dimension". K-Theory. 11 (2): 103–159. arXiv:funct-an/9604008. Bibcode:1996funct.an..4008L. doi:10.1023/A:1007714415067. S2CID 119581477.
- Kawahigashi, Yasuyuki; Longo, Roberto; Müger, Michael (2001). "Multi-Interval Subfactors and Modularity of Representations in Conformal Field Theory". Communications in Mathematical Physics. 219 (3): 631–669. arXiv:math/9903104. Bibcode:2001CMaPh.219..631K. doi:10.1007/PL00005565. S2CID 15568392.
- Kawahigashi, Yasuyuki; Longo, Roberto (2004). "Classification of local conformal nets: Case c < 1". Annals of Mathematics. 160 (2): 493–522. arXiv:math-ph/0201015. doi:10.4007/annals.2004.160.493. S2CID 7145642.
- Kac, Victor G.; Longo, Roberto; Xu, Feng (2004). "Solitons in affine and permutation orbifolds". Communications in Mathematical Physics. 253 (3): 723–764. arXiv:math/0312512. doi:10.1007/s00220-004-1160-1. S2CID 14298134.
- Longo, Roberto; Witten, Edward (2011). "An Algebraic Construction of Boundary Quantum Field Theory". Communications in Mathematical Physics. 303 (1): 213–232. arXiv:1004.0616. Bibcode:2011CMaPh.303..213L. doi:10.1007/s00220-010-1133-5. S2CID 115174261.
- Longo, Roberto; Morinelli, Vincenzo; Rehren, Karl-Henning (2016). "Where Infinite Spin Particles Are Localizable". Communications in Mathematical Physics. 345 (2): 587–614. arXiv:1505.01759. Bibcode:2016CMaPh.345..587L. doi:10.1007/s00220-015-2475-9. S2CID 119569712.
- Carpi, Sebastiano; Kawahigashi, Yasuyuki; Longo, Roberto; Weiner, Mihály (2018). "From vertex operator algebras to conformal nets and back". Memoirs of the American Mathematical Society. 254 (1213). arXiv:1503.01260. doi:10.1090/memo/1213. S2CID 119618626.
- Ciolli, Fabio; Longo, Roberto; Ruzzi, Giuseppe (2019). "The information in a wave". Communications in Mathematical Physics. 379 (3): 979–1000. arXiv:1906.01707. Bibcode:2019CMaPh.379..979C. doi:10.1007/s00220-019-03593-3. S2CID 174799030.

== See also ==
- Axiomatic quantum field theory
- Local quantum physics
- Operator algebra
- Quantum field theory
