= Composite gravity =

Class of models of gravitation treating gravitons as composite particles

In theoretical physics, composite gravity refers to models that attempted to derive general relativity in a framework where the graviton is constructed as a composite bound state of more elementary particles, usually fermions. A theorem by Steven Weinberg and Edward Witten shows that this is not possible in Lorentz covariant theories: massless particles with spin greater than one are forbidden. The AdS/CFT correspondence may be viewed as a loophole in their argument. However, in this case not only the graviton is emergent; a whole spacetime dimension is emergent, too.

== See also ==
- Weinberg–Witten theorem
