= Singleton field =

Fields relating to the anti-de Sitter group

A singleton field theory is a quantum field theory that treats massless particles in anti-de Sitter spacetime as pairs of "singletons". Originally introduced by Moshé Flato and Christian Frønsdal, they are based on Paul Dirac's work on the representation theory of the group SO(3,2).

== See also ==
- Preon
