= Annette Zippelius =

German physicist

Annette Zippelius (born 25 June 1949) is a German physicist, Leibniz Prize winner and an emeritus professor from the University of Göttingen known for her research on complex fluids and soft matter. In 1988 she was appointed to the Chair of Theoretical Physics at the University of Göttingen, making her the first woman to be appointed as a professor of C4 physics in Germany. And in 1998, She was awarded the Gottfried Wilhelm Leibniz Prize for the construction of an exact network-model with the functioning proprieties of an associative memory. Most recently, in 2023 she was awarded the University Medal "In Publica Commoda" from the University of Göttingen for her service to the university.

== Career ==
Annette Zippelius studied Physics at the University of Colorado in Boulder, USA. And in 1977, she finished her PhD at the Technical University of Munich. From 1978 to 1980, she was a postdoctoral associate at Harvard University, and from 1980 to 1981 was a postdoctoral associate at Cornell University.

In 1983 she joined the Forschungszentrum Jülich as a researcher.

She is currently an emeritus professor at the University of Göttingen.

== Awards and honors ==
- 1993: Member of the Göttingen Academy of Sciences and Humanities (Akademie der Wissenschaften zu Göttingen).
- 1998: Leibniz Prize of the Deutsche Forschungsgemeinschaft (DFG)
- 2002 – 2006: Member of the Executive Board of the German Physical Society (Deutsche Physikalische Gesellschaft)
- 2005 – 2011: Member of The German Council of Science and Humanities (Wissenschaftsrat)
- 2007 – 2014: Max-Planck Fellow, Max Planck Institute for Dynamics and Self-Organization, Göttingen
- 2008: Elected Fellow of the American Physical Society
- 2022: Max Planck Medal of the German Physical Society
- 2023: Awarded The University Medal "In Publica Commoda" from the University of Göttingen
