= Hans-Arwed Weidenmüller =

German theoretical physicist (born 1933)

Hans-Arwed Weidenmüller (born 26 July 1933 in Dresden) is a German theoretical physicist, who works primarily in the field of nuclear physics.

== Life and work ==
Weidenmüller studied in Bonn and from 1956 to 1957 in Heidelberg under J. Hans D. Jensen, who was his doctoral thesis advisor for his thesis on stripping reactions (Zeitschrift für Physik Bd.150, 1958, 389), in which the nuclei used as projectiles lose nucleons to the nuclei used as targets. He was from 1963 professor for theoretical physics at the University of Heidelberg. From 1968 he worked at the Max Planck Institute for Nuclear Physics and was director there from 1972 until his 2001 retirement.

Weidenmüller is known above all for his work in the theory of nuclear reactions. He examined nuclear reactions in the shell model under inclusion of continuum states and developed a microscopic statistical theory of nuclear reactions; this statistical theory (now known as transport theory) had applications to the interpretation of the particle accelerator experiments with heavy ions as well as on highly excited compound nuclei. He also examined chaotic dynamism in atomic nuclei and nuclear reactions (as well as Bose–Einstein condensates) with the help of the method of random matrices.

== Recognitions and prizes ==
Weidenmüller has an honorary doctorate from the Weizmann Institute (1991) and membership in the Akademie der Naturforscher Leopoldina and in the Heidelberger Akademie der Wissenschaften.

- 1982 - Max Planck Medal
- 1995 - Humboldt/South Africa Award of the University of Johannesburg

== Selected works ==
- Mang, Weidenmüller: "Shell model theory of the nucleus." Annual Review Nuclear Physics Bd.18, 1968, S. 1-26
- Weidenmüller, Claude Mahaux: Shell model approach to nuclear reactions. North Holland, 1969
- Weidenmüller, Wolfgang Nörenberg: Introduction to the theory of heavy ion collisions. Springer 1976, Lecture Notes in Physics
- Weidenmüller: "Transport theories of heavy ion reactions". Progress in Nuclear and Particle Physics, Bd.3, 1980, S.49
- Verbaarschot, Weidenmüller, Zirnbauer: "Grassmann Integrations and stochastic quantum physics." Physics Reports Bd.129, 1985, S.367-438
- Guhr, Müller-Groening, Weidenmüller: "Random Matrix theories in quantum physics: common concepts." Physics Reports, Bd.299, 1998, S.189-425
- Papenbrock, Weidenmüller: "Random matrices and chaos in nuclear spectra." Reviews of Modern Physics, Bd.79, 2007, S.997
- Weidenmüller: "Chaos in Atomkernen." Physik Journal März 2004
- Weidenmüller, Zhang: "Nuclear fission viewed as a diffusion process: case of very large friction." Physical Review C, Bd. 29, 1984, S.879
