= Noncommutative standard model =

In theoretical particle physics, the non-commutative Standard Model (best known as Spectral Standard Model), is a model based on noncommutative geometry that unifies a modified form of general relativity with the Standard Model (extended with right-handed neutrinos).

The model postulates that space-time is the product of a 4-dimensional compact spin manifold $\mathcal{M}$ by a finite space $\mathcal{F}$. The full Lagrangian (in Euclidean signature) of the Standard Model minimally coupled to gravity is obtained as pure gravity over that product space. It is therefore close in spirit to Kaluza–Klein theory but without the problem of massive tower of states.

The parameters of the model live at unification scale and physical predictions are obtained by running the parameters down through renormalization.

It is worth stressing that it is more than a simple reformation of the Standard Model. For example, the scalar sector and the fermions representations are more constrained than in effective field theory.

== Motivation ==
Following ideas from Kaluza–Klein and Albert Einstein, the spectral approach seeks unification by expressing all forces as pure gravity on a space $\mathcal{X}$.

The group of invariance of such a space should combine the group of invariance of general relativity $\text{Diff}(\mathcal{M})$ with $\mathcal{G} = \text{Map}(\mathcal{M}, G)$, the group of maps from $\mathcal{M}$ to the Standard Model gauge group $G=\mathrm{SU}(3) \times \mathrm{SU}(2) \times U(1)$.

$\text{Diff}(\mathcal{M})$ acts on $\mathcal{G}$ by permutations and the full group of symmetries of $\mathcal{X}$ is the semi-direct product: $\text{Diff}(\mathcal{X}) = \mathcal{G} \rtimes \text{Diff}(\mathcal{M})$

Note that the group of invariance of $\mathcal{X}$ is not a simple group as it always contains the normal subgroup $\mathcal{G}$. It was proved by Mather and Thurston that for ordinary (commutative) manifolds, the connected component of the identity in $\text{Diff}(\mathcal{M})$ is always a simple group, therefore no ordinary manifold can have this semi-direct product structure.

It is nevertheless possible to find such a space by enlarging the notion of space.

In noncommutative geometry, spaces are specified in algebraic terms. The algebraic object corresponding to a diffeomorphism is the automorphism of the algebra of coordinates. If the algebra is taken non-commutative it has trivial automorphisms (so-called inner automorphisms). These inner automorphisms form a normal subgroup of the group of automorphisms and provide the correct group structure.

Picking different algebras then give rise to different symmetries. The Spectral Standard Model takes as input the algebra $A = C^{\infty}(M) \otimes A_F$ where $C^{\infty}(M)$ is the algebra of differentiable functions encoding the 4-dimensional manifold and $A_F = \mathbb{C} \oplus \mathbb{H} \oplus M_3(\mathbb{C})$ is a finite dimensional algebra encoding the symmetries of the Standard Model.

== History ==
First ideas to use noncommutative geometry to particle physics appeared in 1988-89, and were formalized a couple of years later by Alain Connes and John Lott in what is known as the Connes-Lott model . The Connes-Lott model did not incorporate the gravitational field.

In 1997, Ali Chamseddine and Alain Connes published a new action principle, the Spectral Action, that made possible to incorporate the gravitational field into the model. Nevertheless, it was quickly noted that the model suffered from the notorious fermion-doubling problem (quadrupling of the fermions) and required neutrinos to be massless. One year later, experiments in Super-Kamiokande and Sudbury Neutrino Observatory began to show that solar and atmospheric neutrinos change flavors and therefore are massive, ruling out the Spectral Standard Model.

Only in 2006 a solution to the latter problem was proposed, independently by John W. Barrett and Alain Connes, almost at the same time. They show that massive neutrinos can be incorporated into the model by disentangling the KO-dimension (which is defined modulo 8) from the metric dimension (which is zero) for the finite space. By setting the KO-dimension to be 6, not only massive neutrinos were possible, but the see-saw mechanism was imposed by the formalism and the fermion doubling problem was also addressed.

The new version of the model was studied in, and under an additional assumption, known as the "big desert" hypothesis, computations were carried out to predict the Higgs boson mass around 170 GeV and postdict the top quark mass.

In August 2008, Tevatron experiments excluded a Higgs mass of 158 to 175 GeV/c^{2} at the 95% confidence level. Alain Connes acknowledged on a blog about non-commutative geometry that the prediction about the Higgs mass was invalidated. In July 2012, CERN announced the discovery of the Higgs boson with a mass around 125 GeV/c^{2}.

A proposal to address the problem of the Higgs mass was published by Ali Chamseddine and Alain Connes in 2012 by taking into account a real scalar field that was already present in the model but was neglected in previous analysis. Another solution to the Higgs mass problem was put forward by Christopher Estrada and Matilde Marcolli by studying renormalization group flow in presence of gravitational correction terms.

== See also ==
- Noncommutative geometry
- Noncommutative algebraic geometry
- Noncommutative quantum field theory
- Timeline of atomic and subatomic physics
