= Kadison–Kastler metric =

Metric on the C*-algebras on a fixed Hilbert space

In mathematics, the Kadison–Kastler metric is a metric on the space of C^{*}-algebras on a fixed Hilbert space. It is the Hausdorff distance between the unit balls of the two C^{*}-algebras, under the norm-induced metric on the space of all bounded operators on that Hilbert space.

It was used by Richard Kadison and Daniel Kastler to study the perturbation theory of von Neumann algebras.

== Formal definition ==
Let $\mathcal{H}$ be a Hilbert space and $B(\mathcal{H})$ denote the set of all bounded operators on $\mathcal{H}$. If $\mathfrak{A}$ and $\mathfrak{B}$ are linear subspaces of $B(\mathcal{H})$ and $\mathfrak{A}_1, \mathfrak{B}_1$ denote their unit balls, respectively, the Kadison–Kastler distance between them is defined as,

$$\| \mathfrak{A} - \mathfrak{B} \| := \sup \{ \|A - \mathfrak{B}_1\|, \|B - \mathfrak{A}_1 \| : A \in \mathfrak{A}_1, B \in \mathfrak{B}_1 \}.$$

The above notion of distance defines a metric on the space of C^{*}-algebras which is called the Kadison-Kastler metric.
