= Lycée Alfred Kastler =

Lycée Alfred Kastler may refer to:

- Lycée Alfred Kastler de Cergy-Pontoise
- Lycée Alfred Kastler - Dourdan
- Lycée Alfred Kastler - Guebwiller
- Lycée Alfred Kastler - Talence
