= Quantum gravity =

Description of gravity using discrete values

A depiction of the cGh cube

Depicted as a Venn diagram

Quantum gravity (QG) is a field of theoretical physics that seeks unification of the theory of gravity with the principles of quantum mechanics. It deals with environments in which neither gravitational nor quantum effects can be ignored, such as in the vicinity of black holes or similar compact astrophysical objects, as well as in the early stages of the universe moments after the Big Bang.

Three of the four fundamental interactions of nature are described within the framework of quantum mechanics and quantum field theory: the electromagnetic interaction, the strong interaction, and the weak interaction; this leaves gravity as the only interaction that has not been fully accommodated. The current understanding of gravity is based on Albert Einstein's general theory of relativity, which incorporates his theory of special relativity and deeply modifies the understanding of concepts like time and space. Although general relativity is highly regarded for its elegance and accuracy, it has limitations: the gravitational singularities inside black holes, the ad hoc postulation of dark matter, as well as dark energy and its relation to the cosmological constant are among the current unsolved mysteries regarding gravity, all of which signal the collapse of the general theory of relativity at different scales and highlight the need for a gravitational theory that goes into the quantum realm. At distances close to the Planck length, like those near the center of a black hole, quantum fluctuations of spacetime are expected to play an important role. Finally, the discrepancies between the predicted value for the vacuum energy and the observed values (which, depending on considerations, can be of 60 or 120 orders of magnitude) highlight the necessity for a quantum theory of gravity.

The field of quantum gravity is actively developing, and theorists are exploring a variety of approaches to the problem of quantum gravity, the most popular being M-theory and loop quantum gravity. All of these approaches aim to describe the quantum behavior of the gravitational field, which does not necessarily include unifying all fundamental interactions into a single mathematical framework. However, many approaches to quantum gravity, such as string theory, try to develop a framework that describes all fundamental forces. Such a theory is often referred to as a theory of everything. Some of the approaches, such as loop quantum gravity, make no such attempt; instead, they make an effort to quantize the gravitational field while it is kept separate from the other forces. Other lesser-known but no less important theories include causal dynamical triangulation, noncommutative geometry, and twistor theory.

One of the difficulties of formulating a quantum gravity theory is that direct observation of quantum gravitational effects is thought to only appear at length scales near the Planck scale, around 10^{−35} meters, a scale far smaller, and hence only accessible with far higher energies, than those currently available in high energy particle accelerators. Therefore, physicists lack experimental data which could distinguish between the competing theories which have been proposed. (Note: Quantum effects in the early universe might have an observable effect on the structure of the present universe, for example, or gravity might play a role in the unification of the other forces. Cf. the text by Wald cited above.) (Note: On the quantization of the geometry of spacetime, see also in the article Planck length, in the examples)

Thought experiment approaches have been suggested as a testing tool for quantum gravity theories. In the field of quantum gravity there are several open questions – e.g., it is not known how the spin of elementary particles sources gravity, and thought experiments could provide a pathway to explore possible resolutions to these questions, even in the absence of lab experiments or physical observations.

In the early 21st century, new experiment designs and technologies have arisen which suggest that indirect approaches to testing quantum gravity may be feasible over the next few decades. This field of study is called phenomenological quantum gravity.

== Overview ==
Unsolved problem in physics
How can the theory of quantum mechanics be merged with the theory of general relativity / gravitational force and remain correct at microscopic length scales? What verifiable predictions does any theory of quantum gravity make?
More unsolved problems in physics

Diagram showing the place of quantum gravity in the hierarchy of physics theories

Much of the difficulty in meshing these theories at all energy scales comes from the different assumptions that these theories make on how the universe works. General relativity models gravity as curvature of spacetime: in the slogan of John Archibald Wheeler, "Spacetime tells matter how to move; matter tells spacetime how to curve." On the other hand, quantum field theory is typically formulated in the flat spacetime used in special relativity. No theory has yet proven successful in describing the general situation where the dynamics of matter, modeled with quantum mechanics, affect the curvature of spacetime. If one attempts to treat gravity as simply another quantum field, the resulting theory is not renormalizable. Even in the simpler case where the curvature of spacetime is fixed a priori, developing quantum field theory becomes more mathematically challenging, and many ideas physicists use in quantum field theory on flat spacetime are no longer applicable.

It is widely hoped that a theory of quantum gravity would allow us to understand problems of very high energy and very small dimensions of space, such as the behavior of black holes, and the origin of the universe.

One major obstacle is that for quantum field theory in curved spacetime with a fixed metric, bosonic/fermionic operator fields supercommute for spacelike separated points. (This is a way of imposing a principle of locality.) However, in quantum gravity, the metric is dynamical, so that whether two points are spacelike separated depends on the state. In fact, they can be in a quantum superposition of being spacelike and not spacelike separated.

== Quantum mechanics and general relativity ==
=== Graviton ===
The observation that all fundamental forces except gravity have one or more known messenger particles leads researchers to believe that at least one must exist for gravity. This hypothetical particle is known as the graviton. These particles act as a force particle similar to the photon of the electromagnetic interaction. Under mild assumptions, the structure of general relativity requires them to follow the quantum mechanical description of interacting theoretical spin-2 massless particles. Many of the accepted notions of a unified theory of physics since the 1970s assume, and to some degree depend upon, the existence of the graviton. The Weinberg–Witten theorem places some constraints on theories in which the graviton is a composite particle. While gravitons are an important theoretical step in a quantum mechanical description of gravity, they are generally believed to be undetectable because they interact too weakly.

=== Nonrenormalizability of gravity ===
General relativity, like electromagnetism, is a classical field theory. One might expect that, as with electromagnetism, the gravitational force should also have a corresponding quantum field theory.

However, gravity is perturbatively nonrenormalizable. For a quantum field theory to be well defined according to this understanding of the subject, it must be asymptotically free or asymptotically safe. The theory must be characterized by a choice of finitely many parameters, which could, in principle, be set by experiment. For example, in quantum electrodynamics these parameters are the charge and mass of the electron, as measured at a particular energy scale.

On the other hand, in quantizing gravity there are, in perturbation theory, infinitely many independent parameters (counterterm coefficients) needed to define the theory. For a given choice of those parameters, one could make sense of the theory, but since it is impossible to conduct infinite experiments to fix the values of every parameter, it has been argued that one does not, in perturbation theory, have a meaningful physical theory. At low energies, the logic of the renormalization group tells us that, despite the unknown choices of these infinitely many parameters, quantum gravity will reduce to the usual Einstein theory of general relativity. On the other hand, if we could probe very high energies where quantum effects take over, then every one of the infinitely many unknown parameters would begin to matter, and we could make no predictions at all.

It is conceivable that, in the correct theory of quantum gravity, the infinitely many unknown parameters will reduce to a finite number that can then be measured. One possibility is that normal perturbation theory is not a reliable guide to the renormalizability of the theory, and that there really is a Ultraviolet fixed point for gravity. Since this is a question of non-perturbative quantum field theory, finding a reliable answer is difficult, pursued in the asymptotic safety program. Another possibility is that there are new, undiscovered symmetry principles that constrain the parameters and reduce them to a finite set. This is the route taken by string theory, where all of the excitations of the string essentially manifest themselves as new symmetries.

=== Quantum gravity as an effective field theory ===
In an effective field theory, all but the first few of the infinite set of parameters in a nonrenormalizable theory are suppressed by huge energy scales and hence can be neglected when computing low-energy effects. Thus, at least in the low-energy regime, the model is a predictive quantum field theory. Furthermore, many theorists argue that the Standard Model should be regarded as an effective field theory itself, with "nonrenormalizable" interactions suppressed by large energy scales and whose effects have consequently not been observed experimentally.

By treating general relativity as an effective field theory, one can actually make legitimate predictions for quantum gravity, at least for low-energy phenomena. An example is the well-known calculation of the tiny first-order quantum-mechanical correction to the classical Newtonian gravitational potential between two masses. Another example is the calculation of the corrections to the Bekenstein–Hawking entropy formula.

=== Spacetime background dependence ===
A fundamental lesson of general relativity is that there is no fixed spacetime background, as found in Newtonian mechanics and special relativity; the spacetime geometry is dynamic. While simple to grasp in principle, this is a complex idea to understand about general relativity, and its consequences are profound and not fully explored, even at the classical level. To a certain extent, general relativity can be seen to be a relational theory, in which the only physically relevant information is the relationship between different events in spacetime.

On the other hand, quantum mechanics has depended since its inception on a fixed background (non-dynamic) structure. In the case of quantum mechanics, it is time that is given and not dynamic, just as in Newtonian classical mechanics. In relativistic quantum field theory, just as in classical field theory, Minkowski spacetime is the fixed background of the theory.

==== String theory ====
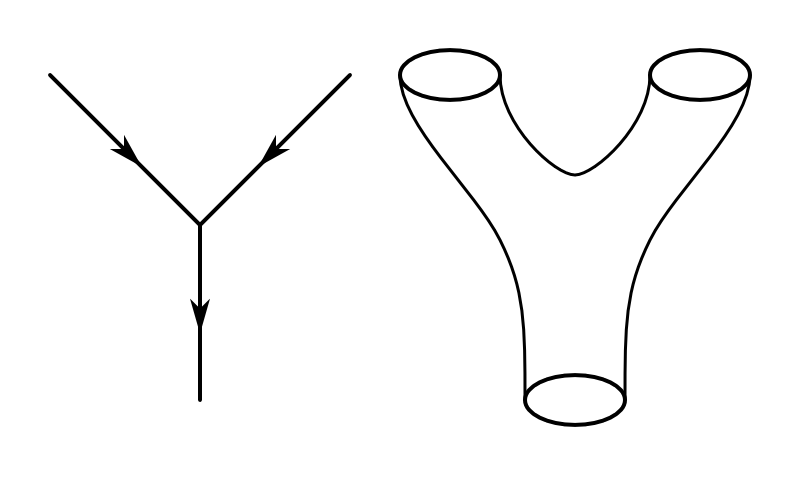
Interaction in the subatomic world: world lines of point-like particles in the Standard Model or a world sheet swept up by closed strings in string theory

String theory can be seen as a generalization of quantum field theory where instead of point particles, string-like objects propagate in a fixed spacetime background, although the interactions among closed strings give rise to space-time in a dynamic way. Although string theory had its origins in the study of quark confinement and not of quantum gravity, it was soon discovered that the string spectrum contains the graviton, and that "condensation" of certain vibration modes of strings is equivalent to a modification of the original background. In this sense, string perturbation theory exhibits exactly the features one would expect of a perturbation theory that may exhibit a strong dependence on asymptotics (as seen, for example, in the AdS/CFT correspondence) which is a weak form of background dependence.

==== Background independent theories ====
Loop quantum gravity is the fruit of an effort to formulate a background-independent quantum theory.

Topological quantum field theory provided an example of background-independent quantum theory, but with no local degrees of freedom, and only finitely many degrees of freedom globally. This is inadequate to describe gravity in 3+1 dimensions, which has local degrees of freedom according to general relativity. In 2+1 dimensions, however, gravity is a topological field theory, and it has been successfully quantized in several different ways, including spin networks.

=== Semi-classical quantum gravity ===
Quantum field theory on curved (non-Minkowskian) backgrounds, while not a full quantum theory of gravity, has shown many promising early results. In an analogous way to the development of quantum electrodynamics in the early part of the 20th century (when physicists considered quantum mechanics in classical electromagnetic fields), the consideration of quantum field theory on a curved background has led to predictions such as black hole radiation.

Phenomena such as the Unruh effect, in which particles exist in certain accelerating frames but not in stationary ones, do not pose any difficulty when considered on a curved background (the Unruh effect occurs even in flat Minkowskian backgrounds). The vacuum state is the state with the least energy (and may or may not contain particles).

=== Problem of time ===
A conceptual difficulty in combining quantum mechanics with general relativity arises from the contrasting role of time within these two frameworks. In quantum theories, time acts as an independent background through which states evolve, with the Hamiltonian operator acting as the generator of infinitesimal translations of quantum states through time. In contrast, general relativity treats time as a dynamical variable which relates directly with matter and moreover requires the Hamiltonian constraint to vanish. Because this variability of time has been observed macroscopically, it removes any possibility of employing a fixed notion of time, similar to the conception of time in quantum theory, at the macroscopic level.

== Candidate theories ==
There are a number of proposed quantum gravity theories. Currently, there is still no complete and consistent quantum theory of gravity, and the candidate models still need to overcome major formal and conceptual problems. They also face the common problem that, as yet, there is no way to put quantum gravity predictions to experimental tests, although there is hope for this to change as future data from cosmological observations and particle physics experiments become available.

=== String theory ===
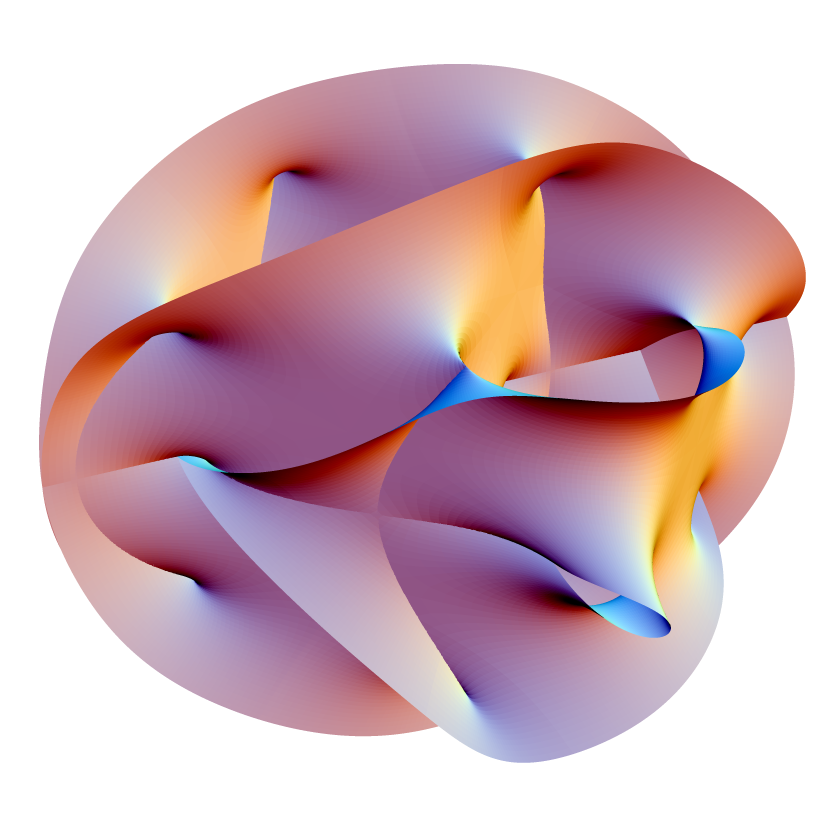
Projection of a Calabi–Yau manifold, one of the ways of compactifying the extra dimensions posited by string theory

The central idea of string theory is to replace the classical concept of a point particle in quantum field with a quantum theory of one-dimensional extended objects: strings. At the energies reached in current experiments, these strings are indistinguishable from point-like particles, but, crucially, different modes of oscillation of one and the same type of fundamental string appear as particles with different (electric and other) charges. In this way, string theory promises to be a unified description of all particles and interactions. The theory is successful in that one mode will always correspond to a graviton, the messenger particle of gravity; however, the price of this success is unusual features such as six extra dimensions of space in addition to the usual three for space and one for time.

In what is called the second superstring revolution, it was conjectured that both string theory and a unification of general relativity and supersymmetry known as supergravity form part of a hypothesized eleven-dimensional model known as M-theory, which would constitute a uniquely defined and consistent theory of quantum gravity. As presently understood, however, string theory admits a very large number (10^{500} by some estimates) of consistent vacua, comprising the so-called "string landscape". Sorting through this large family of solutions remains a major challenge.

=== Loop quantum gravity ===
Simple spin network of the type used in loop quantum gravity

Loop quantum gravity seriously considers general relativity's insight that spacetime is a dynamical field and is therefore a quantum object. Its second idea is that the quantum discreteness that determines the particle-like behavior of other field theories (for instance, the photons of the electromagnetic field) also affects the structure of space.

The main result of loop quantum gravity is that there is a granular structure of space at the Planck length. This is derived from the following considerations: In the case of electromagnetism, the quantum operator representing the energy of each frequency of the field has a discrete spectrum. Thus the energy of each frequency is quantized, and the quanta are the photons. In the case of gravity, the operators representing the area and the volume of each surface or space region likewise have discrete spectra. Thus area and volume of any portion of space are also quantized, where the quanta are elementary quanta of space. It follows, then, that spacetime has an elementary quantum granular structure at the Planck scale, which cuts off the ultraviolet infinities of quantum field theory.

The quantum state of spacetime is described in the theory by means of a mathematical structure called spin networks. Spin networks were initially introduced by Roger Penrose in abstract form, and later shown by Carlo Rovelli and Lee Smolin to derive naturally from a non-perturbative quantization of general relativity. Spin networks do not represent quantum states of a field in spacetime: they represent directly quantum states of spacetime.

The theory is based on the reformulation of general relativity known as Ashtekar variables, which represent geometric gravity using mathematical analogues of electric and magnetic fields. In the quantum theory, space is represented by a network structure called a spin network, evolving over time in discrete steps.

The dynamics of the theory is today constructed in several versions. One version starts with the canonical quantization of general relativity. The analogue of the Schrödinger equation is a Wheeler–DeWitt equation, which can be defined within the theory. In the covariant, or spinfoam formulation of the theory, the quantum dynamics is obtained via a sum over discrete versions of spacetime, called spinfoams. These represent histories of spin networks.

=== Other proposals ===
There are a number of other approaches to quantum gravity. The theories differ depending on which features of general relativity and quantum theory are accepted unchanged, and which features are modified. Such approaches include:

- Asymptotic safety in quantum gravity
- Euclidean quantum gravity
- Integral method
- Causal dynamical triangulation
- Causal fermion systems
- Causal Set Theory
- Covariant Feynman path integral approach
- Dilatonic quantum gravity
- Double copy theory
- Group field theory
- Wheeler–DeWitt equation
- Geometrodynamics
- Higher-spin theory
- Hořava–Lifshitz gravity
- MacDowell–Mansouri action
- Noncommutative geometry
- Path-integral based models of quantum cosmology
- Quadratic gravity
- Regge calculus
- Shape Dynamics
- String-nets and quantum graphity
- Supergravity
- Twistor theory
- Canonical quantum gravity
- An Exceptionally Simple Theory of Everything (Garret Lisi's E8 model)

== Experimental tests ==
As was emphasized above, quantum gravitational effects are extremely weak and therefore difficult to test. For this reason, the possibility of experimentally testing quantum gravity had not received much attention prior to the late 1990s. However, since the 2000s, physicists have realized that evidence for quantum gravitational effects can guide the development of the theory. Since theoretical development has been slow, the field of phenomenological quantum gravity, which studies the possibility of experimental tests, has obtained increased attention.

The most widely pursued possibilities for quantum gravity phenomenology include gravitationally mediated entanglement, violations of Lorentz invariance, imprints of quantum gravitational effects in the cosmic microwave background (in particular its polarization), and decoherence induced by fluctuations in the space-time foam. The latter scenario has been searched for in light from gamma-ray bursts and both astrophysical and atmospheric neutrinos, placing limits on phenomenological quantum gravity parameters.

ESA's INTEGRAL satellite measured polarization of photons of different wavelengths and was able to place a limit in the granularity of space that is less than 10^{−48} m, or 13 orders of magnitude below the Planck scale.

The BICEP2 experiment detected what was initially thought to be primordial B-mode polarization caused by gravitational waves in the early universe. Had the signal in fact been primordial in origin, it could have been an indication of quantum gravitational effects, but it soon transpired that the polarization was due to interstellar dust interference.

== See also ==
- De Sitter relativity
- Dilaton
- Doubly special relativity
- Gravitational decoherence
- Gravitomagnetism
- Hawking radiation
- List of quantum gravity researchers
- Orders of magnitude (length)
- Penrose interpretation
- Planck epoch
- Planck units
- Swampland (physics)
- Virtual black hole
- Weak gravity conjecture

== Sources ==
- Green, Michael B.; Schwarz, John H.; Witten, Edward (2012) [1987]. Superstring theory. 1: Introduction. Vol. l (25th Anniversary ed.). Cambridge University Press. ISBN 978-1-107-02911-8.
- Penrose, Roger (2005). The road to reality: a complete guide to the laws of the universe. New York: Knopf. ISBN 978-0-679-45443-4.
