= Infraparticle =

Type of dressed particle

An infraparticle is an electrically charged particle together with its surrounding cloud of soft photons—of which there are an infinite number, by virtue of the infrared divergence of quantum electrodynamics. That is, it is a dressed particle rather than a bare particle. Whenever electric charges accelerate they emit Bremsstrahlung radiation, whereby an infinite number of the virtual soft photons become real particles. However, only a finite number of these photons are detectable, the remainder falling below the measurement threshold.

The form of the electric field at infinity, which is determined by the velocity of a point charge, defines superselection sectors for the particle's Hilbert space. This is unlike the usual Fock space description, where the Hilbert space includes particle states with different velocities.

Because of their infraparticle properties, charged particles do not have a sharp delta function density of states like an ordinary particle, but instead the density of states rises like an inverse power at the mass $m$ of the particle. These states which are very close in mass to $m$ consist of the particle together with low-energy excitations of the electromagnetic field.

== Noether's theorem for gauge transformations ==
In electrodynamics and quantum electrodynamics, in addition to the global U(1) symmetry related to the electric charge, there are also position dependent gauge transformations. Noether's theorem states that for every infinitesimal symmetry transformation that is local (local in the sense that the transformed value of a field at a given point only depends on the field configuration in an arbitrarily small neighborhood of that point), there is a corresponding conserved charge called the Noether charge, which is the space integral of a Noether density (assuming the integral converges and there is a Noether current satisfying the continuity equation).

If this is applied to the global U(1) symmetry, the result

$Q=\int d^3x \rho(\vec{x})$ (over all of space)

is the conserved charge where ρ is the charge density. As long as the surface integral

$$\oint_{S^2} \vec{J}\cdot d\vec{S}$$

at the boundary at spatial infinity is zero, which is satisfied if the current density J falls off sufficiently fast, the quantity Q is conserved. This is nothing other than the familiar electric charge.

But what if there is a position-dependent (but not time-dependent) infinitesimal gauge transformation $\delta \psi(\vec{x})=iq\alpha(\vec{x})\psi(\vec{x})$ where α is some function of position?

The Noether charge is now

$$\int d^3x \left[\alpha(\vec{x})\rho(\vec{x})+\epsilon_0 \vec{E}(\vec{x})\cdot \nabla\alpha(\vec{x})\right]$$

where $\vec{E}$ is the electric field.

Using integration by parts,

$$\epsilon_0\oint_{S^2} \alpha \vec{E}\cdot d\vec{S} + \int d^3x \alpha\left[\rho-\epsilon_0 \nabla\cdot \vec{E}\right].$$

This assumes that the state in question approaches the vacuum asymptotically at spatial infinity. The first integral is the surface integral at spatial infinity and the second integral is zero by the Gauss law. Also assume that α(r,θ,φ) approaches α(θ,φ) as r approaches infinity (in polar coordinates). Then, the Noether charge only depends upon the value of α at spatial infinity but not upon the value of α at finite values. This is consistent with the idea that symmetry transformations not affecting the boundaries are gauge symmetries whereas those that do are global symmetries. If α(θ,φ) = 1 all over the S^{2}, we get the electric charge. But for other functions, we also get conserved charges (which are not so well known).

This conclusion holds both in classical electrodynamics as well as in quantum electrodynamics. If α is taken as the spherical harmonics, conserved scalar charges (the electric charge) are seen as well as conserved vector charges and conserved tensor charges. This is not a violation of the Coleman–Mandula theorem as there is no mass gap. In particular, for each direction (a fixed θ and φ), the quantity

$$\lim_{r\rightarrow \infty}\epsilon_0 r^2 E_r(r,\theta,\phi)$$

is a c-number and a conserved quantity. Using the result that states with different charges exist in different superselection sectors, the conclusion that states with the same electric charge but different values for the directional charges lie in different superselection sectors.

Even though this result is expressed in terms of particular spherical coordinates with a given origin, translations changing the origin do not affect spatial infinity.

== Implication for particle behavior ==
The directional charges are different for an electron that has always been at rest and an electron that has always been moving at a certain nonzero velocity (because of the Lorentz transformations). The conclusion is that both electrons lie in different superselection sectors no matter how tiny the velocity is. At first sight, this might appear to be in contradiction with Wigner's classification, which implies that the whole one-particle Hilbert space lies in a single superselection sector, but it is not because m is really the greatest lower bound of a continuous mass spectrum and eigenstates of m only exist in a rigged Hilbert space. The electron, and other particles like it is called an infraparticle.

The existence of the directional charges is related to soft photons. The directional charge at $t=-\infty$ and $t=\infty$ are the same if we take the limit as r goes to infinity first and only then take the limit as t approaches infinity. If we interchange the limits, the directional charges change. This is related to the expanding electromagnetic waves spreading outward at the speed of light (the soft photons).

More generally, there might exist a similar situation in other quantum field theories besides QED. The name "infraparticle" still applies in those cases.
