= Daniel Kastler =

French physicist (1926–2015)

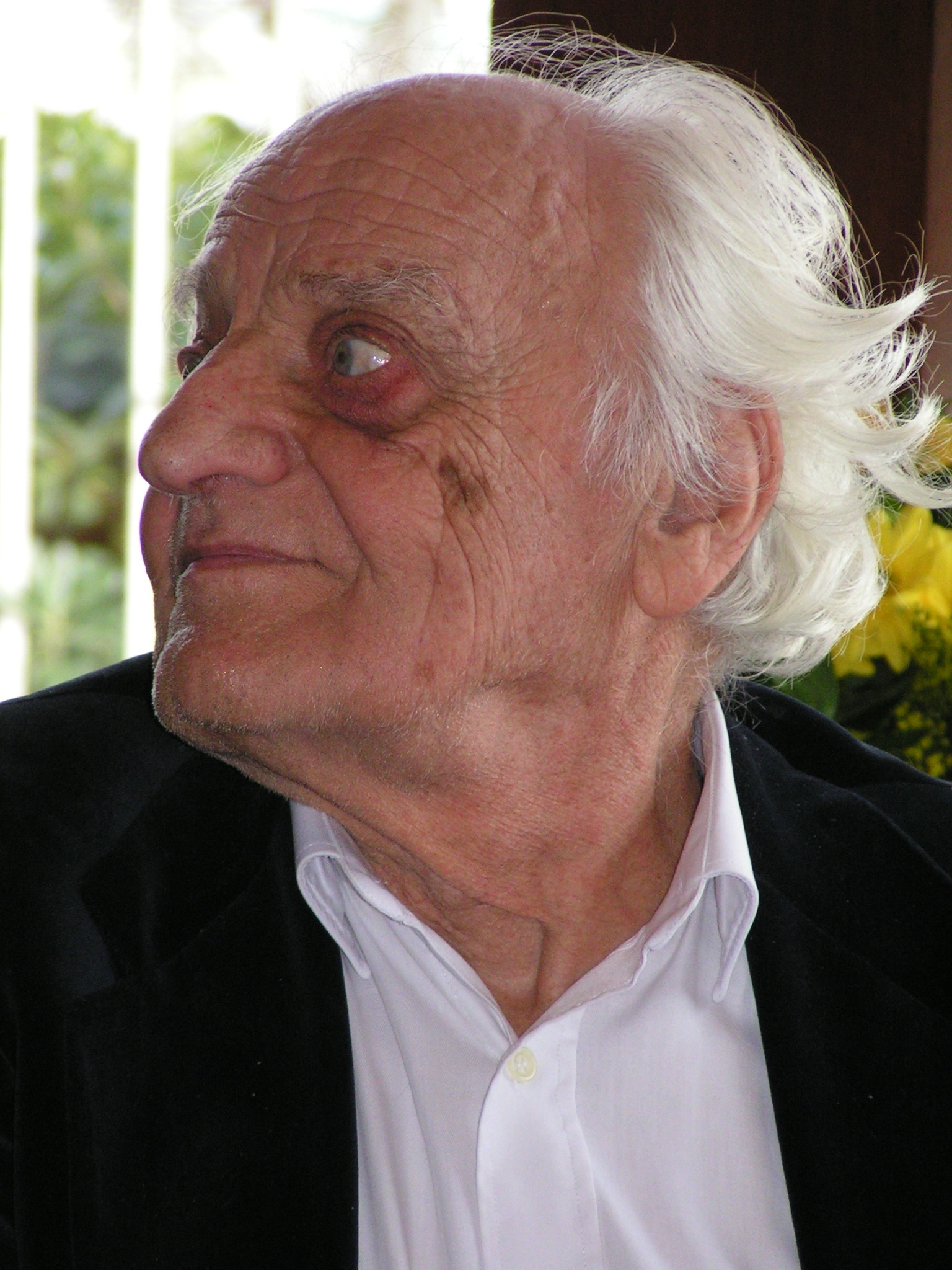
- Daniel Kastler in 2006
- Born: 4 March 1926; Colmar, France
- Died: 4 July 2015 (aged 89); Bandol, France
- Education: Ecole Normale Superieure; Saarland University
- Known for: Haag–Kastler axioms; Kadison–Kastler metric
- Awards: Ampère Prize (1984)
- Scientific career
- Fields: Physics
- Workplaces: Saarland University; Aix-Marseille University

Daniel Kastler (French: [kastlɛʁ]; 4 March 1926 – 4 July 2015) was a French theoretical physicist, working on the foundations of quantum field theory and on non-commutative geometry. He is known as the co-developer of the Kadison–Kastler metric and the Haag–Kastler axioms.

== Biography ==
Daniel Kastler was born on March 4, 1926, in Colmar, a city in the Haut-Rhin département in north-eastern France. He was the son of the 1966 Physics Nobel Prize laureate Alfred Kastler. In 1946 he enrolled at the École Normale Superieure in Paris. In 1950 he moved to Germany and became lecturer at the Saarland University. In 1953, he was promoted to associate professor and obtained a doctorate in quantum chemistry. In 1957 Kastler moved to the University of Aix-Marseille and became a full professor in 1959. In 1968 he founded, together with Jean-Marie Souriau and Andrea Visconti, the Center of Theoretical Physics in Marseille. Daniel Kastler died on July 8, 2015, in Bandol, in southern France.

Daniel Kastler is known in particular for his work with Rudolf Haag on the foundation of the algebraic approach to quantum field theory. Their collaboration started at the famous Lille Conference in 1957, where both were present, and culminated in the Haag–Kastler axioms for local observables of quantum field theories. This framework uses elements of the theory of operator algebras and is therefore referred to as algebraic quantum field theory or, from the physical point of view, as local quantum physics. In other collaborations, Kastler showed the importance of C*-algebras in the foundations of quantum statistical mechanics and in abelian asymptotic systems. In the 1980s he started working on Alain Connes' non-commutative geometry, especially studying the applications in elementary particle physics. In the same period Kastler, in collaboration with Raymond Stora, developed the geometrical setting for the BRST transformations for the quantization of gauge theories.

== Honors and awards ==
In 1984 Daniel Kastler was awarded the Prix Ampère of the French Academy of Sciences. Since 1977 he was a corresponding member of the Göttingen Academy of Sciences and since 1981 of the Austrian Academy of Sciences. Since 1995 he was a member of the German National Academy of Sciences Leopoldina.

== Selected publications ==
- Haag, Rudolf; Kastler, Daniel (1964). "An Algebraic approach to quantum field theory". Journal of Mathematical Physics. 5 (7): 848–861. Bibcode:1964JMP.....5..848H. doi:10.1063/1.1704187.
- Haag, Rudolf; Kastler, Daniel; Trych-Pohlmeyer, Ewa B. (1974). "Stability and equilibrium states". Communications in Mathematical Physics. 38 (3): 173–193. Bibcode:1974CMaPh..38..173H. doi:10.1007/BF01651541. S2CID 123017142.
- Araki, Huzihiro; Kastler, Daniel; Takesaki, Masamichi; Haag, Rudolf (1977). "Extension of KMS States and Chemical Potential". Communications in Mathematical Physics. 53 (2): 97–134. Bibcode:1977CMaPh..53...97A. doi:10.1007/BF01609126. S2CID 122319446.
- Kastler, Daniel (1995). "The Dirac operator and gravitation". Communications in Mathematical Physics. 166 (3): 633–644. Bibcode:1995CMaPh.166..633K. doi:10.1007/BF02099890. S2CID 119959800.
- Kastler, Daniel (1993). "A Detailed account of Alain Connes' version of the Standard Model in noncommutative geometry. 1. and 2". Reviews in Mathematical Physics. 5 (3): 477–532. Bibcode:1993RvMaP...5..477K. doi:10.1142/S0129055X93000140.
- Kastler, Daniel (1988). Cyclic cohomology within the differential envelope: an introduction to Alain Connes' non-commutative differential geometry. Hermann. ISBN 978-2705660444.
- Kastler, Daniel (1960). Introduction à l'électrodynamique quantique. Dunod. ASIN B0019I06LU.
- Kastler, Daniel; Stora, Raymond (1986). "A differential geometric setting for BRS transformations and anomalies. 1". Journal of Geometry and Physics. 3 (4): 437. Bibcode:1986JGP.....3..437K. doi:10.1016/0393-0440(86)90006-9.
- Kastler, Daniel; Stora, Raymond (1986). "A differential geometric setting for BRS transformations and anomalies. 2". Journal of Geometry and Physics. 3 (4): 483–505. Bibcode:1986JGP.....3..483K. doi:10.1016/0393-0440(86)90007-0.

== See also ==
- Axiomatic quantum field theory
- Hilbert's sixth problem
- Kadison–Kastler metric
- Local quantum physics
- Non-commutative geometry
- Quantum field theory
