= Superselection =

Rule forbidding the coherence of certain states

In quantum mechanics, superselection extends the concept of selection rules.

Superselection rules are postulated rules forbidding the preparation of quantum states that exhibit coherence between eigenstates of certain observables. It was originally introduced by Gian Carlo Wick, Arthur Wightman, and Eugene Wigner to impose additional restrictions to quantum theory beyond those of selection rules.

Mathematically speaking, two quantum states $\psi_1$ and $\psi_2$ are separated by a selection rule if $\langle \psi_1 | H | \psi_2 \rangle = 0$ for the given Hamiltonian $H$, while they are separated by a superselection rule if $\langle \psi_1 | A | \psi_2 \rangle = 0$ for all physical observables $A$. Because no observable connects $\langle \psi_1 |$ and $| \psi_2 \rangle$ they cannot be put into a quantum superposition $\alpha | \psi_1 \rangle + \beta | \psi_2 \rangle$, and/or a quantum superposition cannot be distinguished from a classical mixture of the two states. It also implies that there is a classically conserved quantity that differs between the two states.

A superselection sector is a concept used in quantum mechanics when a representation of a *-algebra is decomposed into irreducible components. It formalizes the idea that not all self-adjoint operators are observables because the relative phase of a superposition of nonzero states from different irreducible components is not observable (the expectation values of the observables can't distinguish between them).

== Formulation ==
Suppose A is a unital *-algebra and O is a unital *-subalgebra whose self-adjoint elements correspond to observables. A unitary representation of O may be decomposed as the direct sum of irreducible unitary representations of O. Each isotypic component in this decomposition is called a superselection sector. Observables preserve the superselection sectors.

== Relationship to symmetry ==
Symmetries often give rise to superselection sectors (although this is not the only way they occur). Suppose a group G acts upon A, and that H is a unitary representation of both A and G which is equivariant in the sense that for all g in G, a in A and ψ in H,

$$g (a\cdot\psi) = (ga)\cdot (g\psi)$$

Suppose that O is an invariant subalgebra of A under G (all observables are invariant under G, but not every self-adjoint operator invariant under G is necessarily an observable). H decomposes into superselection sectors, each of which is the tensor product of an irreducible representation of G with a representation of O.

This can be generalized by assuming that H is only a representation of an extension or cover K of G. (For instance G could be the Lorentz group, and K the corresponding spin double cover.) Alternatively, one can replace G by a Lie algebra, Lie superalgebra or a Hopf algebra.

== Examples ==
Consider a quantum mechanical particle confined to a closed loop (i.e., a periodic line of period L). The superselection sectors are labeled by an angle θ between 0 and 2π. All the wave functions within a single superselection sector satisfy

$$\psi(x+L)=e^{i \theta}\psi(x).$$

== Superselection sectors ==
A large physical system with infinitely many degrees of freedom does not always visit every possible state, even if it has enough energy. If a magnet is magnetized in a certain direction, each spin will fluctuate at any temperature, but the net magnetization will never change. The reason is that it is infinitely improbable that all the infinitely many spins at each different position will all fluctuate together in the same way.

A big system often has superselection sectors. In a solid, different rotations and translations which are not lattice symmetries define superselection sectors. In general, a superselection rule is a quantity that can never change through local fluctuations. Aside from order parameters like the magnetization of a magnet, there are also topological quantities, like the winding number. If a string is wound around a circular wire, the total number of times it winds around never changes under local fluctuations. This is an ordinary conservation law. If the wire is an infinite line, under conditions that the vacuum does not have winding number fluctuations which are coherent throughout the system, the conservation law is a superselection rule --- the probability that the winding will unwind is zero.

There are quantum fluctuations, superpositions arising from different configurations of a phase-type path integral, and statistical fluctuations from a Boltzmann type path integral. Both of these path integrals have the property that large changes in an effectively infinite system require an improbable conspiracy between the fluctuations. So there are both statistical mechanical and quantum mechanical superselection rules.

In a theory where the vacuum is invariant under a symmetry, the conserved charge leads to superselection sectors in the case that the charge is conserved. Electric charge is conserved in our universe, so it seems at first like a trivial example. But when a superconductor fills space, or equivalently in a Higgs phase, electric charge is still globally conserved but no longer defines the superselection sectors. The sloshing of the superconductor can bring charges into any volume at very little cost. In this case, the superselection sectors of the vacuum are labeled by the direction of the Higgs field. Since different Higgs directions are related by an exact symmetry, they are all exactly equivalent. This suggests a deep relationship between symmetry breaking directions and conserved charges.

=== Discrete symmetry ===
In the 2D Ising model, at low temperatures, there are two distinct pure states, one with the average spin pointing up and the other with the average spin pointing down. This is the ordered phase. At high temperatures, there is only one pure state with an average spin of zero. This is the disordered phase. At the phase transition between the two, the symmetry between spin up and spin down is broken.

Below the phase transition temperature, an infinite ising model can be in either the mostly-plus or the mostly-minus configuration. If it starts in the mostly-plus phase, it will never reach the mostly-minus, even though flipping all the spins will give the same energy. By changing the temperature, the system acquired a new superselection rule--- the average spin. There are two superselection sectors--- mostly minus and mostly plus.

There are also other superselection sectors; for instance, states where the left half of the plane is mostly plus and the right half of the plane is mostly minus.

When a new superselection rule appears, the system has spontaneously ordered. Above the critical temperature, the ising model is disordered. It could visit every state in principle. Below the transition, the system chooses one of two possibilities at random and never changes its mind.

For any finite system, the superselection is imperfect. An Ising model on a finite lattice will eventually fluctuate from the mostly plus to the mostly minus at any nonzero temperature, but it takes a very long time. The amount of time is exponentially small in the size of the system measured in correlation lengths, so for all practical purposes the flip never happens even in systems only a few times larger than the correlation length.

=== Continuous symmetries ===
If a statistical or quantum field has three real valued scalar fields $\phi_1,\phi_2,\phi_3$, and the energy or action only depends on combinations which are symmetric under rotations of these components into each other, the contributions with the lowest dimension are (summation convention):

$$|\nabla \phi_i|^2 + t \phi_i^2 + \lambda (\phi_i^2)^2
\,$$

and define the action in a quantum field context or free energy in the statistical context. There are two phases. When t is large, the potential tends to move the average $\phi$ to zero. For t large and negative, the quadratic potential pushes $\phi$ out, but the quartic potential prevents it from becoming infinite. If this is done in a quantum path integral, this is a quantum phase transition, in a classical partition function, a classical phase transition.

So as t moves toward more negative values in either context, the field has to choose some direction to point. Once it does this, it cannot change its mind. The system has ordered. In the ordered phase, there is still a little bit of symmetry--- rotations around the axis of the breaking. The field can point in any direction labelled by all the points on a unit sphere in $\phi$ space, which is the coset space of the unbroken SO(2) subgroup in the full symmetry group SO(3).

In the disordered phase, the superselection sectors are described by the representation of SO(3) under which a given configuration transforms globally. Because the SO(3) is unbroken, different representations will not mix with each other. No local fluctuation will ever bring in nontrivial SO(3) configurations from infinity. A local configuration is entirely defined by its representation.

There is a mass gap, or a correlation length, which separates configurations with a nontrivial SO(3) transformations from the rotationally invariant vacuum. This is true until the critical point in t where the mass gap disappears and the correlation length is infinite. The vanishing gap is a sign that the fluctuations in the SO(3) field are about to condense.

In the ordered region, there are field configurations which can carry topological charge. These are labeled by elements of the second homotopy group $\pi_2(SO(3)/SO(2))=\mathbb{Z}$. Each of these describe a different field configuration which at large distances from the origin is a winding configuration. Although each such isolated configuration has infinite energy, it labels superselection sectors where the difference in energy between two states is finite. In addition, pairs of winding configurations with opposite topological charge can be produced copiously as the transition is approached from below.

When the winding number is zero, so that the field everywhere points in the same direction, there is an additional infinity of superselection sectors, each labelled by a different value of the unbroken SO(2) charge.

In the ordered state, there is a mass gap for the superselection sectors labeled by a nonzero integer, because the topological solitons are massive, even infinitely massive. But there is no mass gap for all the superselection sectors labeled by zero because there are massless Goldstone bosons describing fluctuations in the direction of the condensate.

If the field values are identified under a Z_{2} reflection (corresponding to flipping the sign of all the $\phi$ fields), the superselection sectors are labelled by a nonnegative integer (the absolute value of the topological charge).

O(3) charges only make sense in the disordered phase and not at all in the ordered phase. This is because when the symmetry is broken there is a condensate which is charged, which is not invariant under the symmetry group. Conversely, the topological charge only makes sense in the ordered phase and not at all in the disordered phase, because in some hand-waving way there is a "topological condensate" in the disordered phase which randomizes the field from point to point. The randomizing can be thought of as crossing many condensed topological winding boundaries.

The very question of what charges are meaningful depends very much on the phase. Approaching the phase transition from the disordered side, the mass of the charges particles approaches zero. Approaching it from the ordered side, the mass gap associated with fluctuations of the topological solitons approaches zero.

== Examples in particle physics ==
Higgs mechanism

In the Standard Model of particle physics, in the electroweak sector, the low energy model is SU(2) and U(1) broken to U(1) by a Higgs doublet. The only superselection rule determining the configuration is the total electric charge. If there are monopoles, then the monopole charge must be included.

If the Higgs t parameter is varied so that it does not acquire a vacuum expectation value, the universe is now symmetric under an unbroken SU(2) and U(1) gauge group. If the SU(2) has infinitesimally weak couplings, so that it only confines at enormous distances, then the representation of the SU(2) group and the U(1) charge both are superselection rules. But if the SU(2) has a nonzero coupling then the superselection sectors are separated by infinite mass because the mass of any state in a nontrivial representation is infinite.

By changing the temperature, the Higgs fluctuations can zero out the expectation value at a finite temperature. Above this temperature, the SU(2) and U(1) quantum numbers describe the superselection sectors. Below the phase transition, only electric charge defines the superselection sector.

Chiral quark condensate

Consider the global flavour symmetry of QCD in the chiral limit where the masses of the quarks are zero. This is not exactly the universe in which we live, where the up and down quarks have a tiny but nonzero mass, but it is a very good approximation, to the extent that isospin is conserved.

Below a certain temperature which is the symmetry restoration temperature, the phase is ordered. The chiral condensate forms, and pions of small mass are produced. The SU(N_{f}) charges, Isospin and Hypercharge and SU(3), make sense. Above the QCD temperature lies a disordered phase where SU(N_{f})×SU(N_{f}) and color SU(3) charges make sense.

It is an open question whether the deconfinement temperature of QCD is also the temperature at which the chiral condensate melts.
