= Algebraic quantum field theory =

Axiomatic approach to quantum field theory

Algebraic quantum field theory (AQFT) is an application to local quantum physics of C*-algebra theory. It is also referred to as the Haag–Kastler axiomatic framework for quantum field theory, because it was introduced by Rudolf Haag and Daniel Kastler (1964). The axioms are stated in terms of an algebra given for every open set in Minkowski space, and mappings between those.

== Haag–Kastler axioms ==
Let $\mathcal{O}$ be the set of all open and bounded subsets of Minkowski space. An algebraic quantum field theory is defined via a set $\{\mathcal{A}(O)\}_{O\in\mathcal{O}}$ of von Neumann algebras $\mathcal{A}(O)$ on a common Hilbert space $\mathcal{H}$ satisfying the following axioms:

- Isotony: $O_1 \subset O_2$ implies $\mathcal{A}(O_1) \subset \mathcal{A}(O_2)$.
- Causality: If $O_1$ is space-like separated from $O_2$, then $[\mathcal{A}(O_1),\mathcal{A}(O_2)]=0$.
- Poincaré covariance: A strongly continuous unitary representation $U(\mathcal{P})$ of the Poincaré group $\mathcal{P}$ on $\mathcal{H}$ exists such that $\mathcal{A}(gO) = U(g) \mathcal{A}(O) U(g)^*,\,\,g \in \mathcal{P}.$
- Spectrum condition: The joint spectrum $\mathrm{Sp}(P)$ of the energy-momentum operator $P$ (i.e. the generator of space-time translations) is contained in the closed forward lightcone.
- Existence of a vacuum vector: A cyclic and Poincaré-invariant vector $\Omega\in\mathcal{H}$ exists.

The net algebras $\mathcal{A}(O)$ are called local algebras and the C* algebra $\mathcal{A} := \overline{\bigcup_{O\in\mathcal{O}}\mathcal{A}(O)}$ is called the quasilocal algebra.

== Category-theoretic formulation ==
Let Mink be the category of open subsets of Minkowski space M with inclusion maps as morphisms. We are given a covariant functor $\mathcal{A}$ from Mink to uC*alg, the category of unital C* algebras, such that every morphism in Mink maps to a monomorphism in uC*alg (isotony).

The Poincaré group acts continuously on Mink. There exists a pullback of this action, which is continuous in the norm topology of $\mathcal{A}(M)$ (Poincaré covariance).

Minkowski space has a causal structure. If an open set V lies in the causal complement of an open set U, then the image of the maps

$$\mathcal{A}(i_{U,U\cup V})$$

and

$$\mathcal{A}(i_{V,U\cup V})$$

commute (spacelike commutativity). If $\bar{U}$ is the causal completion of an open set U, then $\mathcal{A}(i_{U,\bar{U}})$ is an isomorphism (primitive causality).

A state with respect to a C*-algebra is a positive linear functional over it with unit norm. If we have a state over $\mathcal{A}(M)$, we can take the "partial trace" to get states associated with $\mathcal{A}(U)$ for each open set via the net monomorphism. The states over the open sets form a presheaf structure.

According to the GNS construction, for each state, we can associate a Hilbert space representation of $\mathcal{A}(M).$ Pure states correspond to irreducible representations and mixed states correspond to reducible representations. Each irreducible representation (up to equivalence) is called a superselection sector. We assume there is a pure state called the vacuum such that the Hilbert space associated with it is a unitary representation of the Poincaré group compatible with the Poincaré covariance of the net such that if we look at the Poincaré algebra, the spectrum with respect to energy-momentum (corresponding to spacetime translations) lies on and in the positive light cone. This is the vacuum sector.

== QFT in curved spacetime ==
More recently, the approach has been further implemented to include an algebraic version of quantum field theory in curved spacetime. Indeed, the viewpoint of local quantum physics is in particular suitable to generalize the renormalization procedure to the theory of quantum fields developed on curved backgrounds. Several rigorous results concerning QFT in presence of a black hole have been obtained.
