= Typhoon Wutip (2019) =

Pacific typhoon in 2019

Typhoon Wutip (Betty)
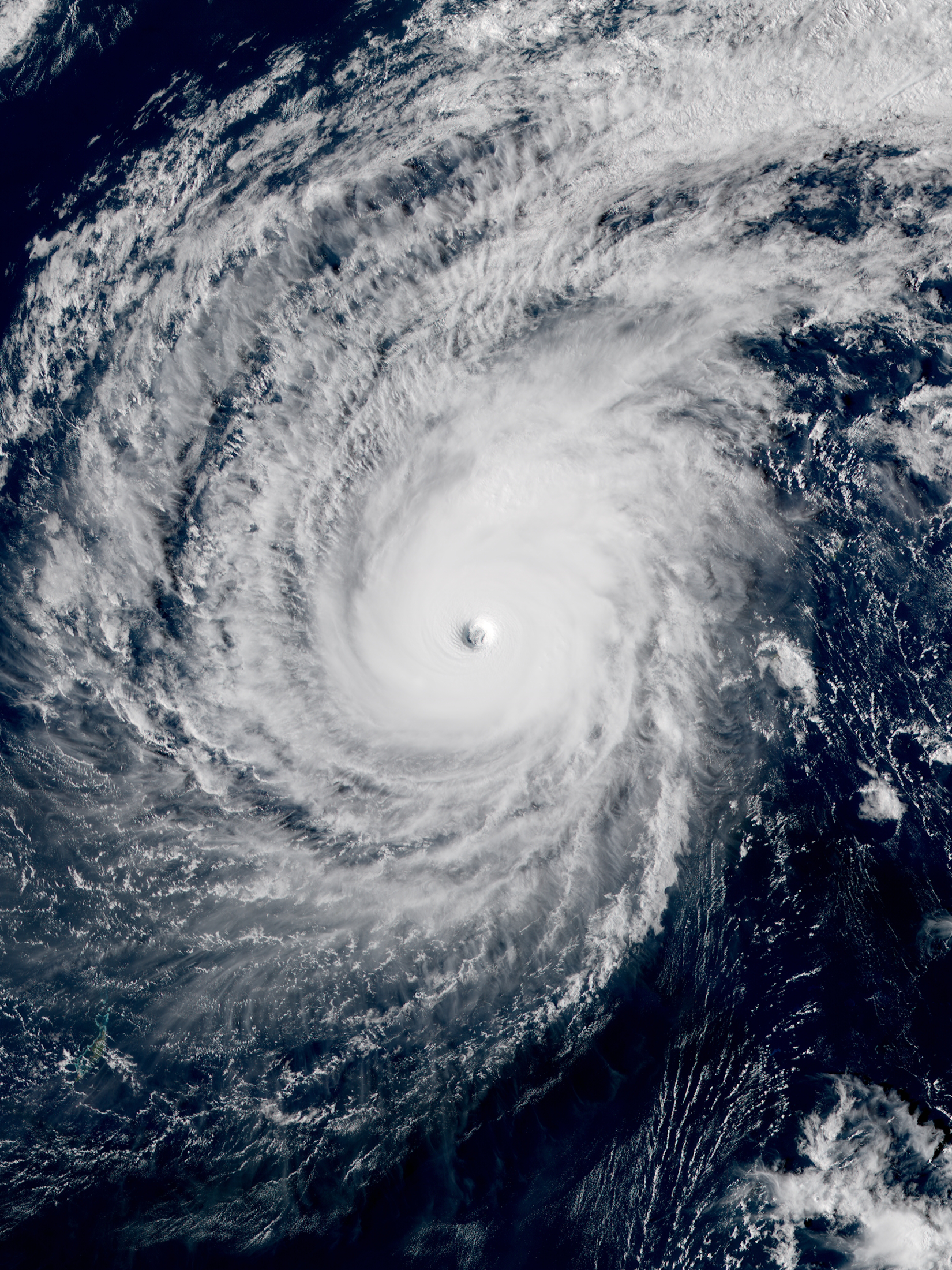
- Wutip at its secondary peak intensity west of the island of Guam, on February 25

Meteorological history
- Formed: February 18, 2019
- Dissipated: March 2, 2019

Violent typhoon
- 10-minute sustained (JMA)
- Highest winds: 195 km/h (120 mph)
- Lowest pressure: 920 hPa (mbar); 27.17 inHg

Category 5-equivalent super typhoon
- 1-minute sustained (SSHWS/JTWC)
- Highest winds: 270 km/h (165 mph)
- Lowest pressure: 895 hPa (mbar); 26.43 inHg

Overall effects
- Casualties: None reported
- Damage: >$3.3 million (2019 USD)
- Areas affected: Marshall Islands, Federated States of Micronesia, Guam, Northern Mariana Islands
- IBTrACS
- Part of the 2019 Pacific typhoon season

Typhoon Wutip (Note: The name Wutip (Cantonese: 蝴蝶, [wuː˨˩ tiːp̚˨]) was contributed by Macau and means butterfly in Cantonese.) was the most powerful February typhoon on record, surpassing Typhoon Higos of 2015. The third tropical cyclone, second tropical storm, and the first typhoon of the 2019 Pacific typhoon season, Wutip originated as a tropical disturbance near the Marshall Islands on February 12, that generally tracked westward, passing just south of the Federated States of Micronesia (FSM), before organizing into a tropical depression on February 18. The depression was later classified a tropical storm a day later, attaining the name Wutip from the Japan Meteorological Agency. The storm gradually intensified as it turned northwest, before it underwent rapid intensification on February 23, while passing to the southwest of Guam, and reached its first peak intensity. With winds of 270 km/h (165 mph) estimated by the Joint Typhoon Warning Center, Wutip became the first Category 5-equivalent super typhoon on record in the month of February. Wutip underwent an eyewall replacement cycle shortly afterward and weakened. The storm finished its cycle on February 24, rapidly intensifying once again. Wutip reached a secondary peak intensity the following day, again attaining Category 5-equivalent winds. Thereafter, Wutip rapidly weakened for the rest of its lifespan from strong vertical wind shear, before dissipating over the Philippine Sea on March 2.

Before becoming a tropical depression, Wutip poured heavy rain across the Marshall Islands. As tropical cyclone watches and warnings were issued and citizens sought shelter, Typhoon Wutip crossed the FSM and inflicted significant damage towards its agriculture and infrastructure, contaminating water sources across the affected islands with its floods and leaving 11,575 people in need of food. Later on, Wutip induced power outages in Guam and caused damage that added to the total of over $3.3 million (2019 USD). The Northern Mariana Islands received minor impact, and there were no casualties reported in any of the affected areas nonetheless. In response to the effects, both the FSM and Guam received aid from international governments and organizations.

== Meteorological history ==
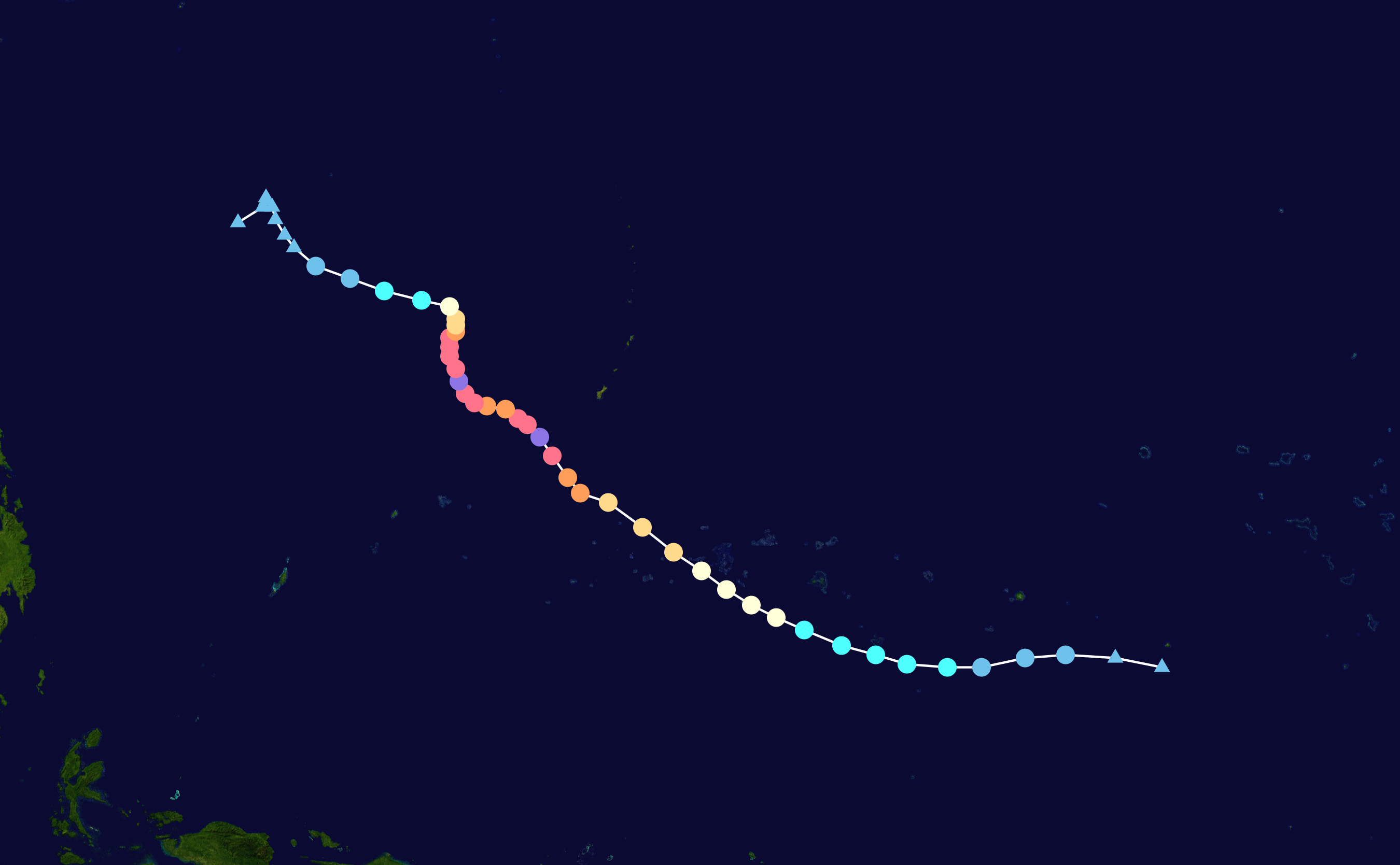
Map plotting the storm's track and intensity, according to the Saffir–Simpson scale Map key Saffir–Simpson scale Tropical depression (≤38 mph, ≤62 km/h) Tropical storm (39–73 mph, 63–118 km/h) Category 1 (74–95 mph, 119–153 km/h) Category 2 (96–110 mph, 154–177 km/h) Category 3 (111–129 mph, 178–208 km/h) Category 4 (130–156 mph, 209–251 km/h) Category 5 (≥157 mph, ≥252 km/h) Unknown Storm type Tropical cyclone Subtropical cyclone Extratropical cyclone, remnant low, tropical disturbance, or monsoon depression

Typhoon Wutip originated as a large mass of cumulonimbus clouds near the Marshall Islands on February 12, 2019, forming at a low latitude of 3°N. Initially disorganized, the slow-moving cluster consolidated into a more cohesive system, expanding north. On February 16, the Japan Meteorological Agency (JMA) (Note: The Japan Meteorological Agency is the official Regional Specialized Meteorological Center for the western Pacific Ocean.) detected the system as a low-pressure area moving westward. While southeast of Kosrae, vigorous convergence of trade winds north of the tropical disturbance spawned sporadic convection, or thunderstorms. A circulation was later detected the next day by a scatterometer, seemingly aided by the storm's twin cyclone in the Southern Hemisphere, Cyclone Oma. However, southeasterly vertical wind shear separated convection from the circulation for two days, possibly influenced by Oma's outflow. After further organizing, the JMA marked the system a tropical depression on February 18. The convection then broadened over the system's large but weak circulation, as it situated over an area of low wind shear and warm sea surface temperatures of 28–29 °C (82–84 °F)—conditions which are conducive for tropical cyclogenesis; the Joint Typhoon Warning Center (JTWC) (Note: The Joint Typhoon Warning Center is a joint United States Navy – United States Air Force task force that issues tropical cyclone warnings for the western Pacific Ocean and other regions.) assigned it the numeral identifier 02W the next day, when the storm had deepened its rainbands over its northern and western quadrants. As the storm developed from high ocean heat content (OHC) and outflow towards the equator and North Pole, the JMA and JTWC simultaneously ranked the newborn cyclone a tropical storm at 18:00 UTC, with the former giving it the name Wutip.

Environmental conditions remained favorable for intensification, with the addition of diffluence aloft, allowing Wutip to become a severe tropical storm on February 20 after attaining 10-minute sustained winds of 95 km/h (60 mph). Wutip further intensified into a typhoon at 18:00 UTC, according to the JMA, as a central dense overcast began to surface. With Wutip moving west-northwestward alongside a subtropical ridge to the north, an eye formation was detected on microwave imagery; on this basis, the JTWC upgraded Wutip to a typhoon early on February 21. Wutip then made a direct hit over Pulusuk during the day while passing near the Mortlock Islands. Significant intensification continued over warm waters as rainbands tightened towards the deepened core. Its motion also mitigated the effects of wind shear, and additionally, a ragged eye emerged on satellite imagery. With rainbands extending 370 km (230 mi), the very compact system then steered in a general northwestward direction, with the eye occasionally appearing throughout February 22. Despite a decrease in sea surface temperatures, low wind shear combined with an excellent poleward outflow channel commenced a period of rapid intensification on February 23. While southwest of Guam, Wutip presented a compact eyewall, and achieved its initial peak intensity at 12:00 UTC; the JMA estimated 10-minute sustained winds of 195 km/h (120 mph) and the lowest barometric pressure of 920 hPa (27.17 inHg) around that time. The JTWC operationally estimated 1-minute sustained winds of 250 km/h (155 mph), re-classifying Wutip as a super typhoon; however, post-season analysis determined that it had attained winds of 270 km/h (165 mph) two hours prior—making Wutip equivalent to a Category 5 hurricane on the Saffir–Simpson hurricane wind scale.

Typhoon Wutip during an eyewall replacement cycle from February 23 to 25

A moat—a clear ring outside the eyewall—separated the inner core from deep banding features, indicating the onset of an eyewall replacement cycle. During the process, the western edge eroded off the well-defined but warming eyewall as the eye cooled down, signaling a weakening trend. Development was further hampered by dry air intrusion and the storm's entrance to an environment of low OHC; conditions in the upper troposphere however, remained favorable. The moat separating the primary and secondary eyewall then diminished, while the storm became asymmetrical. Upon completion the next day, the eyewall thickened, and its associated convection was replenished and reorganized, becoming well-defined and annular, resuming a trend of rapid intensification. With outflow amplified by a zonal jet stream to the north, Wutip reached a secondary peak intensity at 06:00 UTC of February 25, with 10-minute winds of 185 km/h (115 mph) and atmospheric pressure of 935 hPa (27.61 inHg) assessed by the JMA, and 1-minute winds of 260 km/h (160 mph) assessed by the JTWC, again becoming a Category 5-equivalent super typhoon. Although maintaining deep convective rings, Wutip did not hold this intensity for long, and by the following day, weakened to below super typhoon strength. Cloud tops warmed up as the eye became cloud-filled. The storm drifted northward along a weak point in the subtropical ridge to the east. Following a significant increase in vertical wind shear, Wutip's structure began to rapidly deteriorate, no longer exhibiting an eye.

The storm decelerated from a saddle point as it entered the southern edge of the westerlies, meeting higher levels of unfavorable wind shear. An upper-level trough situated to the west of the storm also reinforced wind shear, further disrupting convection despite the robust outflow. By 12:00 UTC of February 27, Wutip had weakened back into a severe tropical storm. Convection later decreased significantly, prompting the JTWC to downgrade Wutip to tropical storm status. As Wutip turned west-northwestward, deep convection detached from the storm and dissipated, preventing additional development. By February 28, wind shear had completely exposed the well-organized circulation. The JMA downgraded Wutip to a tropical storm at 00:00 UTC, before downgrading it further to a tropical depression six hours later, though the JTWC had already assessed Wutip as a tropical depression at the former time. On the same day, Wutip crossed the 135°E boundary of the Philippine Area of Responsibility, receiving the local name Betty from the PAGASA—the national weather agency for the Philippines. The JTWC discontinued advisories on Wutip, anticipating complete disintegration from unfavorable conditions whereas the JMA continued monitoring the depression until it had dissipated near east of the Philippines on March 2.

=== Records ===
Wutip was the most powerful typhoon in the month of February on record, surpassing Typhoon Higos of 2015, while also being the longest-lasting typhoon of that month as well. In addition, Wutip is the first and only tropical cyclone in the Northern Hemisphere with Category 5-equivalent winds during the month in history. Only seven Category 4- or Category 5-equivalent typhoons were recorded in the months of January and February since the late 1940s, including three other storms in February that attained Category 4 strength.

== Preparations and impact ==
=== Marshall Islands ===
As a tropical disturbance, Wutip poured heavy rain over the central and southern islands or atolls of the Marshall Islands from February 12 to 18. Majuro reported 57 mm (2.26 in) of 24-hour rain on February 13, while Kwajalein experienced 89 mm (3.51 in) on February 18, which accounted for 73% of the monthly total. Despite this, the Marshall Islands did not receive enough rainfall to alleviate a recent drought, particularly in the northernmost atolls.

=== Federated States of Micronesia ===
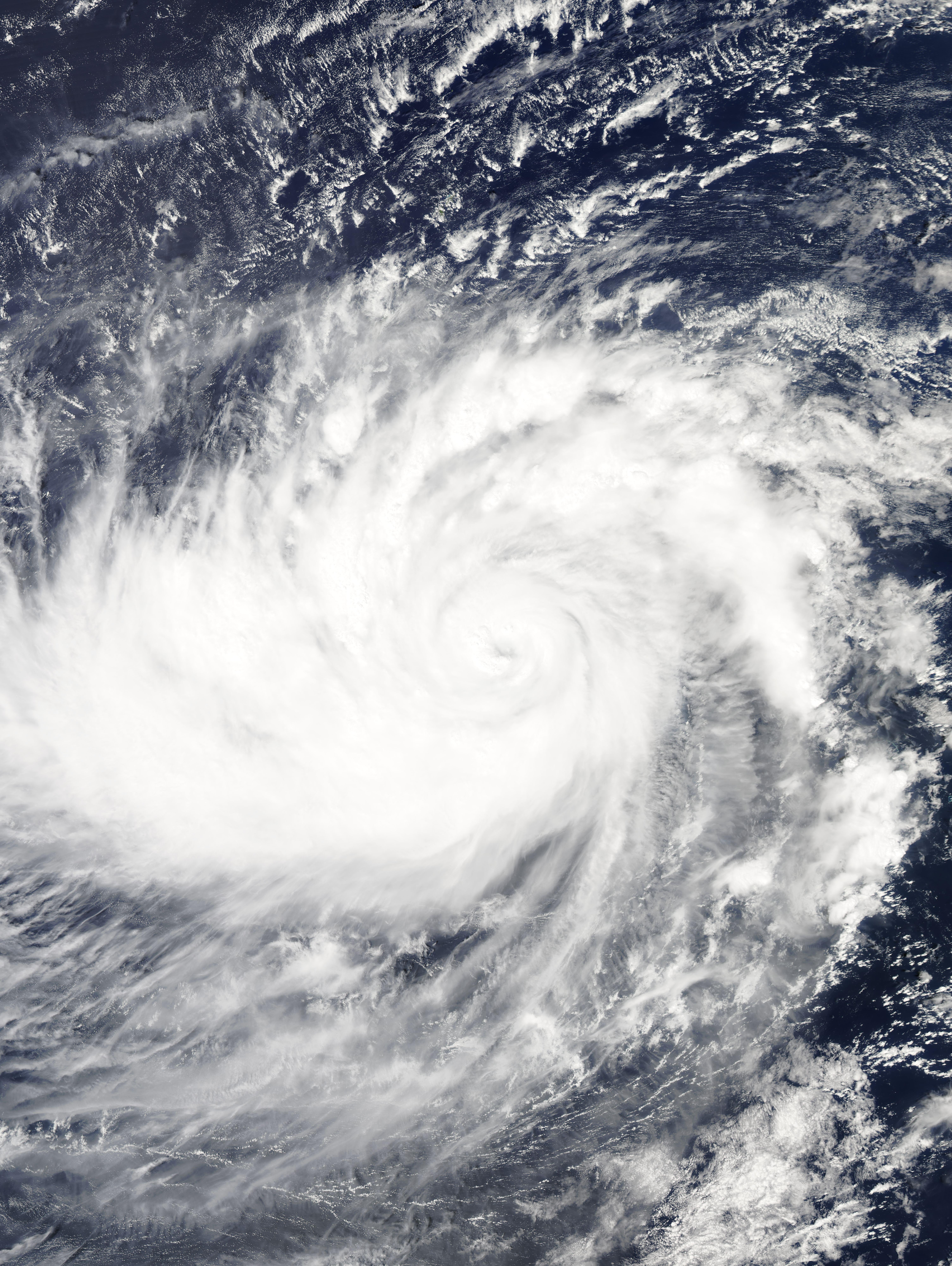
Typhoon Wutip coursing through Yap and Chuuk State on February 22

The National Weather Service (NWS) office in Tiyan, Guam released 3 Special Weather Statements on February 17 and 19 for Chuuk, Pohnpei, and Kosrae States as the pre-Wutip disturbance (later Tropical Depression 02W) approached the island nation. During the latter day, tropical storm warnings were issued for Nukuoro, Lukinor, Losap, and Chuuk Lagoon, and tropical storm watches were placed for Fananu, Puluwat, Ulul, and Satawal; the watches for Puluwat and Satawal were later upgraded to typhoon watches the same day. On February 20, the watches across Puluwat, Fanunu, and Ulul were raised to warnings, and a typhoon watch was issued for Faraulep, after the tropical depression had intensified into Tropical Storm Wutip, with forecasts stating that Wutip would soon strengthen into a typhoon. Satawal's watch became a warning as Nukuoro's advisory was canceled. A tropical storm warning was also added for Faraulep, with a tropical storm watch placed for Woleai. All advisories were later canceled from February 21 to 23. While schools, community halls, and gymnasiums were all used as shelter, some shelters did not provide food and water or proper restrooms.

Wutip passed over Chuuk, Pohnpei and Yap States with winds of more than 160 km/h (100 mph)—equivalent to a Category 2 hurricane—from February 19 to 22, and damaged or destroyed approximately 160 houses and displaced 165 people in Chuuk and Yap. In Pohnpei State, primary and secondary power lines were damaged. Besides having fallen trees, the main island of Pohnpei was entirely left without power before having it restored. The command post of Chuuk State was activated on February 20–21 under an issued executive order, as falling trees, flooding, and damage towards homes were being reported on the 21st. Displaced people were moved to typhoon shelters and also to families residing more inland, away from the shorelines. In Pattiw, 54 homes were destroyed and at least 69 were damaged. Schools were closed down as an effect of major damage as displaced families sheltered in them. In some of the affected islands of Yap, schools also sustained damage. Satellite imagery analysis after the storm revealed extensive damage to vegetation and limited damage to structures of the Northwest Islands.

The Northwest Islands and Mortlock Islands had over 90% of their crops damaged, likewise to Nukuoro of Pohnpei State; the main crop, taro, rotted and became no longer edible, though some of it was salvaged. Water sources for the outer islands of Houk, Puluwat, Tamatam and Pulap, along with the Mortlock Islands, were rendered undrinkable, contaminated by saltwater from the flooding. In Houk, sea water flooding killed vegetation, including taro, breadfruit and coconut—the main diet for the inhabitants besides fish. Wutip flooded a taro plantation in Oneop and downed breadfruit and banana trees with its winds. Structures there were unroofed and one structure had collapsed. Across the state of Yap, infrastructure, including dispensaries, and crops were damaged. Residents of Satawal, Lamotrek, Elato, Faraulep, and Piig necessitated water assistance, as their drinking sources were soon to be exhausted. Despite no casualties, Wutip ruined many crops with the saltwater floods it produced and, with the water sources contaminated, induced a high possibility of disease outbreaks in the affected areas. Overall, Wutip caused heavy preliminary damage in infrastructure and agriculture that cost at least $2 million.

=== Guam ===
Radar imagery of Typhoon Wutip approaching the Mariana Islands on February 23

The NWS announced a tropical storm watch for Guam on February 20; it was upgraded to a warning on February 22, before being canceled two days later. Guam was still reeling from Typhoon Mangkhut in the previous year as hundreds fled to emergency shelters; over 430 children and adults sought refuge at five different emergency shelters. Public schools were closed in preparation of Wutip on February 22. The same day, Cope North, an annual military exercise that takes place around Guam, was paused "as a precautionary measure due to hazardous and potentially damaging winds," according to the Pacific Air Forces. The NWS also upgraded the watch to a tropical storm warning on that day. A team of 18 from the Federal Emergency Management Agency (FEMA) assisted Guam with emergencies. Civil defense officials warned Guam residents that winds between 64–72 km/h (40–45 mph) and rainfall up to 15.24 cm (6.00 in) were expected, and advised them to stay indoors until the storm had passed. Lieutenant Governor Josh Tenorio put Guam and the military bases under Condition of Readiness (COR) 2, before upgrading it to COR 1. About 25 flights to and from Guam were canceled, leading to the loss of 4,993 seats.

As Wutip's rainbands began affecting the island, a heavy outer rainband remained largely in place over the southern side for several hours, and exhibited the meteorology phenomena training. Wutip was the first typhoon to affect Guam in the month of February since Typhoon Irma in 1953. On February 23, Antonio B. Won Pat International Airport recorded 107 mm (4.21 in) of rain from the storm, resulting in a flash flood warning being announced, while also setting a record for that date. The Guam Power Authority reported isolated power outages occurring across Guam. Wutip made its closest point of approach on the 24th, when it was about 266 kilometers (165 mi) southwest of the island. Wutip dumped 430 mm (17 in) of rain in Inarajan, 300 mm (12 in) in Dandan, and 150 to 200 mm (6 to 8 in) elsewhere on the island. Maximum sustained winds of 65–70 km/h (40–45 mph) and gusts of 115 km/h (70 mph) persisted throughout the night into early February 25, as seas remained hazardous. In Santa Rita, manholes were overflowed by flooding. Merizo also endured inundation, though it was noted as "nothing too bad" by its mayor's office. Inarajan experienced more significant damage, with obstructed roads and many downed trees and power lines along with major flooding. Preliminary damage in infrastructure for Wutip totaled over $1.3 million. No injuries or serious damages were reported, and the COR 1 was canceled by the lieutenant governor along with brigadier general Gentry Boswell, placing Guam under COR 4, the normal condition of readiness. The Guam Department of Education later reopened all of its 41 schools.

=== Northern Mariana Islands ===
Tropical storm watches were in effect across the islands of Saipan, Tinian, and Rota. Families were still residing in tents due to the effects from Typhoon Yutu of last year, and were encouraged to seek emergency shelter; a total of 83 individuals took shelter during Wutip's passage. President of the Asian Football Confederation, Salman bin Ibrahim Al Khalifa, was set to visit Saipan on February 25, but postponed the visit in precaution of Wutip. The tropical storm watch in Rota was later upgraded to a typhoon warning but was canceled by Lieutenant Governor Arnold Palacios on February 24, when Wutip headed towards a different direction from the islands and no longer posed a threat. Winds of 55–70 km/h (35–45 mph) and gusts of 70–90 km/h (45–55 mph) swept across the village of Songsong and waves of 4.9–6.1 m (16–20 ft) to as high as 7.6 m (25 ft) surfed along the east- and south-facing reefs, leading to coastal flooding. No injuries were reported, and public roadways across the islands remained clear of debris. As a result, schools were reopened across the Mariana Islands on February 25. Palacios stated that climate change is a reality as demonstrated by Wutip, for the typhoon season for the region was not until another month.

== Aftermath ==
=== Federated States of Micronesia ===
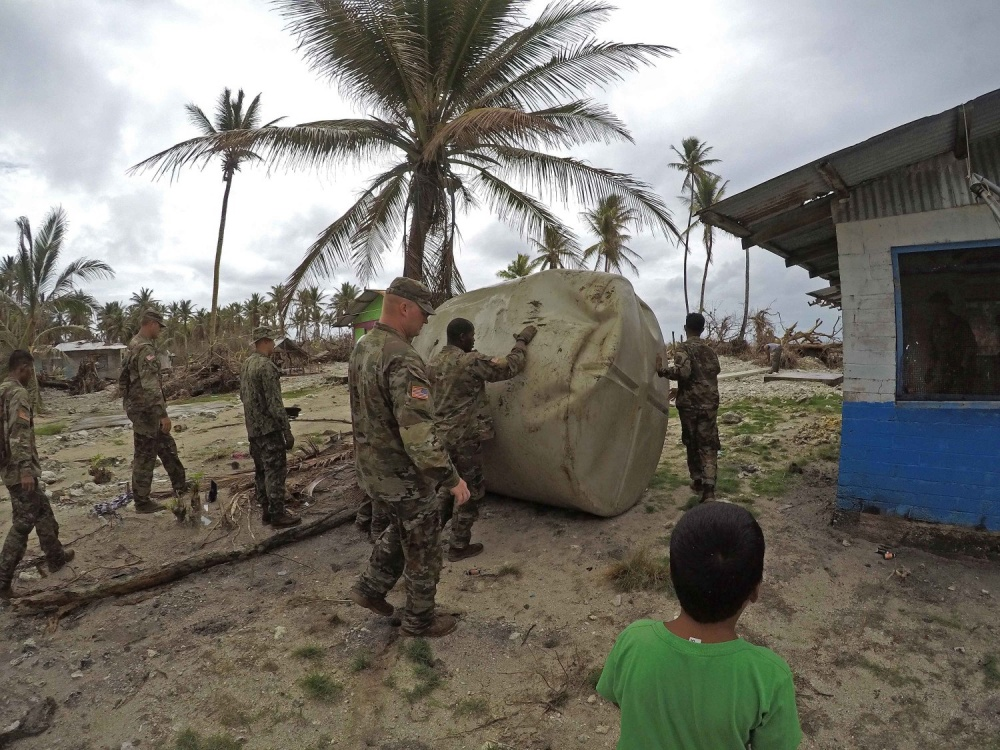
U.S. Army soldiers at the Lower Mortlock Islands of Chuuk State moving a water tank as part of Pacific Partnership 2019

The Governor of Chuuk Johnson Elimo and the Governor of Yap Henry Falan both declared a state of emergency on February 22, in addition to a declaration from the President of the Federated States of Micronesia Peter M. Christian. On February 26, a team of 13 from the government of Chuuk was deployed at Pattiw to supply food and water, with the support of the International Organization for Migration (IOM) and the Red Cross. Elimo later revised his declaration on March 2, emphasizing the extensive damages Wutip had caused to infrastructure, food crops, and water sources. Damage assessments were commenced throughout the affected areas. On March 11, FSM President Christian issued a disaster declaration and requested international assistance, releasing $100,000 from the country's emergency fund. U.S. Chargé d'affaires Heather Coble declared a disaster the following day, allowing the United States Agency for International Development (USAID), FEMA, and the federal government of the FSM to initiate a damage assessment and relieve activities supporting agriculture and food security.

The damage assessment took place from March 18 to April 4, with assistance from the IOM. It found along with infrastructure damage, that agriculture production was damaged across 30 islands, leaving 11,575 people food insecure. Shipments containing rice, vegetables, and cooking oil were sent to the Mortlock Islands of Chuuk State. Approximately $450,000 from USAID's Office of Foreign Disaster Assistance, New Zealand Embassy, and Australian Aid, was mobilized to contribute efforts and for purchasing food baskets, aiding 9,295 people and the other 2,280 who suffered moderate crop damage. On March 31, a multinational team aboard USNS Brunswick arrived at the Lower Mortlock Islands to support recovery efforts as part of Pacific Partnership 2019. Because of their Compact of Free Association between the national governments, U.S. President Donald Trump declared Wutip a disaster on May 7, making funding for emergency relief and reconstruction assistance available, after Christian had requested a disaster declaration on April 17. With this funding, the Catholic Relief Services provided agricultural rehabilitation and the IOM gave food assistance to the areas affected by Wutip. The USAID division in the Philippines reconstructed 136 homes and 39 public structures. Relief and reconstruction funding from USAID totaled more than $22.3 million.

=== Guam ===
Guam Governor Lou Leon Guerrero requested a major disaster declaration on March 25, due to the impact the Mariana Islands had from Wutip during February 23–25. Between April 2–5, damage assessments were conducted around areas of Guam, determining if the damage was severe enough for the necessity of federal assistance. On May 7, Donald Trump approved the disaster declaration, and made public assistance towards Guam available for eligible local governments and certain non-profit organizations to support the relief efforts. Tracy A. Haynes was appointed by Trump as the Federal Coordinating Officer for recovery operations across Guam. FEMA gave $722,298.51 in public assistance and $146,376.80 for hazard mitigation.

== See also ==
- Weather of 2019
- Tropical cyclones in 2019
- Other systems named Wutip
- Other systems named Betty
- Typhoon Keith (1997) – A Category 5-equivalent super typhoon that affected some of the same areas in 1997
- Typhoon Maysak (2015) – The most powerful pre-April typhoon on record; struck Micronesia and the Philippines
- Typhoon Jelawat (2018) – An early-season Category 4-equivalent super typhoon from 2018, which affected some of the same areas
- Typhoon Yutu (2018) – A powerful Category 5-equivalent super typhoon that devastated Saipan and Tinian in the Northern Mariana Islands during the previous year
- Typhoon Surigae (2021) – The most powerful April typhoon on record
