= Rowan Yeats =

Canadian mathematician and mathematical physicist

- Born: 1980; Halifax, Nova Scotia

Academic background
- Education: University of Waterloo (BMath); Boston University (PhD)
- Thesis: Growth Estimates for Dyson-Schwinger Equations (2008)
- Doctoral advisor: Dirk Kreimer

Academic work
- Discipline: Mathematics, Physics
- Sub-discipline: Combinatorics; quantum field theory
- Institutions: University of Waterloo

Rowan Yeats (born 1980) is a Canadian mathematician and mathematical physicist whose research connects combinatorics to quantum field theory. He (Note: Yeats uses he/him and they/them pronouns. This article uses he/him for consistency.) holds the Canada Research Chair in Combinatorics in Quantum Field Theory at the University of Waterloo.

== Biography ==
Yeats is from Halifax, Nova Scotia. As an undergraduate at the University of Waterloo, he won an honourable mention for the 2003 Morgan Prize for his research in number theory, the theory of Lie groups, and non-standard models of arithmetic. He graduated in 2003, and went to Boston University for graduate school, where he completed his Ph.D. in 2008. His dissertation, Growth Estimates for Dyson-Schwinger Equations, was supervised by Dirk Kreimer. In 2016, Yeats was awarded a Humboldt Fellowship to visit Kreimer at the Humboldt University of Berlin.

Yeats is the author of the books Rearranging Dyson–Schwinger Equations (Memoirs of the American Mathematical Society, 2011) and A Combinatorial Perspective on Quantum Field Theory (Springer, 2017).
