= Western Islands =

Western Islands may refer to the:

- Various parts of the Caroline Islands
  - Pattiw
  - Western areas in the Caroline Islands region, being Yap, Palau, and from 1907 Saipan.
  - Faichuk, Caroline Islands, Micronesia
- Western Islands (Amsterdam)
- Western Islands (Ontario) in Georgian Bay, Ontario, Canada
- Western Islands, Singapore, West Region, Singapore
- Western Islands, Papua New Guinea, in the Bismarck Archipelago
- Western Islands (Maryland) in the Kedges Straits, Somerset County, Maryland, United States
- Outer Hebrides, Scotland, United Kingdom
- Azores, Western Islands of Portugal
- Western Islands (publisher), the publishing arm of the John Birch Society
