= Morgan Prize (disambiguation) =

The Morgan Prize in Mathematics may refer to:

- Frank and Brennie Morgan Prize for Outstanding Research in Mathematics by an Undergraduate Student awarded jointly by the American Mathematical Society, Mathematical Association of America and Society for Industrial and Applied Mathematics
- De Morgan Medal awarded by the London Mathematical Society
