= Kontorovich =

Kontorovich is a surname. Notable people with the surname include:

- Alex Kontorovich, American mathematician
- Eugene Kontorovich (born 1975), Israeli-American legal scholar
