= Eyewall replacement cycle =

Meteorological process around and within the eye of intense tropical cyclones

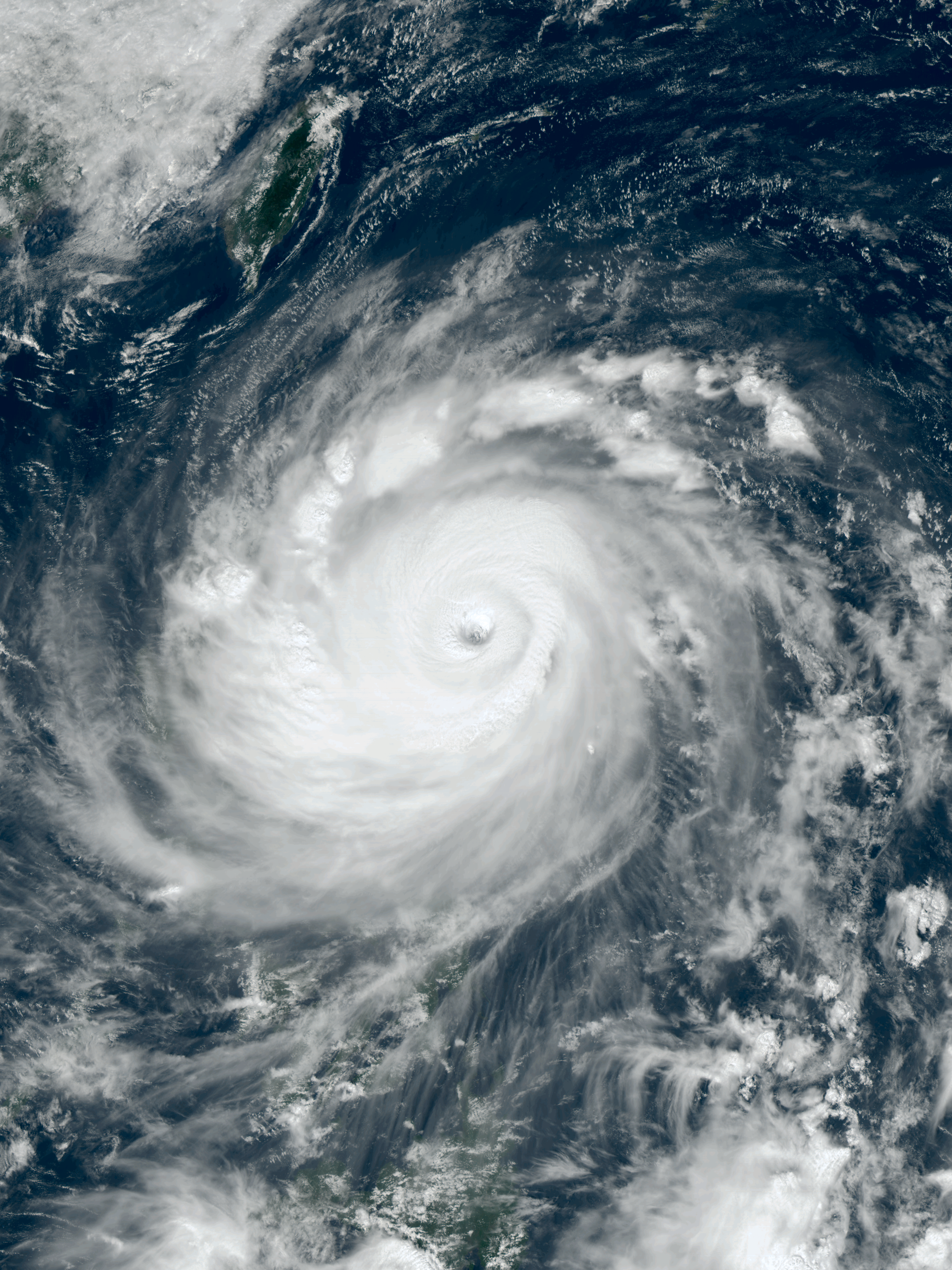
Concentric eyewalls seen in Typhoon Haima as it travels west across the Pacific Ocean.

In meteorology, an eyewall replacement cycle, also called a concentric eyewall cycle, is a process whereby some of the outer rainbands of a tropical cyclone with an eye strengthen and organize into a ring of thunderstorms—a new, outer eyewall—that slowly moves inward and robs the original, inner eyewall of its needed moisture and angular momentum. Since the strongest winds are in a tropical cyclone's eyewall, the storm usually weakens during this phase, as the inner wall is "choked" by the outer wall. Eventually the outer eyewall replaces the inner one completely, and the storm may re-intensify.

They naturally occur in intense tropical cyclones with maximum sustained winds greater than 33 m/s (64 kn; 119 km/h; 74 mph), or hurricane-force, and particularly in major hurricanes of Saffir–Simpson category 3 to 5.

The discovery of this process was partially responsible for the end of the U.S. government's hurricane modification experiment Project Stormfury. This project set out to seed clouds outside the eyewall, apparently causing a new eyewall to form and weakening the storm. When it was discovered that this was a natural process due to hurricane dynamics, the project was quickly abandoned.

Almost every intense hurricane undergoes at least one of these cycles during its existence. Recent studies have shown that nearly half of all tropical cyclones, and nearly all cyclones with sustained winds over 204 kilometres per hour (127 mph; 110 kn), undergo eyewall replacement cycles. Hurricane Allen in 1980 went through repeated eyewall replacement cycles, fluctuating between Category 5 and Category 4 status on the Saffir–Simpson scale several times. Typhoon June (1975) was the first reported case of triple eyewalls, and Hurricane Juliette and Iris (2001) were documented cases of such.

== History ==
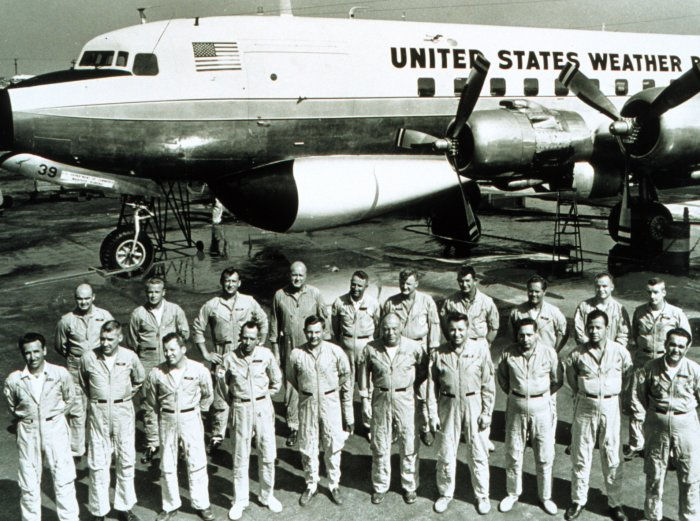
1966 photo of the crew and personnel of Project Stormfury.

The first tropical system to be observed to have concentric eyewalls was Typhoon Sarah by Fortner in 1956, which he described as "an eye within an eye". The storm was observed by a reconnaissance aircraft to have an inner eyewall with a diameter of 6 kilometres (3.7 mi) and an outer eyewall at 28 kilometres (17 mi). During a subsequent flight 8 hours later, the inner eyewall had disappeared, the outer eyewall had reduced to 16 kilometres (9.9 mi) and the maximum sustained winds and hurricane intensity had decreased. The next hurricane observed to have concentric eyewalls was Hurricane Donna in 1960. Radar from reconnaissance aircraft showed an inner eye that varied from 10 miles (16 km) in diameter at low altitude to 13 miles (21 km) near the tropopause. In between the two eyewalls was an area of clear skies that extended vertically from 3,000 feet (910 m) to 25,000 feet (7,600 m). The low-level clouds at around 3,000 feet (910 m) were described as stratocumulus with concentric horizontal rolls. The outer eyewall was reported to reach heights near 45,000 feet (14,000 m) while the inner eyewall only extended to 30,000 feet (9,100 m). 12 hours after identifying concentric eyewalls, the inner eyewall had dissipated.

Hurricane Beulah in 1967 was the first tropical cyclone to have its eyewall replacement cycle observed from beginning to end. Previous observations of concentric eyewalls were from aircraft-based platforms. Beulah was observed from the Puerto Rico land-based radar for 34 hours during which time a double eyewall formed and dissipated. It was noted that Beulah reached maximum intensity immediately prior to undergoing the eyewall replacement cycle, and that it was "probably more than a coincidence." Previous eyewall replacement cycles had been observed to decrease the intensity of the storm, but at this time the dynamics of why it occurred was not known.

As early as 1946 it was known that the introduction of carbon dioxide ice or silver iodide into clouds that contained supercooled water would convert some of the droplets into ice followed by the Bergeron–Findeisen process of growth of the ice particles at the expense of the droplets, the water of which would all end up in large ice particles. The increased rate of precipitation would result in dissipation of the storm. By early 1960, the working theory was that the eyewall of a hurricane was inertially unstable and that the clouds had a large amount of supercooled water. Therefore, seeding the storm outside the eyewall would release more latent heat and cause the eyewall to expand. The expansion of the eyewall would be accompanied with a decrease in the maximum wind speed through conservation of angular momentum.

=== Project Stormfury ===
Project Stormfury was an attempt to weaken tropical cyclones by flying aircraft into them and seeding with silver iodide. The project was run by the United States Government from 1962 to 1983.

The hypothesis was that the silver iodide would cause supercooled water in the storm to freeze, disrupting the inner structure of the hurricane. This led to the seeding of several Atlantic hurricanes. However, it was later shown that this hypothesis was incorrect. In reality, it was determined, most hurricanes do not contain enough supercooled water for cloud seeding to be effective. Additionally, researchers found that unseeded hurricanes often undergo the eyewall replacement cycles that were expected from seeded hurricanes. This finding called Stormfury's successes into question, as the changes reported now had a natural explanation.

The last experimental flight was flown in 1971, due to a lack of candidate storms and a changeover in NOAA's fleet. More than a decade after the last modification experiment, Project Stormfury was officially canceled. Although Project Stormfury did not achieve its goal in reducing the destructiveness of hurricanes, the observational data and storm lifecycle research generated by Stormfury helped improve meteorologists' ability to forecast the movement and intensity of future hurricanes.

== Secondary eyewalls ==
=== Identification ===
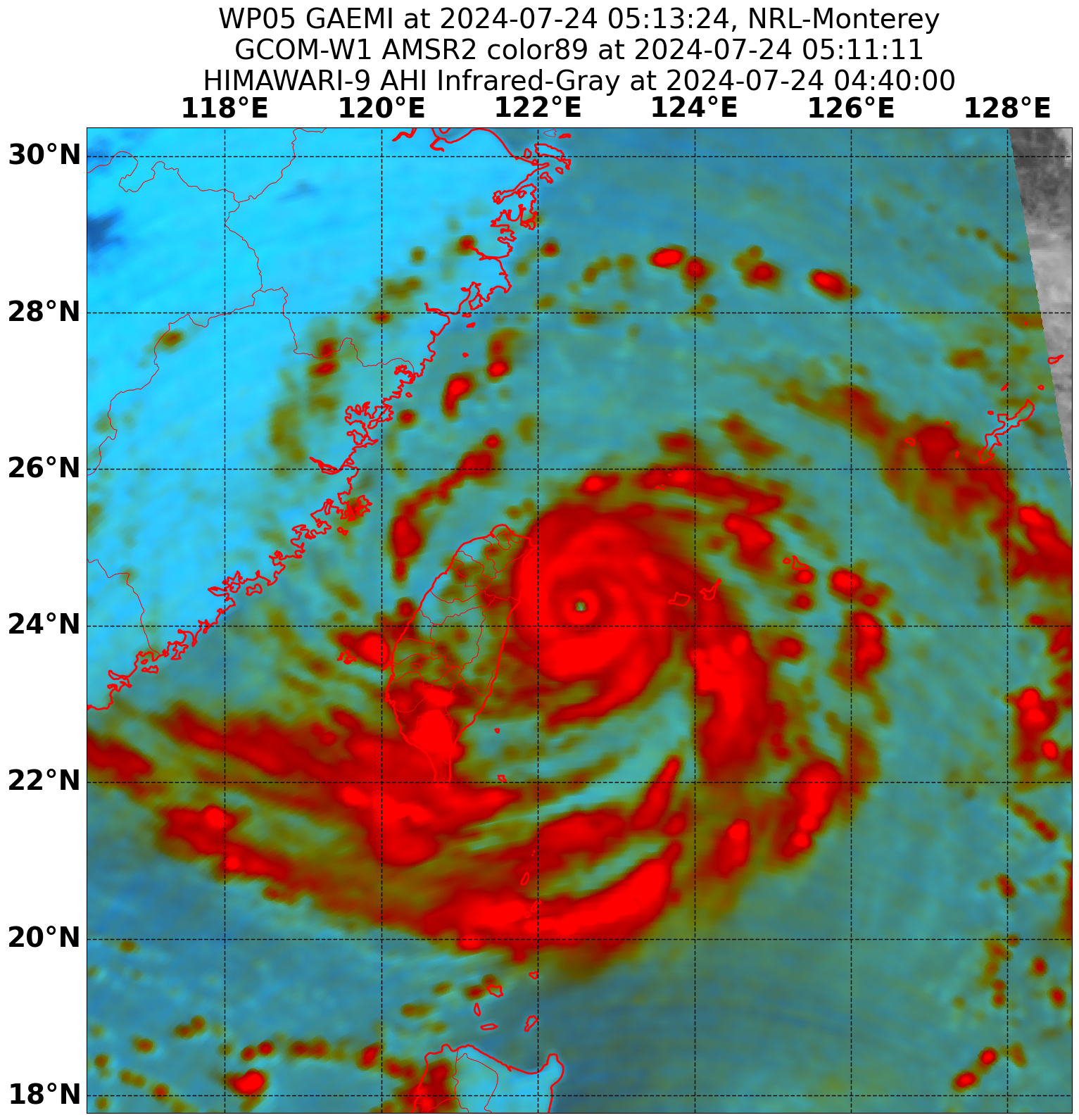
Microwave satellite imagery of Typhoon Gaemi undergoing an eyewall replacement cycle while approaching the northeastern coast of Taiwan

Qualitatively identifying secondary eyewalls is easy for a hurricane analyst to do. It involves looking at satellite or radar imagery and seeing if there are two concentric rings of enhanced convection. The outer eyewall is generally almost circular and concentric with the inner eyewall. Quantitative analysis is more difficult since there exists no objective definition of what a secondary eyewall is. Kossin et al. specified that the outer ring had to be visibly separated from the inner eye with at least 75% closed with a moat region clear of clouds.

While secondary eyewalls have been seen as a tropical cyclone is nearing land, none have been observed while the eye is not over the ocean. Changes in the intensity of strong hurricanes such as Katrina, Ophelia, and Rita occurred simultaneously with eyewall replacement cycles and comprised interactions between the eyewalls, rainbands and outside environments. Eyewall replacement cycles, such as occurred in Rita as it approached the Gulf Coast of the United States, can greatly increase the size of tropical cyclones while simultaneously decreasing their strength.

During the period from 1997 to 2006, 45 eyewall replacement cycles were observed in the tropical North Atlantic Ocean, 12 in the Eastern North Pacific and two in the Western North Pacific. 12% of all Atlantic storms and 5% of storms in the Pacific underwent eyewall replacement during this time period. In the North Atlantic, 70% of major hurricanes had at least one eyewall replacement, compared to 33% of all storms. In the Pacific, 33% of major hurricanes and 16% of all hurricanes had an eyewall replacement cycle. Stronger storms have a higher probability of forming a secondary eyewall, with 60% of category 5 hurricanes undergoing an eyewall replacement cycle within 12 hours.

During the years 1969–1971, 93 storms reached tropical storm strength or greater in the Pacific Ocean. Eight of the 15 that reached super typhoon strength (65 m/s), 11 of the 49 storms that reached typhoon strength (33 m/s), and none of the 29 tropical storms (<33 m/s) developed concentric eyewalls. The authors note that because the reconnaissance aircraft were not specifically looking for double eyewall features, these numbers are likely underestimates.

During the years 1949–1983, 1268 typhoons were observed in the Western Pacific. Seventy-six of these had concentric eyewalls. Of all the typhoons that underwent eyewall replacement, around 60% did so only once; 40% had more than one eyewall replacement cycle, with two of the typhoons each experiencing five eyewall replacements. The number of storms with eyewall replacement cycles was strongly correlated with the strength of the storm. Stronger typhoons were much more likely to have concentric eyewalls. There were no cases of double eyewalls where the maximum sustained wind was less than 45 m/s or the minimum pressure was higher than 970 hPa. More than three-quarters of the typhoons that had pressures lower than 970 hPa developed the double eyewall feature. The majority of Western and Central Pacific typhoons that experience double eyewalls do so in the vicinity of Guam.

=== Multiple secondary eyewalls ===
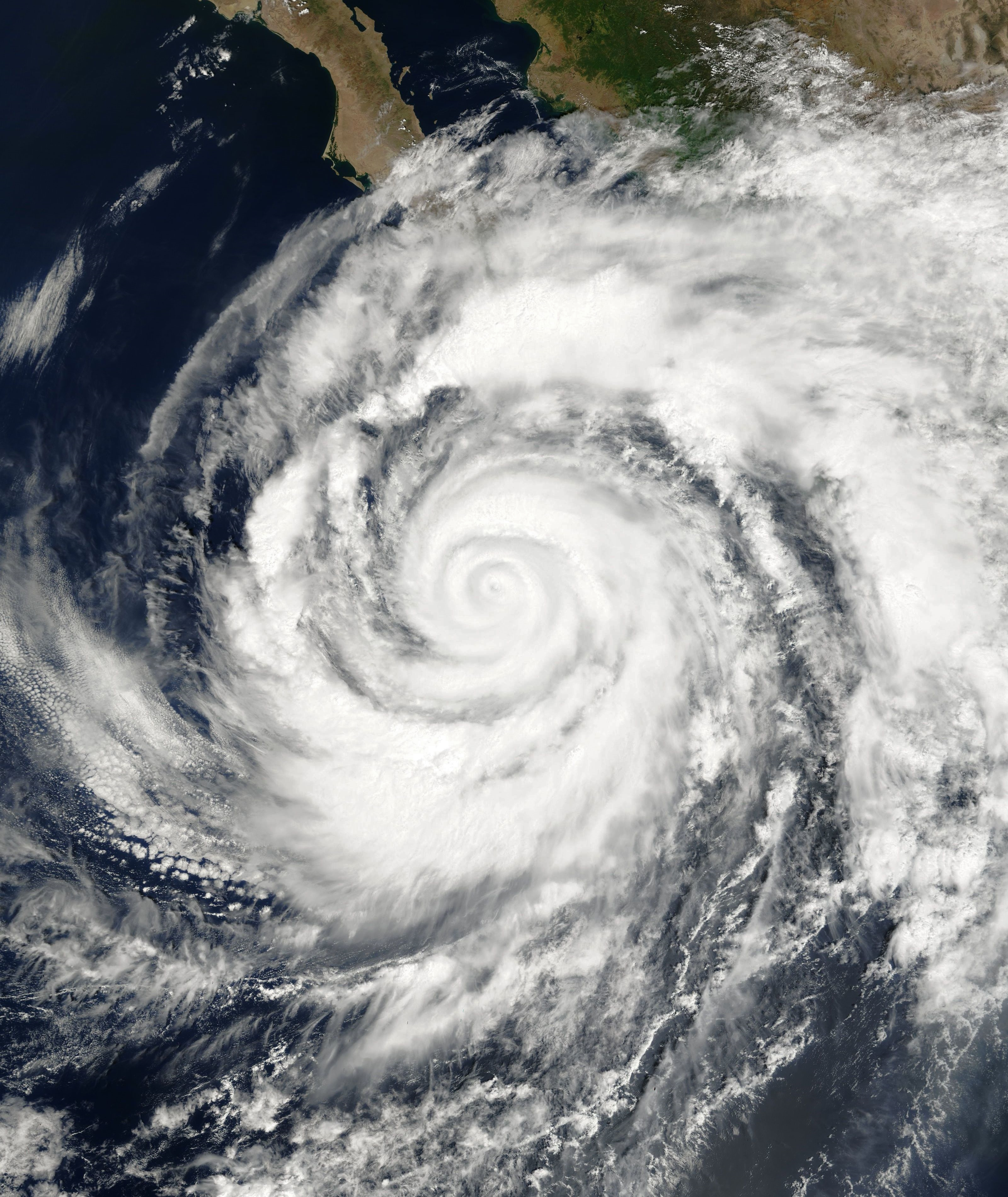
Hurricane Juliette, a rare case of triple eyewalls.

The formation of more than one secondary eyewall at the same time is a rare occurrence; two secondary eyewalls and a primary eyewall are referred to as triple eyewalls. Typhoon June (1975) was the first reported case of triple eyewalls, and Hurricane Juliette and Iris (2001) were documented cases of such.

== Secondary eyewall formation ==
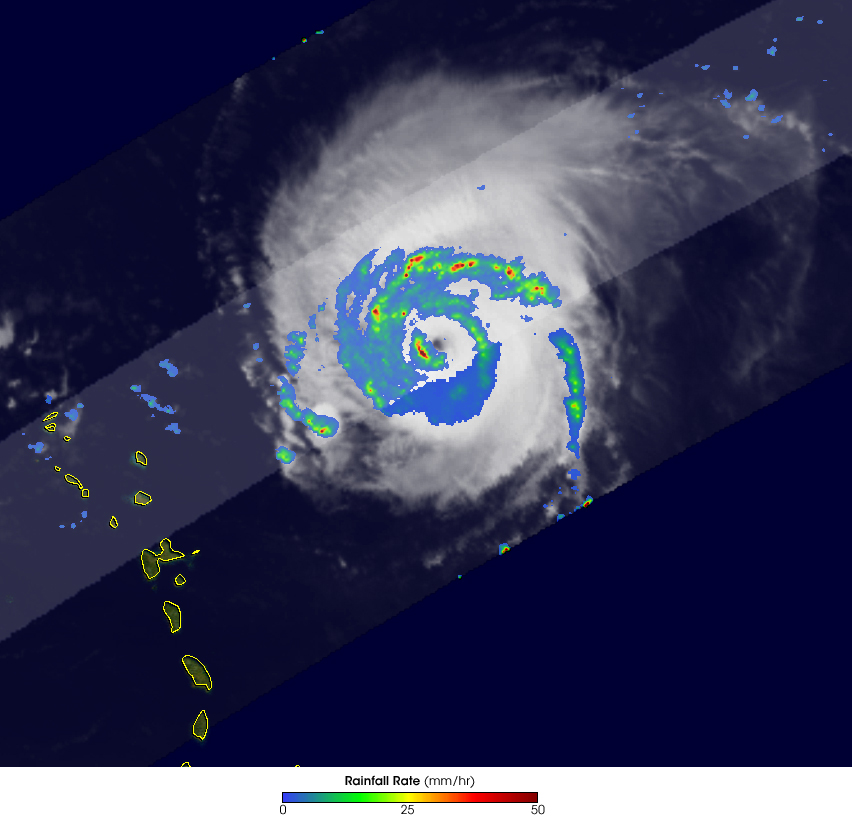
Imagery from the Tropical Rainfall Measuring Mission shows the beginning of an eyewall replacement cycle in Hurricane Frances.

Secondary eyewalls were once considered a rare phenomenon. Since the advent of reconnaissance airplanes and microwave satellite data, it has been observed that over half of all major tropical cyclones develop at least one secondary eyewall. There have been many hypotheses that attempt to explain the formation of secondary eyewalls. The reason why hurricanes develop secondary eyewalls is not well understood.

=== Early formation hypotheses ===
Since eyewall replacement cycles were discovered to be natural, there has been a strong interest in trying to identify what causes them. There have been many hypotheses put forth that are now abandoned. In 1980, Hurricane Allen crossed the mountainous region of Haiti and simultaneously developed a secondary eyewall. Hawkins noted this and hypothesized that the secondary eyewall may have been caused by topographic forcing. Willoughby suggested that a resonance between the inertial period and asymmetric friction may be the cause of secondary eyewalls. Later modeling studies and observations have shown that outer eyewalls may develop in areas uninfluenced by land processes.

There have been many hypotheses suggesting a link between synoptic scale features and secondary eyewall replacement. It has been observed that radially inward traveling wave-like disturbances have preceded the rapid development of tropical disturbances to tropical cyclones. It has been hypothesized that this synoptic scale internal forcing could lead to a secondary eyewall. Rapid deepening of the tropical low in connection with synoptic scale forcing has been observed in multiple storms, but has been shown to not be a necessary condition for the formation of a secondary eyewall. The wind-induced surface heat exchange (WISHE) is a positive feedback mechanism between the ocean and atmosphere in which a stronger ocean-to-atmosphere heat flux results in a stronger atmospheric circulation, which results in a strong heat flux. WISHE has been proposed as a method of generating secondary eyewalls. Later work has shown that while WISHE is a necessary condition to amplify disturbances, it is not needed to generate them.

=== Vortex Rossby wave hypothesis ===
In the vortex Rossby wave hypothesis, the waves travel radially outward from the inner vortex. The waves amplify angular momentum at a radius that is dependent on the radial velocity matching that of the outside flow. At this point, the two are phase-locked and allow the coalescence of the waves to form a secondary eyewall.

=== β-skirt axisymmetrization hypothesis ===
In a fluid system, β (beta) is the spatial, usually horizontal, change in the environmental vertical vorticity. β is maximized in the eyewall of a tropical cyclone. The β-skirt axisymmetrization (BSA) assumes that a tropical cyclone about to develop a secondary eye will have a decreasing, but non-negative β that extends from the eyewall to approximately 50 kilometres (30 mi) to 100 kilometres (60 mi) from the eyewall. In this region, there is a small, but important β. This area is called the β-skirt. Outward of the skirt, β is effectively zero.

Convective available potential energy (CAPE) is the amount of energy a parcel of air would have if lifted a certain distance vertically through the atmosphere. The higher the CAPE, the more likely there will be convection. If areas of high CAPE exist in the β-skirt, the deep convection that forms would act as a source of vorticity and turbulence kinetic energy. This small-scale energy will upscale into a jet around the storm. The low-level jet focuses the stochastic energy a nearly axisymmetric ring around the eye. Once this low-level jet forms, a positive feedback cycle such as WISHE can amplify the initial perturbations into a secondary eyewall.

== Death of the inner eyewall ==
Typhoon Ragasa completing an eyewall replacement cycle

When the secondary eyewall totally surrounds the inner eyewall, it begins to affect the tropical cyclone dynamics. Tropical cyclones are fuelled by the high ocean temperature. Sea surface temperatures immediately underneath a tropical cyclone can be several degrees cooler than those at the periphery of a storm; cyclones depend on receiving energy from the ocean transported by the inward spiralling winds. When an outer eyewall is formed, the moisture and angular momentum necessary for the maintenance of the inner eyewall is now being used to sustain the outer eyewall, causing the inner eye to weaken and dissipate, leaving the tropical cyclone with one eye that is larger in diameter than the previous eye.

In the moat region between the inner and outer eyewall, observations by dropsondes have shown high temperatures and dewpoint depressions. The eyewall contracts because of inertial instability. Contraction of the eyewall occurs if the area of convection occurs outside the radius of maximum winds. After the outer eyewall forms, subsidence increases rapidly in the moat region.

Once the inner eyewall dissipates, the storm weakens: the central pressure increases and the maximum sustained windspeed decreases. Rapid changes in the intensity of tropical cyclones is a typical characteristic of eyewall replacement cycles. Compared to the processes involved with the formation of the secondary eyewall, the death of the inner eyewall is fairly well understood.

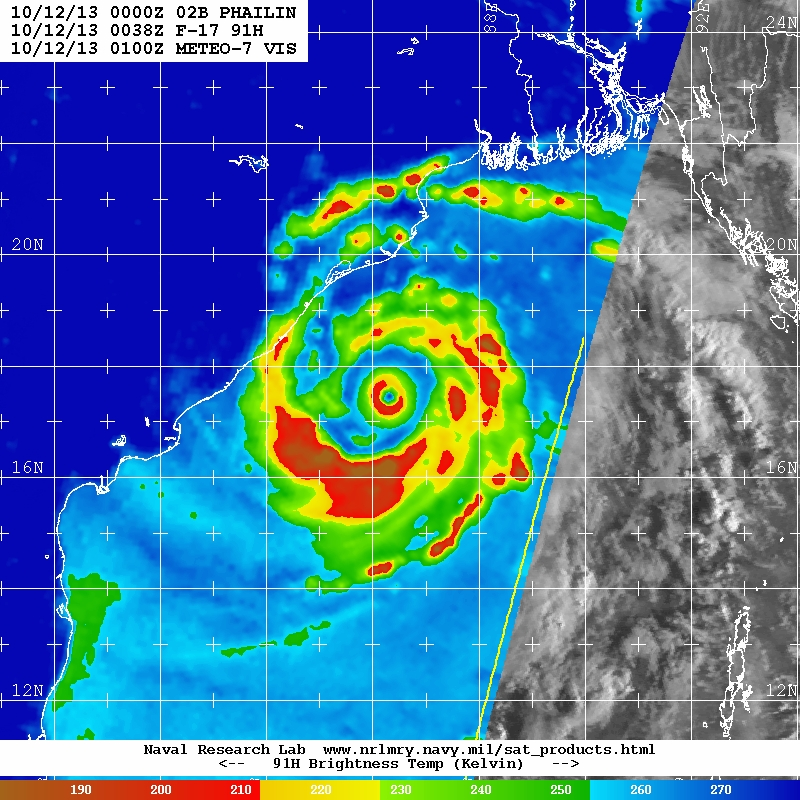
A microwave pass of Cyclone Phailin revealing the moat between the inner and outer eyewalls.

Some tropical cyclones with extremely large outer eyewalls do not experience the contraction of the outer eye and subsequent dissipation of the inner eye. Typhoon Winnie (1997) developed an outer eyewall with a diameter of 200 nautical miles (370 km) that did not dissipate until it reached the shoreline. The time required for the eyewall to collapse is inversely related to the diameter of the eyewall which is mostly because inward directed wind decreases asymptotically to zero with distance from the radius of maximum winds, but also due to the distance required to collapse the eyewall.

Throughout the entire vertical layer of the moat, there is dry descending air. The dynamics of the moat region are similar to the eye, while the outer eyewall takes on the dynamics of the primary eyewall. The vertical structure of the eye has two layers. The largest layer is that from the top of the tropopause to a capping layer around 700 hPa which is described by descending warm air. Below the capping layer, the air is moist and has convection with the presence of stratocumulus clouds. The moat gradually takes on the characteristics of the eye, upon which the inner eyewall can only dissipate in strength as the majority of the inflow is now being used to maintain the outer eyewall. The inner eye is eventually evaporated as it is warmed by the surrounding dry air in the moat and eye. Models and observations show that once the outer eyewall completely surrounds the inner eye, it takes less than 12 hours for the complete dissipation of the inner eyewall. The inner eyewall feeds mostly upon the moist air in the lower portion of the eye before evaporating.

== Evolution into an annular tropical cyclone ==
Annular tropical cyclones have a single eyewall that is larger and circularly symmetric. Observations show that an eyewall replacement cycle can lead to the development of an annular hurricane. While some tropical cyclones become annular without undergoing an eyewall replacement cycle, it has been hypothesized that the dynamics leading to the formation of a secondary eyewall may be similar to those needed for development of an annular eye. Typhoon Wutip (2019) and Typhoon Winnie (1997) were examples where a storm had an eyewall replacement cycle and then turned into an annular tropical cyclone. Annular tropical cyclones have been simulated that have gone through the life cycle of an eyewall replacement. The simulations show that the major rainbands will grow such that the arms will overlap, and then it spirals into itself to form a concentric eyewall. The inner eyewall dissipates, leaving a tropical cyclone with a singular large eye with no rainbands.
