= Brian Conrey =

American mathematician (born 1955)

John Brian Conrey
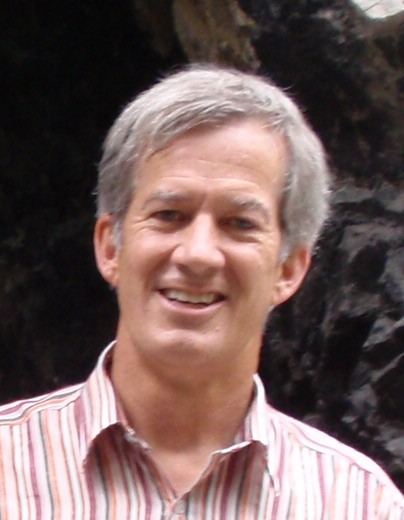
- Brian Conrey in 2009
- Born: June 23, 1955 (age 71)
- Education: University of Michigan; Santa Clara University
- Awards: Levi L. Conant Prize (2008); Fellow of the American Mathematical Society (2015)
- Scientific career
- Fields: Mathematics
- Workplaces: American Institute of Mathematics; University of Bristol
- Thesis: Zeros of Derivatives of Riemann's XI Function on the Critical Line (1980)
- Doctoral advisor: Hugh Lowell Montgomery

John Brian Conrey (June 23, 1955) is an American mathematician and the executive director of the American Institute of Mathematics. His research interests are in number theory, specifically analysis of L-functions and the Riemann zeta function.

== Education ==
Conrey received his B.S. from Santa Clara University in 1976 and received his Ph.D. at the University of Michigan in 1980 under the supervision of Hugh Lowell Montgomery.

== Career ==
Conrey is the founding executive director of the American Institute of Mathematics, a position he has held since 1997. Since 2005, he has been part-time professor at the University of Bristol, England.

He is on the editorial board of the Journal of Number Theory.

== Research ==
With Bui and Young, Conrey proved in 2011 that more than 41 percent of the zeros of the Riemann zeta function are on the critical line.

With Jonathan Keating, Nina Snaith, and others, Conrey researched correlations of eigenvalues of random unitary matrices and Riemann zeta zeros.

== Awards and honors ==
The American Mathematical Society jointly awarded him the eighth annual Levi L. Conant Prize for expository writing in 2008 for The Riemann Hypothesis. In 2015 he was elected as a Fellow of the American Mathematical Society.
