= Jonathan Keating =

British mathematician

Jonathan Keating FRS
- Born: 20 September 1963 (age 62)
- Education: University of Oxford (BA); University of Bristol (PhD)
- Scientific career
- Fields: Random matrix theory, quantum chaos, number theory, Riemann hypothesis, quantum graphs
- Workplaces: University of Manchester; University of Bristol; The Queen's College, Oxford
- Doctoral advisor: Michael Victor Berry
- Doctoral students: Nina Snaith

Jonathan Peter Keating FRS (born 20 September 1963) is a British mathematician. As of September 2019, he is the Sedleian Professor of Natural Philosophy at the University of Oxford, and from 2012 to 2019 was the Henry Overton Wills Professor of Mathematics at the University of Bristol, where he served as Dean of the Faculty of Science (2009–2013). He has made contributions to applied mathematics and mathematical physics, in particular to quantum chaos, random matrix theory and number theory.

== Education ==
He read for an MA in physics at New College, Oxford, before obtaining his PhD in 1989 at the University of Bristol supervised by Michael Berry.

== Research and career ==
He lectured in applied mathematics at the University of Manchester from 1991 to 1995 before moving to the University of Bristol, as a reader in applied mathematics (1995–1997) and then as a professor in mathematical physics (1997–2012). He served as head of the Mathematics department (2001–2004) and was appointed to the Henry Overton Wills Chair in Mathematics at Bristol in 2012. His research has focused on quantum chaos, random matrix theory and its connection to number theory, especially the theory of the Riemann zeta-function and other L-functions. He is known for his work on the resummation of semiclassical periodic orbit formulae, the statistics of quantum energy levels, quantum maps, quantum graphs, the statistics of the zeros of the Riemann zeta-function and other L-functions, and the moments of the Riemann zeta-function and other L-functions. He has served on the editorial boards of several peer reviewed scientific journals including:

- Member (1996–2004) of the editorial board of Journal of Physics A.
- Member (1997–2004) of the editorial board of Nonlinearity.
- Joint Editor-in-Chief (2004–2012) of Nonlinearity.
- Member (2003–2017) of the editorial board of Applied Mathematics Research Express.
- Member (2007–present) of the editorial board of Journal of Mathematical Physics.

He was the Chair of the Heilbronn Institute for Mathematical Research until July 2020.

In September 2019, he succeeded John M. Ball as Sedleian Professor of Natural Philosophy at the University of Oxford.

In November 2019 he succeeded Caroline Series as president of the London Mathematical Society.

His doctoral students include Nina Snaith.

== Awards and honours ==
Between 2004 and 2009 Keating was supported by an EPSRC Senior Research Fellowship.

He was elected a Fellow of the Royal Society (FRS) in 2009.

In 2010, he was awarded the London Mathematical Society's Fröhlich Prize.

In 2014, he was awarded a Royal Society Wolfson Research Merit Award.

He holds an ERC Advanced Grant.
