= American Institute of Mathematics =

Mathematical institute in the United States

American Institute of Mathematics logo

The American Institute of Mathematics (AIM) is one of nine mathematical institutes in the United States, funded by the National Science Foundation (NSF). It was founded in 1994 by John Fry, co-founder of Fry's Electronics, and originally located in the Fry's Electronics store in Palo Alto, California. It was privately funded by Fry at inception, and has obtained NSF funding since 2002. In 2014, AIM moved to a wing of Fry's corporate headquarters in San Jose, California. Since 2023, the institute has been located on the campus of the California Institute of Technology in Pasadena, California.

== History ==
The institute was founded with the primary goal of identifying and solving important mathematical problems. Originally very small groups of top mathematicians would be assembled to solve a major problem, such as the Birch and Swinnerton-Dyer conjecture. Later, the institute began running a program of week-long workshops on current topics in mathematical research. These workshops rely strongly on interactive problem sessions.

Brian Conrey became the institute's director in 1997.

The institute planned to move to Morgan Hill, California, about 39 miles (63 km) to the southeast of San Jose, when its new facility is completed. Plans for the new facility were started about 2000, but construction work was delayed by regulatory and engineering issues. In February 2014, AIM received permission to start construction of the facility, which was to be built as a facsimile of The Alhambra, a 14th-century Moorish palace and fortress in Spain, but as of August 2017, no construction activity had started.

On March 24, 2022, the institute announced its relocation to the California Institute of Technology (Caltech).

== Awards ==
From 1998 to 2009 (with the exception of 1999), AIM annually awarded a five-year fellowship to an "outstanding new PhD pursuing research in an area of pure mathematics", but currently is not offering the fellowship.

In 2018, AIM announced a new prize in mathematics: the Alexanderson Award, recognizing outstanding scholarly articles arising from AIM research activities that have been published within the past few years. The award honors Gerald L. Alexanderson, Professor at Santa Clara University and founding chair of AIM's Board of Trustees .

== See also ==
- Computer-based mathematics education
