= Guðrún Kvaran =

Icelandic academic

- Occupation: Professor emeritus
- Organization: University of Iceland

Guðrún Kvaran (born 1943) is a professor emeritus at the Faculty of Icelandic and Comparative Cultural Studies, University of Iceland, and the Árni Magnússon Institute for Icelandic Studies.

== Career ==
Guðrún Kvaran completed a matriculation examination from Menntaskólinn í Reykjavík in 1963, going on to study Icelandic at the University of Iceland that autumn. In the autumn of 1965, she began work on the University Dictionary project alongside her studies. She completed a Candidate's degree in 1969 and enrolled the same autumn in the University of Göttingen in Germany to study linguistics and comparative grammar. Alongside her studies in Germany, Guðrún was hired to oversee the Arkiv für Gewässernamen Deutschlands for the Academy of Science in Mainz. She also taught Icelandic as a second language for a few semesters.

In January 1978, Guðrún stood in as a specialist at the University Dictionary and was officially appointed to this position a year later. In January 1994, she was appointed director of the University Dictionary and held this position until 1 April 1998. After changes to the regulations at the University Dictionary, Guðrún was appointed professor at the University of Iceland Faculty of Philosophy in 2000 as well as director of the University Dictionary. She held this position until 2006, when the University Dictionary became part of a larger institute, the Árni Magnússon Institute for Icelandic Studies. Guðrún then became head of the Department of Lexicography.

During her career, Guðrún held many positions of trust within the University of Iceland. She sat on the University Council from 1990 to 1992, also serving on committees for the council. For example, she was appointed to the Science Committee in 1991 and was a member for six years. From 1999 to 2004, she sat on the grant allocation committee for the University Research Fund. From 1992, she was a board member for the Science Council, representing the rector and the University Council until the Science Council was discontinued in 1994. She was an alternate member of the board for the National Research Council of Iceland for three years, representing the Icelandic Academy of Sciences. She was also chair of the University of Iceland Promotion Committee for over a decade.

During her career, Guðrún has held many positions related to her field and written numerous academic papers for domestic and international conferences and journals, as well as having given around 200 lectures in Iceland and abroad. Her projects have primarily been focused on three areas: the history of vocabulary, loan words in Icelandic, and the study of personal names. Examples of her work in the first area include Enginn lifir orðalaust. Fáin atriði úr sögu íslensks orðaforða and Staðbundinn orðaforði í orðabók Jóns úr Grunnavík. In the second area, she has written for example Importord og afløsningsord i islandsk and Valg af ord til en islandsk fremmedordbog. The articles Áhrif Biblíunnar á íslenskar nafngjafir and Das isländische Personennamensystem are examples of her work in the third area. She also contributed to the second edition of the book Nöfn Íslendinga (Names of Icelanders). The book is updated annually electronically, most recently in 2018, and accessible on snara.is. Guðrún has also written several articles about Icelandic Biblical translations, e.g., Breytingar Guðbrands biskups á Nýja testamenti Odds Gottskálkssonar. Hverjar voru fyrirmyndirnar? A selection of Guðrún's articles were published in the commemorative volume Glíman við orðin. She presented a series on the Icelandic language for the University Dictionary on the Icelandic National Broadcasting Service. From 2005 to 2009, she collaborated on the series Vítt og breytt for the Icelandic National Broadcasting Service collecting regional dialect vocabulary and words from the spoken language. For decades, Guðrún has answered questions about the Icelandic language for the University of Iceland's Web of Science site. She was president of the Icelandic Academy of Sciences from 1990 to 1996.

Guðrún has sat on many different boards and committees, including the board of the Icelandic Language Committee since 1987, which she has chaired since 2002. She has also sat on the board of the Icelandic Patriots' Society since 1987 and served as the first female president of the society since 2014.

Guðrún was editor of the journal Orð og tunga, the journal for the University Dictionary, from 1996 to 2011. Eleven issues came out during this period (3–13). As a representative of the University Dictionary, she sat on a committee for the creation of a KWIC index for the Bible in 1981, holding the position of project manager. The work was published at the end of 1994.

Guðrún sat on the translation committee for the Old Testament from 1991 to 2007, first as vice chair and then as chair from 1992. The committee published nine introductory leaflets with books from the Old Testament that had been completed. From the beginning of 2002 until the middle of 2007, she also sat on the translation committee for the New Testament. One introductory leaflet was published with all the texts of the New Testament. The entire Bible was then published in 2007: the Old Testament, the Apocrypha and the New Testament. Guðrún was involved in the translation all the way to the end and presented it in lectures.

Guðrún worked on a project composing one of three handbooks on the Icelandic language, funded by a grant from the Independence Fund. The book focuses on morphology and vocabulary. It was published in 2005.

== Awards ==
Guðrún has received various nominations and awards for her work. She was selected as an honorary member of the Society for Icelandic Studies on its 60th anniversary in April 2007. She was awarded the Knight's Cross of the Order of the Falcon on 17 June 2007 for her work in lexicography and study of the Icelandic language. She was nominated for the Icelandic Literary Prize in 1991 for the book Nöfn Íslendinga, along with Sigurður Jónsson from Arnarvatn. She was nominated for the Icelandic Literary Prize in 2005 for the work Íslensk tunga I-III, along with Höskuldur Þráinsson and Kristján Árnason.

== Personal life ==
Guðrún's parents were Guðrún Vilhjálmsdóttir Kvaran (1921–2008), housewife, and Böðvar E. Kvaran (1919–2002), managing director. Guðrún is married to the physicist Jakob Yngvason, professor emeritus at the University of Vienna. They have two children.
