= Kerry Emanuel =

American professor of meteorology

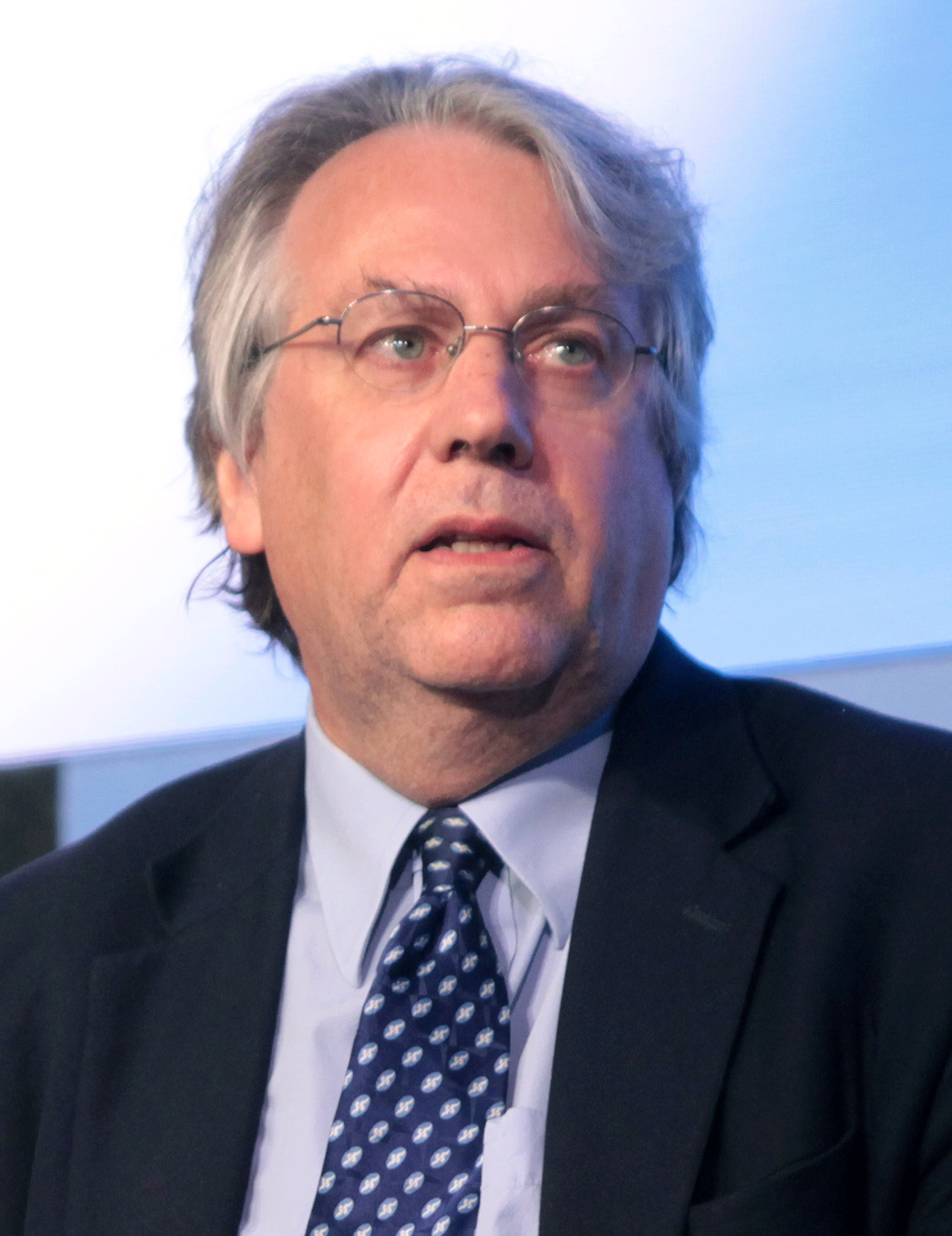
- Emanuel in 2016
- Born: April 21, 1955 (age 71)
- Citizenship: American
- Education: Massachusetts Institute of Technology
- Known for: Dynamics, hurricanes
- Awards: Carl-Gustaf Rossby Research Medal
- Scientific career
- Fields: Meteorology
- Workplaces: Massachusetts Institute of Technology
- Thesis: Inertial stability and mesoscale convective systems (1978)
- Doctoral advisor: Jule Charney
- Website: eapsweb.mit.edu/people/kokey

Kerry Andrew Emanuel (born April 21, 1955) is an American professor of meteorology currently working at the Massachusetts Institute of Technology in Cambridge. In particular he has specialized in atmospheric convection and the mechanisms acting to intensify hurricanes.

== Research ==
He hypothesized in 1994 about a superpowerful type of hurricane which could be formed if average sea surface temperature increased another 15C more than it's ever been (see "hypercane").

In a March 2008 paper published in the Bulletin of the American Meteorological Society, he put forward the conclusion that global warming is likely to increase the intensity but decrease the frequency of hurricane and cyclone activity. Gabriel Vecchi, of NOAA said of Emanuel's announcement, "While his results don't rule out the possibility that global warming has contributed to the recent increase in activity in the Atlantic, they suggest that other factors—possibly in addition to global warming—are likely to have been substantial contributors to the observed increase in activity."

== Lorenz Center ==
Along with Daniel Rothman, Emanuel co-founded the MIT Lorenz Center in 2011, named for Edward N. Lorenz.

== 2012 threats ==
In 2012, Emanuel served as keynote speaker for a conference for Republican voters concerned about climate change. Following the conference, the blog Climate Depot posted Emanuel's email address. After the conference and the exposure of Emanuel's email address on blogs, Emanuel received a large volume of emails "laced with menacing language, expletives, and personal threats of violence," according to editor James West of Mother Jones.

== Nuclear power views ==
In 2013, with other leading experts, he was co-author of an open letter to policy makers, which stated that "continued opposition to nuclear power threatens humanity's ability to avoid dangerous climate change."

== Recognition ==
He was named one of the Time 100 influential people of 2006. In 2007, he was elected as a member of the U.S. National Academy of Sciences. He was elected a Member of the American Philosophical Society in 2019. He was elected a Foreign Member of the Royal Society in 2020.

== See also ==
- Wind-induced surface heat exchange

== Selected publications ==
- Emanuel, K.A.(1994): Atmospheric Convection, Oxford University Press. ISBN 0-19-506630-8
- Emanuel, K.A.(2005): Divine Wind: The History And Science Of Hurricanes, ISBN 0-19-514941-6
- Emanuel, K.A.(2005): "Increasing destructiveness of tropical cyclones over the past 30 years". Nature
- Emanuel, K.A.(2007): Phaeton’s Reins - The human hand in climate change. Boston Review.
- Emanuel, K.A.(2007): What We Know About Climate Change, The MIT Press & Boston Review. ISBN 978-0-262-05089-0
- Emanuel, K.A.(2008): "Hurricanes and Global Warming: Results from Downscaling IPCC AR4 Simulations". Bulletin of the American Meteorological Society
