= Hans-Jürgen Borchers =

German physicist

Hans-Jürgen Borchers (24 January 1926, Hamburg – 10 September 2011, Göttingen) was a German mathematical physicist at the Georg-August-Universität Göttingen who worked on operator algebras and quantum field theory. He introduced Borchers algebras and the Borchers commutation relations and Borchers classes in quantum field theory. He was awarded the Max Planck Medal in 1994. Among his students is Jakob Yngvason.

== Selected publications ==
- Borchers, Hans-Jürgen (1961). "Über die Vollständigkeit lorentzinvarianter Felder in einer zeitartigen Röhre." Il Nuovo Cimento 19, no. 4: 787-793.
- Borchers, Hans-Jürgen (1964). "Field operators as C∞ functions in spacelike directions." Il Nuovo Cimento 33, no. 6: 1600-1613.
- Borchers, Hans-Jürgen (1992). "The CPT-theorem in two-dimensional theories of local observables." Communications in Mathematical Physics 143, no. 2: 315-332. URL: https://doi.org/10.1007/BF02099011.
- Borchers, Hans-Jürgen (1998). "Half-Sided Translations and the Type of von Neumann Algebras." Letters in Mathematical Physics 44, no. 4: 283-290. URL: https://doi.org/10.1023/A:1007400109519.
- Borchers, Hans-Jürgen (1998). "On Poincaré Transformations and the Modular Group of the Algebra Associated with a Wedge." Letters in Mathematical Physics 46, no. 4: 295-301. URL: https://doi.org/10.1023/A:1007558826047
- Borchers, Hans-Jürgen (1996), Translation group and particle representations in quantum field theory, Lecture Notes in Physics. New Series m: Monographs, vol. 40, Berlin, New York: Springer-Verlag, doi:10.1007/978-3-540-49954-1, ISBN 978-3-540-61140-0, MR 1401343
