= Jakob Yngvason =

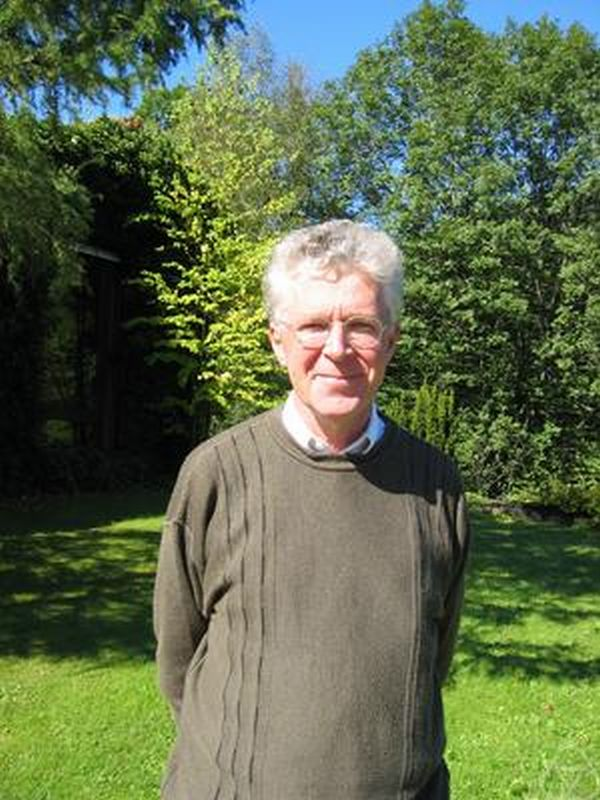
- Born: 23 November 1945 (age 80); Reykjavík
- Education: Göttingen University
- Known for: Quantum field theory Thermodynamics; Adiabatic accessibility
- Awards: Levi L. Conant Prize (2002)
- Scientific career
- Fields: Mathematical Physics, Physics
- Workplaces: University of Vienna
- Doctoral advisor: Hans-Jürgen Borchers

Jakob Yngvason (born 23 November 1945) is an Icelandic/Austrian physicist and emeritus professor of mathematical physics at the University of Vienna. He has made important contributions to local quantum field theory, thermodynamics, and the quantum theory of many-body systems, in particular cold atomic gases and Bose–Einstein condensation. He is co-author, together with Elliott H. Lieb, Jan Philip Solovej and Robert Seiringer, of a monograph on Bose gases.

== Career ==
After graduating from high school in 1964 in Reykjavík, Yngvason studied physics at Göttingen University, obtaining his Diploma in physics in 1969, and a doctorate (dr.rer.nat) in 1973. His thesis advisor was Hans-Jürgen Borchers. Yngvason was assistant professor at the University of Göttingen, 1973–1978, 1978–1985 research scientist at the Science Institute of the University of Iceland, and during 1985–1996 professor of theoretical physics at the University of Iceland. In 1996, he became professor of mathematical physics at the University of Vienna, where he has been emeritus professor since October 2014. He was president of the Erwin Schrödinger Institute for Mathematical Physics (ESI) in Vienna, 1998-2003, and scientific director of the institute 2004–2011. He was vice-president of the International Association of Mathematical Physics, 2000–2005, and editor-in-chief of Reviews in Mathematical Physics, 2006-2010. He is a member of the Societas Scientiarum Islandica and corresponding member of the Academy of Sciences in Göttingen and the Royal Danish Academy of Science and Letters, Copenhagen.

For their theoretical work in thermodynamics, Yngvason and Lieb received the Levi Conant Prize of the American Mathematical Society in 2002, for a paper on the mathematical explanation of the second law of thermodynamics. In 2004, he received the Erwin Schrödinger Prize of the Austrian Academy of Sciences.

== Personal life ==
Yngvason is married to Guðrún Kvaran, professor of lexicography at the University of Iceland; they have two children.
