= Joshua Evan Greene =

American mathematician (born 1981)

Joshua Greene
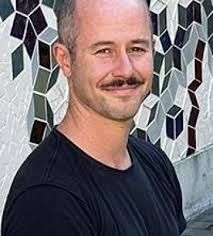
- Greene outside the Simons-Laufer Mathematical Sciences Institute
- Born: 1981 (age 44–45)
- Education: Princeton University (PhD); University of Chicago (MSc); Harvey Mudd College (BSc)
- Known for: Low-dimensional topology
- Awards: Frontiers of Science Award (2025); Levi L. Conant Prize (2023); Morgan Prize (2002)
- Scientific career
- Fields: Mathematics, geometric topology
- Workplaces: Boston College; Columbia University
- Thesis: Donaldson's Theorem, Heegaard Floer Homology, and Results on Knots (2009)
- Doctoral advisor: Zoltán Szabó
- Website: sites.google.com/bc.edu/joshua-e-greene

Joshua Evan Greene (born in 1981) is a mathematician whose primary area of research is low-dimensional topology. He is a professor at Boston College. Greene solved the lens space realization problem, while he and a co-author have made advances in the understanding of the inscribed square problem.

== Education and career ==
Greene completed his undergraduate studies at Harvey Mudd College and at the University of Chicago. He received his PhD in mathematics from Princeton University in 2009, with Zoltán Szabó as advisor (thesis: Donaldson's Theorem, Heegaard Floer Homology, and Results on Knots).

After completing his doctoral degree, Greene worked as a NSF Postdoctoral Fellow from 2009 to 2011 at Columbia University. Greene is currently a professor at Boston College.

== Mathematical work ==
In early work, Greene solved the lens space realization problem for knot surgery.

In 2020, together with Andrew Lobb, Greene proved the rectangular peg conjecture. Later they resolved the cyclic quadrilateral peg problem

== Awards and honors ==
Greene was awarded the 2002 Morgan Prize for his simple topological proof of Kneser's conjecture. He received the Levi L. Conant Prize in 2023 for his article in the Notices of the American Mathematical Society. His work was featured in the 2021 Current Events Bulletin of the American Mathematical Society. He was a 2024 Simons Fellow in mathematics. Together with Andrew Lobb, in 2025 Greene won a Frontiers of Science Award for their work resolving the rectangular peg problem.

== Selected publications ==
- Greene, Joshua; Lobb, Andrew (2023). "Cyclic quadrilaterals and smooth Jordan curves". Inventiones Mathematicae. 234 (3): 931–935. arXiv:2011.05216. Bibcode:2023InMat.234..931G. doi:10.1007/s00222-023-01212-6.
- Greene, Joshua; Lobb, Andrew (2021). "The rectangular peg problem". Annals of Mathematics. 194 (4): 509–517. arXiv:2005.09193. doi:10.4007/annals.2021.194.2.4.
- Greene, Joshua (2013). "The lens space realization problem". Annals of Mathematics. 177 (2): 449–511. arXiv:1010.6257. doi:10.4007/annals.2013.177.2.3.
