= Jennifer Hom =

American mathematician

Jennifer Cheung Hom is an American mathematician whose research concerns low-dimensional topology, including Heegaard Floer homology and link concordance. She is a professor of mathematics at Georgia Tech.

== Education and career ==
Hom majored in applied physics at Columbia University, with a minor in applied mathematics, graduating magna cum laude in 2004. She became a doctoral student of Paul Melvin at the University of Pennsylvania, completing a Ph.D. in 2011 with the dissertation Heegaard Floer invariants and cabling.

She returned to Columbia University as Ritt Assistant Professor from 2011 to 2015, when she moved to Georgia Tech. She was tenured there as an associate professor in 2018.

== Recognition ==
Hom was named to the 2023 class of Fellows of the American Mathematical Society, "for contributions to low-dimensional topology, Heegaard Floer homology, and service to the mathematical community". In 2024 she was awarded the Levi L. Conant Prize of the American Mathematical Society.
