= Nina Snaith =

British mathematician

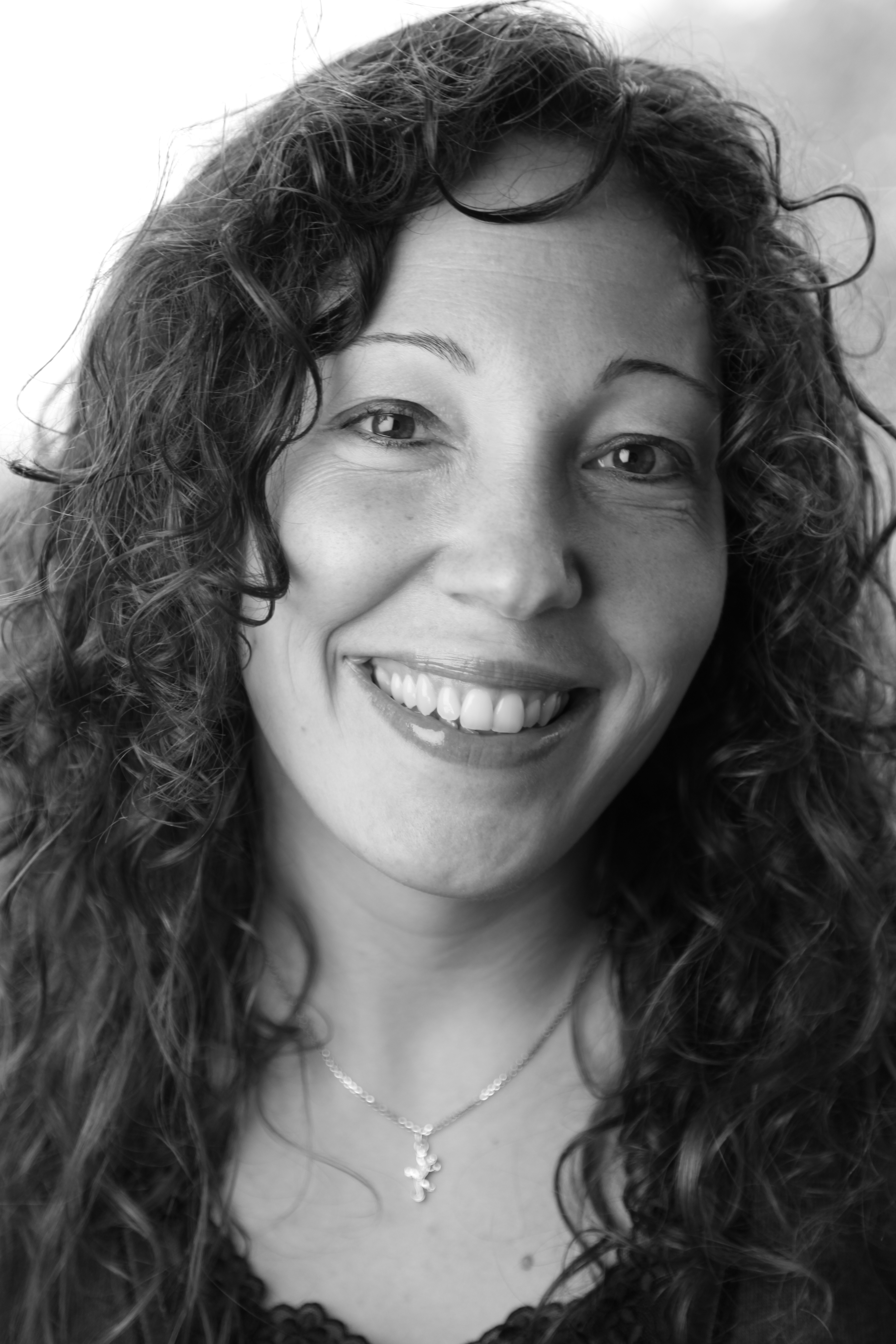
- Snaith in 2009
- Born: Nina Claire Snaith
- Awards: Suffrage Science award (2018); Whitehead Prize (2008)
- Scientific career
- Workplaces: University of Bristol
- Thesis: Random Matrix Theory and zeta functions (2000)
- Doctoral advisor: Jonathan Keating
- Website: https://people.maths.bris.ac.uk/~mancs/

Nina Claire Snaith is a British mathematician at the University of Bristol working in random matrix theory and quantum chaos.

== Education ==
Snaith was educated at the University of Bristol where she received her PhD in 2000 for research supervised by Jonathan Keating.

== Career and research ==
In 1998, Snaith and her then adviser Jonathan Keating conjectured a value for the leading coefficient of the asymptotics of the moments of the Riemann zeta function. Keating and Snaith's guessed value for the constant was based on random-matrix theory, following a trend that started with Montgomery's pair correlation conjecture. Keating's and Snaith's work extended works by Brian Conrey, Ghosh, and Gonek, also conjectural, based on number theoretic heuristics; Conrey, Farmer, Keating, Rubinstein, and Snaith later conjectured the lower terms in the asymptotics of the moments. Snaith's work appeared in her doctoral thesis Random Matrix Theory and zeta functions.

Snaith is currently Professor of Mathematical Physics at the University of Bristol.

=== Awards and honours ===
In 2008, Snaith was awarded the London Mathematical Society's Whitehead Prize.

In 2014, she delivered the annual Hanna Neumann Lecture to honour the achievements of women in mathematics.

== Personal life ==
Snaith is the daughter of mathematician Victor Snaith and sister of mathematician and musician Dan Snaith, mostly known by his artistic names Manitoba, Caribou, and Daphni.
