= Daniel Rothman =

American geophysicist

Daniel H. Rothman
- Born: Brooklyn, New York
- Citizenship: United States
- Education: Brown University (A.B., 1979); Stanford University (PhD, 1986)
- Known for: Statistical and Nonlinear Physics, Applied Mathematics
- Awards: MIT Global Habitat Longevity Award (2007); Jeanne Rosselet Fellow, Radcliffe Institute for Advanced Study (2007); Fellow, American Physical Society (2012); Fellow, American Geophysical Union (2014); Levi L. Conant Prize, American Mathematical Society (2016); Fellow (Physics), American Association for the Advancement of Science (2023)
- Scientific career
- Fields: Geophysics
- Workplaces: MIT
- Doctoral advisor: Jon Claerbout
- Notable students: Peter Dodds

Daniel H. Rothman is an American geophysicist and Professor of Geophysics in the Department of Earth, Atmospheric, and Planetary Sciences at the Massachusetts Institute of Technology.

Having made significant contributions to statistical physics, much of his work has contributed to understanding how the natural environment is organized. From such research, Rothman has made fundamental advances in topics ranging from seismology and geobiology to fluid flow and biogeochemistry.

Rothman's recent research interests lay in understanding the dynamics of the Earth's carbon cycle, with other research interests relating to: the physical foundation of natural geometric forms, thresholds of catastrophe in the climate system, and the co-evolution of life and environment.

== Biography ==
Rothman received his A.B. in applied mathematics from Brown University in 1979, before completing a PhD in geophysics at Stanford University in 1986. Rothman then joined the faculty at MIT later that year. Since 1986, he has held visiting appointments at Harvard's Radcliffe Institute for Advanced Study, The University of Chicago, and Ecole Normale Superieure.

Rothman is a Fellow of the American Physical Society and the American Geophysical Union and is the recipient of the 2016 Levi L. Conant Prize from the American Mathematical Society.

He is also co-founder and co-director of MIT's Lorenz Center with atmospheric scientist Kerry Emanuel, an interdisciplinary research center devoted to learning how climate works with a particular interest in nonlinear dynamics.

With Stiphane Zaleski, he is the co-author of Lattice-Gas Cellular Automata: Simple Models of Complex Hydrodynamics.
