= Levi L. Conant Prize =

Mathematics prize

The Levi L. Conant Prize is a mathematics prize of the American Mathematical Society, which has been awarded every year since 2001 for outstanding expository papers published in the Bulletin of the American Mathematical Society or the Notices of the American Mathematical Society in the previous five years. The award is worth $1,000.

The award is named after Levi L. Conant (1857–1916), a professor at the Worcester Polytechnic Institute, known as the author of the anthropological mathematics book The Number Concept (1896). He left the American Mathematical Society $10,000 for the foundation of the award bearing his name in 2000.

== Winners ==
Source: American Mathematical Society

- 2026: Pablo Raúl Stinga for his article "Fractional derivatives: Fourier, elephants, memory effects, viscoelastic materials, and anomalous diffusions".
- 2025: Jinyoung Park for her article "Threshold phenomena for random discrete structures".
- 2024: Jennifer Hom for her article "Getting a handle on the Conway knot".
- 2023: Joshua Greene for his article "Heegard Floer homology".
- 2022: Andrej Bauer for his article "Five stages of accepting constructive mathematics".
- 2021: Dan Margalit for his article "The mathematics of Joan Birman".
- 2020: Amie Wilkinson for her article "What are Lyapunov exponents, and why are they interesting?".
- 2019: Alex Wright for his article "From rational billiards to dynamics on moduli spaces".
- 2018: Henry Cohn for his article "A conceptual breakthrough in sphere packing".
- 2017: David H. Bailey, Jonathan Borwein, Andrew Mattingly, and Glenn Wightwick for their article "The computation of previously inaccessible digits of $\pi^2$ and Catalan's constant".
- 2016: Daniel Rothman for his article "Earth's carbon cycle: a mathematical perspective".
- 2015: Jeffrey Lagarias and Chuanming Zong for their article "Mysteries in packing regular tetrahedra".
- 2014: Alex Kontorovich for his article "From Apollonius to Zaremba: local-global phenomena in thin orbits".
- 2013: John C. Baez and John Huerta for their article "The algebra of grand unified theories".
- 2012: Persi Diaconis for his article "The Markov chain Monte Carlo revolution".
- 2011: David Vogan for his article "The character table for $E_8$".
- 2010: Bryna Kra for her article "The Green-Tao theorem on arithmetic progressions in the primes: an ergodic point of view".
- 2009: John Morgan for his article "Recent progress on the Poincaré conjecture and the classification of 3-manifolds".
- 2008: J. Brian Conrey for his article "The Riemann hypothesis"; and Shlomo Hoory, Nathan Linial, and Avi Wigderson for their article "Expander graphs and their applications".
- 2007: Jeffrey Weeks for his article "The Poincaré dodecahedral space and the mystery of the missing fluctuations".
- 2006: Ronald Solomon for his article "A brief history of the classification of the finite simple groups".
- 2005: Allen Knutson and Terence Tao for their article "Honeycombs and sums of Hermitian matrices".
- 2004: Noam Elkies for his articles "Lattices, linear codes, and invariants I, II".
- 2003: Nicholas Katz and Peter Sarnak for their article "Zeroes of zeta functions and symmetry".
- 2002: Elliott Lieb and Jakob Yngvason for their article "A guide to entropy and the second law of thermodynamics".
- 2001: Carl Pomerance for his article "A tale of two sieves".

== See also ==
- List of mathematics awards
