= Alex Kontorovich =

American mathematician

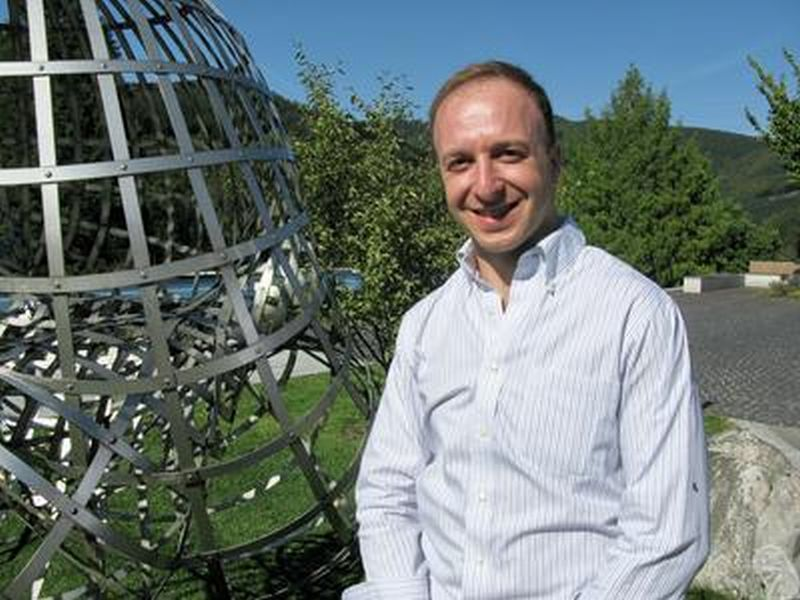
Alex Kontorovich

Alex V. Kontorovich is an American mathematician who works in the areas of analytic number theory, automorphic forms and representation theory, L-functions, harmonic analysis, and homogeneous dynamics.

== Biography ==
Kontorovich earned a bachelor's degree from Princeton University in 2002, and a PhD from Columbia University in 2007, where he studied under Dorian Goldfeld and Peter Sarnak. From 2007 to 2010 he was a Tamarkin Assistant Professor at Brown University. He was later an assistant professor at Stony Brook University and then assistant professor and associate professor at Yale University. Since 2014 he has been at Rutgers University, where he is currently a distinguished professor.

Kontorovich has held visiting positions at Harvard, ETH Zurich, and the Institute for Advanced Study. He served as the editor-in-chief for the journal Experimental Mathematics, and currently serves as managing editor for the Journal of the Association for Mathematical Research and is an editor for the Annals of Formalized Mathematics.

== Honors and awards ==
Kontorovich is a Fellow of the American Mathematical Society, elected in the 2017 class of fellows. He was a Sloan Research Fellow from 2013 to 2015.

In 2014 Kontorovich received the Levi L. Conant Prize for the paper "From Apollonius to Zaremba: Local-global phenomena in thin orbits".

== Personal life ==
Kontorovich is the son of Vladimir Kontorovich, an economics professor at Haverford College, and Alla Gil, the former managing director of the investment banking division at Goldman Sachs. He is married to Amy Rosen Kontorovich, a professor at the Icahn School of Medicine at Mount Sinai.

== Selected publications ==
- From Apollonius to Zaremba: Local-global phenomena in thin orbits. Bull. Amer. Math. Soc. 50 (2013), 187–228. Arxiv
- with Jean Bourgain: On the Local-Global Conjecture for Apollonian Gaskets. Inventiones Mathematicae 196 (2014), 589–650. Arxiv
- with Jean Bourgain: On Zaremba's Conjecture. Annals of Mathematics 180 (2014), 137–196. Arxiv
- with Hee Oh: Apollonian Packings and Horospheres on Hyperbolic 3-manifolds. J. Amer. Math. Soc. 24 (2011), 603–648. Arxiv
- with Hee Oh: Almost Prime Pythagorean Triples in Thin Orbits. J. Reine Angew. Math. 667 (2012), 89–131. Arxiv
