= Pulusuk =

- Village
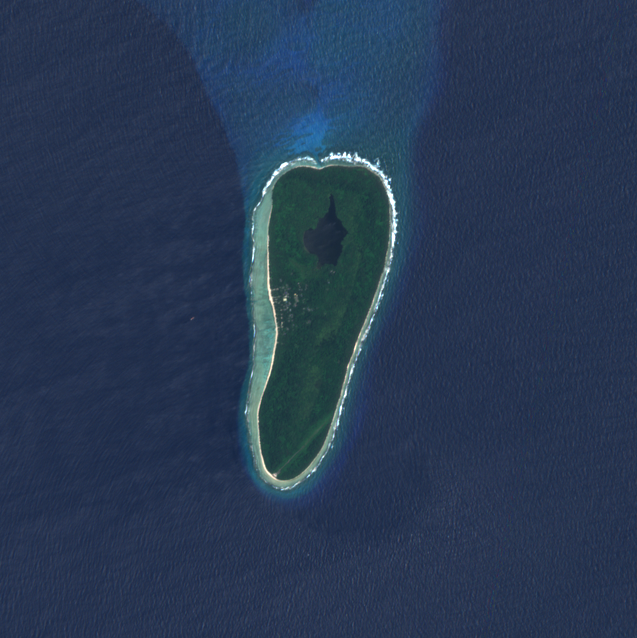
- Sentinel-2 picture of Pulusuk

- Flag

- Location of Pulusuk in the Federated States of Micronesia
- Coordinates: 6.6898°N 149.3021°E
- Country: Federated States of Micronesia
- State: Chuuk

Pulusuk or Houk Island is a village and municipality in the state of Chuuk, Federated States of Micronesia.

It is a small island that lies at the end of a 55 km (34 mi) long submerged atoll. Pulusuk is part of the Pattiw group, located 244 km (152 mi) to the west of Chuuk.

The first recorded sighting by Europeans was by Spanish naval officer Juan Antonio de Ibargoitia who was commanding the vessel Filipino in 1799. He charted it as Bartolomé.

== Name ==
The name of the island goes back to Proto-Chuukic *t'ouka or *t'ouke.

== Houk Airfield ==
Houk Airfield
- IATA: none; ICAO: none

Summary
- Airport type: Public
- Owner: Government
- Operator: Civil Government
- Serves: Pulusuk
- Coordinates: 6.6749°N 149.2988°E
- Interactive map of Houk Airfield

Runways
Direction	Length		Surface
Direction	ft	m	Surface
044	1,350	410	Concrete

Houk Airfield consists of a paved 1,350 feet (410 m) runway that cuts through the forested south end of the island. The rudimentary airport is not serviced (no passenger terminal, no hangars or no fuel). Caroline Islands Air has chartered flights to the airfield.
