= Wind-induced surface heat exchange =

Ocean to atmospheric positive feedback

The wind-induced surface heat exchange (WISHE) is a positive feedback mechanism between the ocean and atmosphere in which a stronger ocean-to-atmosphere heat flux results in a stronger atmospheric circulation, which results in a strong heat flux. It has been hypothesized that this is the mechanism by which low pressure areas in the tropics develop into tropical cyclones.

The WISHE mechanism was proposed by Kerry Emanuel in a Journal of the Atmospheric Sciences article published in 1986 – though it was first termed "air–sea interaction instability" – as an alternative to the more prevalent conditional instability of a second kind (CISK) hypothesis.
