= Morgan Prize =

North American undergraduate mathematics award

The Morgan Prize (full name Frank and Brennie Morgan Prize for Outstanding Research in Mathematics by an Undergraduate Student) is an annual award given to an undergraduate student in the US, Canada, or Mexico who demonstrates superior mathematics research. The $1,200 award, endowed by Mrs. Frank Morgan of Allentown, Pennsylvania, was founded in 1995. The award is made jointly by the American Mathematical Society, the Mathematical Association of America, and the Society for Industrial and Applied Mathematics. The Morgan Prize has been described as the highest honor given to an undergraduate in mathematics.

== Previous winners ==
1995
Winner: Kannan Soundararajan (Analytic Number Theory, University of Michigan)
Honorable mention: Kiran Kedlaya (Harvard University)
1996
Winner: Manjul Bhargava (Algebra, Harvard University)
Honorable mention: Lenhard Ng (Harvard University)
1997
Winner: Jade Vinson (Analysis and Geometry, Washington University in St. Louis)
Honorable mention: Vikaas S. Sohal (Harvard University)
1998
Winner: Daniel Biss (Combinatorial Group Theory and Topology, Harvard University)
Honorable mention: Aaron F. Archer (Harvey Mudd College)
1999
Winner: Sean McLaughlin (Proof of the Dodecahedral Conjecture, University of Michigan)
Honorable mention: Samit Dasgupta (Harvard University)
2000
Winner: Jacob Lurie (Lie Algebras, Harvard University)
Honorable mention: Wai Ling Yee (University of Waterloo)
2001
Winner: Ciprian Manolescu (Floer Homology, Harvard University)
Honorable mention: Michael Levin (Massachusetts Institute of Technology)
2002
Winner: Joshua Greene (Proof of the Kneser conjecture, Harvey Mudd College)
Honorable mention: None
2003
Winner: Melanie Wood (Belyi-extending maps and P-orderings, Duke University)
Honorable mention: Karen Yeats (University of Waterloo)
2004
Winner: Reid W. Barton (Packing Densities of Patterns, Massachusetts Institute of Technology)
Honorable mention: Po-Shen Loh (California Institute of Technology)
2005
Winner: Jacob Fox (Ramsey theory and graph theory, Massachusetts Institute of Technology)
Honorable mention: None
2007
Winner: Daniel Kane (Number Theory, Massachusetts Institute of Technology)
Honorable mention: None
2008
Winner: Nathan Kaplan (Algebraic number theory, Princeton University)
Honorable mention: None
2009
Winner: Aaron Pixton (Algebraic topology and number theory, Princeton University)
Honorable mention: Andrei Negut (Algebraic cobordism theory and dynamical systems, Princeton University)
2010
Winner: Scott Duke Kominers (Number theory, computational geometry, and mathematical economics, Harvard University)
Honorable mention: Maria Monks (Combinatorics and number theory, Massachusetts Institute of Technology)
2011
Winner: Maria Monks (Combinatorics and number theory, Massachusetts Institute of Technology)
Honorable mention: Michael Viscardi (Algebraic geometry, Harvard University), Yufei Zhao (Combinatorics and number theory, Massachusetts Institute of Technology)
2012
Winner: John Pardon (Solving Gromov's problem on distortion of knots, Princeton University)
Honorable mention: Hannah Alpert (Combinatorics, University of Chicago), Elina Robeva (Algebraic geometry, Stanford University)
2013
Winner: Fan Wei (Analysis and combinatorics, Massachusetts Institute of Technology)
Honorable mention: Dhruv Ranganathan (Toric Gromov–Witten theory, Harvey Mudd College), Jonathan Schneider (Combinatorics, Massachusetts Institute of Technology)
2014
Winner: Eric Larson (Algebraic geometry and number theory, Harvard University)
Honorable mention: None
2015
Winner: Levent Alpöge (Number theory, probability theory, and combinatorics, Harvard University)
Honorable mention: Akhil Mathew (Algebraic topology, algebraic geometry, and category theory, Harvard University)
2016
Winner: Amol Aggarwal (Combinatorics, Massachusetts Institute of Technology)
Honorable mention: Evan O'Dorney (Number Theory, algebra, and combinatorics, Harvard University)
2017
Winner: David H. Yang (Algebraic geometry and geometric representation theory, Massachusetts Institute of Technology)
Honorable mention: Aaron Landesman (Algebraic geometry, number theory, combinatorics, Harvard University)
2018
Winner: Ashvin Swaminathan (Algebraic geometry, number theory, and combinatorics, Harvard University)
Honorable mention: Greg Yang (Homological theory of functions, Harvard University)
2019
Winner: Ravi Jagadeesan (Algebraic geometry, mathematical economics, statistical theory, number theory, and combinatorics, Harvard University)
Honorable mention: Evan Chen (Number theory, Combinatorics, Massachusetts Institute of Technology), Huy Tuan Pham (Additive Combinatorics, Stanford University)
2020
Winner: Nina Zubrilina (Mathematical analysis and analytic number theory, Stanford University)
Honorable mention: Mehtaab Sawhney (Combinatorics, Massachusetts Institute of Technology), Cynthia Stoner (Combinatorics, Harvard University), Ashwin Sah (Combinatorics, Massachusetts Institute of Technology), Murilo Corato Zanarella (Princeton University)
2021
Winner: Ashwin Sah (Combinatorics, discrete geometry, and probability, Massachusetts Institute of Technology), Mehtaab Sawhney (Combinatorics, discrete geometry, and probability, Massachusetts Institute of Technology)
Honorable mention: Noah Kravitz (Yale University)
2022
Winner: Travis Dillon (Number theory, combinatorics, discrete geometry, and symbolic dynamics, Lawrence University)
Honorable mention: Sophie Kriz (University of Michigan), Alex Cohen (Yale University)
2023
Winner: Letong (Carina) Hong (Number theory, combinatorics, and probability, Massachusetts Institute of Technology)
Honorable mention: Sophie Kriz (University of Michigan), Egor Lappo (Stanford University)
2024
Winner: Faye Jackson (analytic number theory, University of Michigan)
Honorable mention: Rupert Li (Massachusetts Institute of Technology), Daniel Zhu (Massachusetts Institute of Technology)
2025
Winner: Kenta Suzuki (Representation theory, Massachusetts Institute of Technology)
Honorable mention: None
2026
Winner: Yunseo Choi (Number Theory and combinatorics, Harvard University)
Honorable mention: Eliot Hodges (Harvard University), Daniel Larsen (Massachusetts Institute of Technology)

== See also ==
- List of mathematics awards
- LeRoy Apker Award, an award for outstanding undergraduate (experimental) physics
