= Dirk Kreimer =

German physicist

Dirk Kreimer (born 12 July 1960) is a German physicist who pioneered the Hopf-algebraic approach to perturbative quantum field theory with Alain Connes and other co-authors. He is currently Humboldt professor at the department of mathematics of Humboldt University in Berlin, where he teaches the courses of Quantum Field Theory (I and II) and Hopf Algebras and the Renormalization Group.
