= Quantum graph =

Type of graph in mathematics and physics

In mathematics and physics, a quantum graph is a linear, network-shaped structure of vertices connected on edges (i.e., a graph) in which each edge is given a length and where a differential (or pseudo-differential) equation is posed on each edge. An example would be a power network consisting of power lines (edges) connected at transformer stations (vertices); the differential equations would then describe the voltage along each of the lines, with boundary conditions for each edge provided at the adjacent vertices ensuring that the current added over all edges adds to zero at each vertex.

Quantum graphs were first studied by Linus Pauling as models of free electrons in organic molecules in the 1930s. They also arise in a variety of mathematical contexts, e.g. as model systems in quantum chaos, in the study of waveguides, in photonic crystals and in Anderson localization, or as a limit on shrinking thin wires. Quantum graphs have become prominent models in mesoscopic physics used to obtain a theoretical understanding of nanotechnology. Another, more simple notion of quantum graphs was introduced by Freedman et al.

Aside from actually solving the differential equations posed on a quantum graph for purposes of concrete applications, typical questions that arise are those of controllability (what inputs have to be provided to bring the system into a desired state, for example providing sufficient power to all houses on a power network) and identifiability (how and where one has to measure something to obtain a complete picture of the state of the system, for example measuring the pressure of a water pipe network to determine whether or not there is a leaking pipe).

== Metric graphs ==
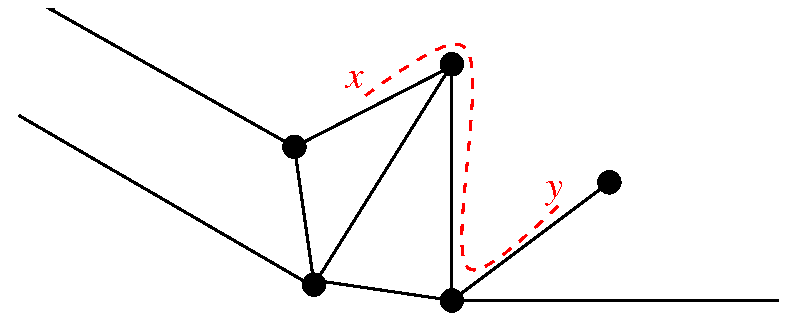
A metric graph embedded in the plane with three open edges. The dashed line denotes the metric distance between two points $x$ and $y$.

A metric graph is a graph consisting of a set $V$ of vertices and a set $E$ of edges where each edge $e=(v_1,v_2)\in E$ has been associated with an interval $[0,L_e]$ so that $x_e$ is the coordinate on the interval, the vertex $v_1$ corresponds to $x_e=0$ and $v_2$ to $x_e=L_e$ or vice versa. The choice of which vertex lies at zero is arbitrary with the alternative corresponding to a change of coordinate on the edge. The graph has a natural metric: for two points $x,y$ on the graph, $\rho(x,y)$ is the shortest distance between them where distance is measured along the edges of the graph.

Open graphs: in the combinatorial graph model edges always join pairs of vertices however in a quantum graph one may also consider semi-infinite edges. These are edges associated with the interval $[0,\infty)$ attached to a single vertex at $x_e=0$. A graph with one or more such open edges is referred to as an open graph.

== Quantum graphs ==
Quantum graphs are metric graphs equipped with a differential (or pseudo-differential) operator acting on functions on the graph. A function $f$ on a metric graph is defined as the $|E|$-tuple of functions $f_e(x_e)$ on the intervals. The Hilbert space of the graph is $\bigoplus_{e\in E} L^2([0,L_e])$ where the inner product of two functions is

$$\langle f,g \rangle = \sum_{e\in E} \int_{0}^{L_e} f_e^{*}(x_e)g_e(x_e) \, dx_e,$$

$L_e$ may be infinite in the case of an open edge. The simplest example of an operator on a metric graph is the Laplace operator. The operator on an edge is $-\frac{\textrm{d}^2}{\textrm{d} x_e^2}$ where $x_e$ is the coordinate on the edge. To make the operator self-adjoint a suitable domain must be specified. This is typically achieved by taking the Sobolev space $H^2$ of functions on the edges of the graph and specifying matching conditions at the vertices.

The trivial example of matching conditions that make the operator self-adjoint are the Dirichlet boundary conditions, $f_e(0)=f_e(L_e)=0$ for every edge. An eigenfunction on a finite edge may be written as

$$f_e(x_e) = \sin \left( \frac{n \pi x_e}{L_e} \right)$$

for integer $n$. If the graph is closed with no infinite edges and the lengths of the edges of the graph are rationally independent then an eigenfunction is supported on a single graph edge and the eigenvalues are $\frac{n^2\pi^2}{L_e^2}$. The Dirichlet conditions don't allow interaction between the intervals so the spectrum is the same as that of the set of disconnected edges.

More interesting self-adjoint matching conditions that allow interaction between edges are the Neumann or natural matching conditions. A function $f$ in the domain of the operator is continuous everywhere on the graph and the sum of the outgoing derivatives at a vertex is zero,

$$\sum_{e\sim v} f'(v) = 0 \ ,$$

where $f'(v)=f'(0)$ if the vertex $v$ is at $x=0$ and $f'(v)=-f'(L_e)$ if $v$ is at $x=L_e$.

The properties of other operators on metric graphs have also been studied.

- These include the more general class of Schrödinger operators,
  $$\left( i \frac{\textrm{d}}{\textrm{d} x_e} + A_e(x_e) \right)^2 + V_e(x_e) \ ,$$
  where $A_e$ is a "magnetic vector potential" on the edge and $V_e$ is a scalar potential.
- Another example is the Dirac operator on a graph which is a matrix valued operator acting on vector valued functions that describe the quantum mechanics of particles with an intrinsic angular momentum of one half such as the electron.
- The Dirichlet-to-Neumann operator on a graph is a pseudo-differential operator that arises in the study of photonic crystals.

== Theorems ==
All self-adjoint matching conditions of the Laplace operator on a graph can be classified according to a scheme of Kostrykin and Schrader. In practice, it is often more convenient to adopt a formalism introduced by Kuchment, which automatically yields an operator in variational form.

Let $v$ be a vertex with $d$ edges emanating from it. For simplicity we choose the coordinates on the edges so that $v$ lies at $x_e=0$ for each edge meeting at $v$. For a function $f$ on the graph let

$$\mathbf{f}=(f_{e_1}(0),f_{e_2}(0),\dots,f_{e_{d}}(0))^T , \qquad \mathbf{f}'=(f'_{e_1}(0),f'_{e_2}(0),\dots,f'_{e_{d}}(0))^T.$$

Matching conditions at $v$ can be specified by a pair of matrices $A$ and $B$ through the linear equation,

$$A \mathbf{f} +B \mathbf{f}'=\mathbf{0}.$$

The matching conditions define a self-adjoint operator if $(A, B)$ has the maximal rank $d$ and $AB^{*}=BA^{*}.$

The spectrum of the Laplace operator on a finite graph can be conveniently described using a scattering matrix approach introduced by Kottos and Smilansky. The eigenvalue problem on an edge is,

$$-\frac{d^2}{dx_e^2} f_e(x_e)=k^2 f_e(x_e).\,$$

So a solution on the edge can be written as a linear combination of plane waves.

$$f_e(x_e) = c_e \textrm{e}^{i k x_e} + \hat{c}_e \textrm{e}^{-i k x_e}.\,$$

where in a time-dependent Schrödinger equation $c$ is the coefficient of the outgoing plane wave at $0$ and $\hat{c}$ coefficient of the incoming plane wave at $0$. The matching conditions at $v$ define a scattering matrix

$$S(k)=-(A+i kB)^{-1}(A-ikB).\,$$

The scattering matrix relates the vectors of incoming and outgoing plane-wave coefficients at $v$, $\mathbf{c}=S(k)\hat{\mathbf{c}}$. For self-adjoint matching conditions $S$ is unitary. An element of $\sigma_{(uv)(vw)}$ of $S$ is a complex transition amplitude from a directed edge $(uv)$ to the edge $(vw)$ which in general depends on $k$. However, for a large class of matching conditions the S-matrix is independent of $k$. With Neumann matching conditions for example

$$A=\left( \begin{array}{ccccc}
1& -1 & 0 & 0 & \dots \\
0 & 1 & -1 & 0 & \dots \\
& & \ddots & \ddots &  \\
0& \dots & 0 &  1 & -1 \\
0 &\dots & 0 & 0& 0 \\
\end{array} \right) , \quad B=\left( \begin{array}{cccc}
0& 0 & \dots & 0 \\
\vdots & \vdots &  & \vdots \\
0& 0 & \dots & 0 \\
1 &1 & \dots & 1 \\
\end{array} \right).$$

Substituting in the equation for $S$ produces $k$-independent transition amplitudes

$$\sigma_{(uv)(vw)}=\frac{2}{d}-\delta_{uw}.\,$$

where $\delta_{uw}$ is the Kronecker delta function that is one if $u=w$ and zero otherwise. From the transition amplitudes we may define a $2|E|\times 2|E|$ matrix

$$U_{(uv)(lm)}(k)= \delta_{vl} \sigma_{(uv)(vm)}(k) \textrm{e}^{i kL_{(uv)}}.\,$$

$U$ is called the bond scattering matrix and can be thought of as a quantum evolution operator on the graph. It is unitary and acts on the vector of $2|E|$ plane-wave coefficients for the graph where $c_{(uv)}$ is the coefficient of the plane wave traveling from $u$ to $v$. The phase $\textrm{e}^{i kL_{(uv)}}$ is the phase acquired by the plane wave when propagating from vertex $u$ to vertex $v$.

Quantization condition: An eigenfunction on the graph can be defined through its associated $2|E|$ plane-wave coefficients. As the eigenfunction is stationary under the quantum evolution a quantization condition for the graph can be written using the evolution operator.

$$|U(k)-I|=0.\,$$

Eigenvalues $k_j$ occur at values of $k$ where the matrix $U(k)$ has an eigenvalue one. We will order the spectrum with $0\leqslant k_0 \leqslant k_1 \leqslant \dots$.

The first trace formula for a graph was derived by Roth (1983). In 1997 Kottos and Smilansky used the quantization condition above to obtain the following trace formula for the Laplace operator on a graph when the transition amplitudes are independent of $k$. The trace formula links the spectrum with periodic orbits on the graph.

$$d(k):=\sum_{j=0}^{\infty} \delta(k-k_j)=\frac{L}{\pi}+\frac{1}{\pi}
\sum_p \frac{L_p}{r_p} A_p \cos(kL_p).$$

$d(k)$ is called the density of states. The right hand side of the trace formula is made up of two terms, the Weyl term $\frac{L}{\pi}$ is the mean separation of eigenvalues and the oscillating part is a sum over all periodic orbits $p=(e_1,e_2,\dots,e_n)$ on the graph. $L_p=\sum_{e\in p} L_e$ is the length of the orbit and $L=\sum_{e\in E}L_e$ is the total length of the graph. For an orbit generated by repeating a shorter primitive orbit, $r_p$ counts the number of repartitions. $A_p=\sigma_{e_1 e_2} \sigma_{e_2 e_3} \dots \sigma_{e_n e_1}$ is the product of the transition amplitudes at the vertices of the graph around the orbit.

== Applications ==
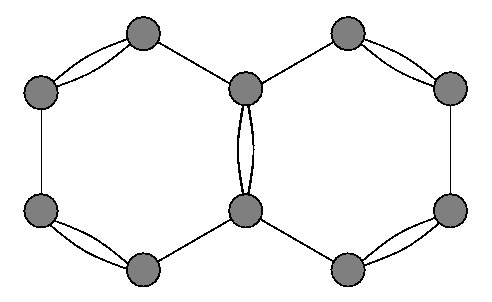
Naphthalene molecule

Quantum graphs were first employed in the 1930s to model the spectrum of free electrons in organic molecules like Naphthalene. As a first approximation the atoms are taken to be vertices while the σ-electrons form bonds that fix a frame in the shape of the molecule on which the free electrons are confined.

A similar problem appears when considering quantum waveguides. These are mesoscopic systems - systems built with a width on the scale of nanometers. A quantum waveguide can be thought of as a fattened graph where the edges are thin tubes. The spectrum of the Laplace operator on this domain converges to the spectrum of the Laplace operator on the graph under certain conditions. Understanding mesoscopic systems plays an important role in the field of nanotechnology.

In 1997 Kottos and Smilansky proposed quantum graphs as a model to study quantum chaos, the quantum mechanics of systems that are classically chaotic. Classical motion on the graph can be defined as a probabilistic Markov chain where the probability of scattering from edge $e$ to edge $f$ is given by the absolute value of the quantum transition amplitude squared, $|\sigma_{ef}|^2$. For almost all finite connected quantum graphs the probabilistic dynamics is ergodic and mixing, in other words chaotic.

Quantum graphs embedded in two or three dimensions appear in the study of photonic crystals. In two dimensions a simple model of a photonic crystal consists of polygonal cells of a dense dielectric with narrow interfaces between the cells filled with air. Studying dielectric modes that stay mostly in the dielectric gives rise to a pseudo-differential operator on the graph that follows the narrow interfaces.

Periodic quantum graphs like the lattice in ${\mathbb R}^2$ are common models of periodic systems and quantum graphs have been applied to the study the phenomena of Anderson localization where localized states occur at the edge of spectral bands in the presence of disorder.

== See also ==
- Schild's Ladder, a novel dealing with a fictional quantum graph theory
- Feynman diagram
