= Pattiw =

Island group in the Federated States of Micronesia

Coordinates: 7.1649°N 149.3633°E

Location of the Pattiw Group in Chuuk State, Federated States of Micronesia

Pattiw or Western Islands is the name of the westernmost area of the State of Chuuk in the Federated States of Micronesia, consisting of the three islands or atolls of Houk, Poluwat and Pollap, with a total land area of 7.17 square kilometres (2.77 square miles) and a population of 2,736 (as of the census of 2000). Pattiw is one of three areas of Chuuk's Northwestern Region, Oksoritod. Poluwat is attached to the large Uranie Bank (322 km^{2} or 124 sq mi ) and lies in the northwest corner of the bank, while Houk (Pulusuk) marks the southeastern point of Manila Reef (also 332 square kilometres or 128 square miles in area).

== Banks ==
There are more separate submerged banks in the area and further west up to 148°E, which is considered the dividing line to the State of Yap:

- Hitchfield Bank 7°44'N 149°40'E (19 kilometres (12 miles) east-northeast of Pollap)
- Lady Elgin Bank 6°18'N 149°28'E
- Helene Shoal 5°32'N 149°08'E
- Enderby Reef 7°23'N 149°07'E (5 kilometres (3.1 miles) west-northwest of Poluwat)
- Gray Feather Bank 8°00'N 148°46'E (the largest bank in the area, a completely submerged atoll)
- Mogami Bank 8°23'N 148°45'E
- Koyo Bank 8°26'N 148°24'E, north of Gray Feather Bank
- Shin-matsuye Bank 7°56'N 148°21'E
- McLaughlin Bank 9°07'N 148°06'E, with small part west of 148°E (border to the State of Yap)
- Condor Bank 7°30'N 148°04'E (not to be confused with condor reef in the State of Yap)

There are four of Chuuk's 40 municipalities in the Pattiw area. Houk and Poluwat are municipalities, while Pollap atoll is divided into the municipalities of Pollap (north) and Tamatam (south). The largest municipality of Pattiw is Poluwat, with a population of 1,015 (as of 2000).
