= Percy Deift =

South African mathematician

Percy Alec Deift
- Born: September 10, 1945 (age 80); Durban, South Africa
- Education: Princeton University (Ph.D.)
- Awards: George Pólya Prize (1998); Guggenheim Fellowship (1999); Henri Poincaré Prize (2018)
- Scientific career
- Fields: Mathematics
- Workplaces: Courant Institute of Mathematical Sciences, NYU
- Thesis: Classical Scattering Theory with a Trace Condition (1977)
- Doctoral advisor: Barry Simon

Percy Alec Deift (born September 10, 1945) is a mathematician known for his work on spectral theory, integrable systems, random matrix theory and Riemann–Hilbert problems.

== Life ==
Deift was born in Durban, South Africa, where he obtained degrees in chemical engineering, physics, and mathematics, and received a Ph.D. in mathematical physics from Princeton University in 1977. He is a Silver Professor at the Courant Institute of Mathematical Sciences, New York University.

== Honors and awards ==
Deift is a fellow of the American Mathematical Society (elected 2012), a member of the American Academy of Arts and Sciences (elected 2003), and of the U.S. National Academy of Sciences (elected 2009).

He is a co-winner of the 1998 Pólya Prize, and was named a Guggenheim Fellow in 1999. He gave an invited address at the International Congress of Mathematicians in Berlin in 1998 and plenary addresses in 2006 at the International Congress of Mathematicians in Madrid and at the International Congress on Mathematical Physics in Rio de Janeiro. Deift gave the Gibbs Lecture at the Joint Meeting of the American Mathematical Society in 2009. Along with Michael Aizenman and Giovanni Gallavotti, he won the Henri Poincaré Prize in 2018.

== Selected works ==
- with Eugene Trubowitz: Inverse scattering on the line, Communications on pure and applied Mathematics, vol. 32, 1979, pp. 121–251 doi:10.1002/cpa.3160320202
- with Fernando Lund, E. Trubowitz: Deift, P; Lund, F; Trubowitz, E (February 1980). "Nonlinear wave equations and constrained harmonic motion" (PDF). Proc Natl Acad Sci U S A. 77 (2): 716–719. Bibcode:1980PNAS...77..716D. doi:10.1073/pnas.77.2.716. PMC 348351. PMID 16592777.
- with Richard Beals, Carlos Tomei: Direct and inverse scattering on the line, AMS, 1988
- with Luen-Chau Li, C. Tomei: Loop groups, discrete versions of some classical integrable systems, and rank 2 extensions, AMS, 1992
- with K. T-R McLaughlin: A continuum limit of the Toda lattice, AMS, 1998
- Orthogonal polynomials and random matrices: a Riemann-Hilbert approach, AMS (American Mathematical Society), 2000 (and Courant Institute, 1999)
- with Dmitri Gioev: Random matrix theory: invariant embeddings and universality, AMS, 2009
- with Jinho Baik and Toufic Suidan Combinatorics and Random Matrix Theory. American Mathematical Society. 22 June 2016. ISBN 978-0-8218-4841-8.

== See also ==
- Riemann–Hilbert problems
- random matrix theory
- integrable systems
