= International Association of Mathematical Physics =

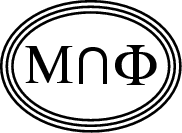
- IAMP Logo
- Formation: 1976
- Type: Scientific organization
- President: Kasia Rejzner
- Key people: Jan Philip Solovej (vice-president), Chiara Saffirio (secretary), Sven Bachmann (treasurer)
- Website: iamp.org

The International Association of Mathematical Physics (IAMP) was founded in 1976 to promote research in mathematical physics. It brings together research mathematicians and theoretical physicists, including students. The association's ordinary members are individual researchers, although associate membership is available to organizations and companies. The IAMP is governed by an executive committee elected by the ordinary members.

The association sponsors the International Congress on Mathematical Physics (ICMP), which takes place every three years, and it also supports smaller conferences and workshops. There is a quarterly news bulletin.

IAMP currently awards two kinds of research prizes in mathematical physics at its triannual meetings, the Henri Poincaré Prize (created in 1997) and the Early Career Award (created in 2009).

== List of presidents ==
The presidents of the IAMP since its foundation were:

- 2024–: Kasia Rejzner
- 2021–23: Bruno Nachtergaele
- 2015–20: Robert Seiringer
- 2012–14: Antti Kupiainen
- 2009–11: Pavel Exner
- 2006–08: Giovanni Gallavotti
- 2003–05: David Brydges
- 2000–02: Herbert Spohn
- 1997–99: Elliott Lieb
- 1991–96: Arthur Jaffe
- 1988–90: John R. Klauder
- 1985–87: Konrad Osterwalder
- 1982–84: Elliott Lieb
- 1979–81: Huzihiro Araki
- 1976–78: Walter Thirring

== Prizes awarded by IAMP ==
=== Henri Poincaré Prize ===
The Henri Poincaré Prize is sponsored by the Daniel Iagolnitzer Foundation to recognize outstanding contributions in mathematical physics, and contributions which lay the groundwork for novel developments in this broad field. The Prize was also created to recognize and support young people of exceptional promise who have already made outstanding contributions to the field of mathematical physics.

The prize is usually awarded to three individuals every three years at the International Congress on Mathematical Physics (ICMP). The prize committee is appointed by the IAMP.

=== IAMP Early Career Award ===
The prize is awarded at the International Congress on Mathematical Physics (ICMP) in recognition of a single achievement in Mathematical Physics, for scientists whose age is less than 35.

Year	ICMP Location	Prize winner
2009	Prague	Mihalis Dafermos
2012	Aalborg	Artur Avila
2015	Santiago de Chile	Hugo Duminil-Copin
2018	Montréal	Semyon Dyatlov
2021	Geneva	Amol Aggarwal
2024	Strasbourg	Peter Hintz

== List of Past IAMP Congresses (ICMP) ==
A list of past congresses may be found here.

== See also ==
- Mathematical physics
- International Congress on Mathematical Physics
- Henri Poincaré Prize
