= Jeffrey Schenker =

Jeffrey Hudson Schenker
- Born: December 22, 1972 (age 53)
- Education: University of Wyoming (B.A., B.S., M.S.); Princeton University (Ph.D.)
- Known for: Mathematical physics Anderson localization Disordered quantum systems
- Awards: Fellow of the American Mathematical Society (2020); J. Sutherland Frame Excellence in Teaching Award (2009)
- Scientific career
- Fields: Mathematics; Mathematical physics
- Workplaces: Michigan State University (Professor and Chair)
- Doctoral advisor: Michael Aizenman

Jeffrey Hudson Schenker (born December 22, 1972) is an American professor of mathematics and current chair of the mathematics department at Michigan State University. His research focuses on mathematical physics, with particular emphasis on Anderson localization, disordered quantum systems, and statistical physics.

== Early life and education ==
Schenker grew up in Laramie, Wyoming, and completed all of his undergraduate and master's education at the University of Wyoming. He was named a National Merit Scholar (1991–1995) and elected to Phi Beta Kappa in 1995. He earned a B.A. with honors in chemistry in 1995, a B.S. with honors in mathematics and a B.S. in physics in 1996, and an M.S. in applied mathematics in 1997.

He received his Ph.D. in mathematics in 2002 from Princeton University, with the thesis Schrödinger Evolution: Localization Bounds and Adiabatic Theorems in the Absence of a Gap Condition, written under the supervision of Michael Aizenman. He held an NSF Graduate Fellowship from 1997 to 2000 during his doctoral studies.

== Career ==
Schenker was an NSF Postdoctoral Fellow at the University of California, Irvine from 2002 to 2003, a postdoctoral fellow at ETH Zürich from 2003 to 2005, and an NSF Postdoctoral Fellow and member at the Institute for Advanced Study from 2005 to 2007. He joined Michigan State University as an assistant professor in 2007, was promoted to associate professor in 2010, and has been a full professor since 2016. He served as Director of Graduate Studies from 2017 to 2020 and has been Chair of Mathematics since 2022.

He has held visiting positions at the Isaac Newton Institute, the Bernoulli Center, the Institute for Advanced Study, the Mittag-Leffler Institute, and Sorbonne Paris North University.

Schenker's research centers on the rigorous mathematical analysis of physical systems subject to disorder or randomness. His work spans Anderson localization for random Schrödinger operators, quantum diffusion in fluctuating media, ergodic quantum processes, and mathematical models of statistical physics. He has published more than 70 research papers and received sustained external funding from the National Science Foundation, including a CAREER award.

== Awards and honors ==
In 2019, Schenker was elected as a Fellow of the American Mathematical Society in the 2020 class of fellows.

== Selected publications ==
- M. Aizenman; J. H. Schenker; R. H. Friedrich; D. Hundertmark (2001), "Finite-volume criteria for Anderson localization", Comm. Math. Phys., 224: 219–253
- F. Germinet; A. Klein; J. H. Schenker (2007), "Dynamical delocalization in random Landau Hamiltonians", Annals of Mathematics, 166: 215–244
- A. Figotin; J. H. Schenker (2007), "Hamiltonian structure for dissipative and dispersive dynamical systems", Journal of Statistical Physics, 128: 969–1056
- J. H. Schenker (2009), "Eigenvector Localization for Random Band Matrices with Power Law Band Width", Comm. Math. Phys., 290: 1065–1097
- R. Movassagh; J. Schenker (2021), "Theory of Ergodic Quantum Processes", Physical Review X, 11: 041001
