= Chiara Saffirio =

Prof. Dr. Chiara Saffirio
- Saffirio at Oberwolfach in 2026
- Born: September 9, 1985 (age 41); Rome, Italy
- Education: University of Rome La Sapienza
- Known for: Kinetic theory, classical and quantum systems
- Awards: IUPAP Young Scientist Prize (2021), ERC Grant
- Scientific career
- Fields: Kinetic Theory, Statistical Mechanics, Many-body systems
- Workplaces: University of Freiburg, University of Basel
- Website: uni-freiburg.de/reinemathematik/prof-dr-chiara-saffirio/

Chiara Saffirio (born 9 September 1985 in Rome, Italy) is an Italian mathematician working in kinetic theory and classical and quantum systems. She has been Full Professor of Mathematics at the University of Freiburg since 2025.

== Biography ==
Chiara Saffirio studied at University of Rome La Sapienza, where she received her PhD degree in Mathematics in 2012.

Later, Saffirio worked as postdoctoral researcher in the Hausdorff Center for Mathematics at the University of Bonn, Germany, under the supervision of Benjamin Schlein, and as an SNF Ambizione fellow at the University of Zurich, Switzerland. In 2019 she was appointed SNF Eccellenza Assistant Professor at the University of Basel, Switzerland. At the University of Basel Saffirio was appointed as head of the mathematical physics research group.

In 2025 Saffirio became Associate Professor and Canada Research Chair of Complex Quantum Systems at the Mathematics Department of the University of British Columbia, Vancouver, Canada. In October 2025 Saffirio became full professor of Pure Mathematics at University of Freiburg, Germany.

== Research ==
Chiara Saffirio conducts research which lies at the interplay of analysis and mathematical physics. It focuses on kinetic theory, scaling limits in interacting particle systems (classical and quantum), semiclassical analysis and theoretical aspects of partial differential equations.

== Awards and Honours ==
- In 2021 Saffirio received the IUPAP Young Scientist Prize "for her important contributions towards the mathematical understanding of the dynamics of classical and quantum many-body systems, leading to rigorous derivations of effective evolution equations".
- In 2022 Saffirio received an ERC Starting Grant as Principal Investigator (PI) of the "Advances in Effective Evolution Equations for Classical and Quantum Systems" project.
- Saffirio has spoken at many prestigious events and institutions including the Simons Laufer Mathematical Sciences Institute at the University of California, Berkeley, (2024), the Erwin Schrödinger International Institute for Mathematics and Physics (ESI) in Vienna (2025), the Isaac Newton Institute (INI) in Cambridge, the Imperial College of London (2026) and the Kinetic Theory, Fluid Mechanics and Microscopic Systems conference in Rome (2026). In 2026 Saffirio was invited as plenary speaker in May conference, an event featured by the European Women in Mathematics (EWM).

== Affiliations ==
- 2019: Group Leader in the NCCR SwissMAP.
- 2021: Associate Editor of KRM (Kinetic and Related Models)
- 2024: executive committee (secretary) of the International Association of Mathematical Physics (IAMP)
- 2024: editor of Journal de l'École Polytechnique.
- 2026: delegate of the Swiss Physical Society for Annales Henri Poincaré.
- 2026: executive committee of the Association Publication de l’Institut Henri Poincaré, France.
