= Barry Simon =

American mathematician

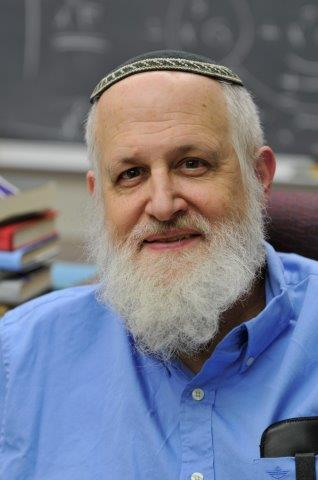
- Simon in 2015
- Born: 16 April 1946 (age 80); New York City
- Education: AB, Harvard University; PhD, Princeton University
- Title: Professor
- Spouse: Martha Simon
- Awards: Henri Poincaré Prize (2012); Bolyai Prize (2015); Leroy P. Steele Prize (2016); Dannie Heineman Prize (2018)
- Scientific career
- Workplaces: Princeton University; Caltech
- Doctoral advisor: Arthur Wightman
- Doctoral students: Percy Deift; Alexander Kiselev; Antti Kupiainen

Barry Martin Simon (born 16 April 1946) is an American mathematical physicist and was the IBM professor of mathematics and theoretical physics at Caltech, known for his prolific contributions in spectral theory, functional analysis, and nonrelativistic quantum mechanics (particularly Schrödinger operators), including the connections to atomic and molecular physics. He has authored more than 400 publications on mathematics and physics.

His work has focused on broad areas of mathematical physics and analysis covering: quantum field theory, statistical mechanics, Brownian motion, random matrix theory, general nonrelativistic quantum mechanics (including N-body systems and resonances), nonrelativistic quantum mechanics in electric and magnetic fields, the semi-classical limit, the singular continuous spectrum, random and ergodic Schrödinger operators, orthogonal polynomials, and non-selfadjoint spectral theory.

== Early life ==
Barry Simon's mother was a school teacher, his father was an accountant. His ancestors were from Odesa and Grodno. His grandfather, whose original surname was Slopak, adopted the surname Simon after immigrating to the United States. Simon attended James Madison High School in Brooklyn. Simon is an observant Jew.

== Career ==
During his high school years, Simon started attending college courses for highly gifted pupils at Columbia University. In 1962, Simon won a MAA mathematics competition. The New York Times reported that in order to receive full credits for a faultless test result he had to make a submission with MAA. In this submission he proved that one of the problems posed in the test was ambiguous.

In 1962, Simon entered Harvard with a stipend. He became a Putnam Fellow in 1965 at 19 years old. He received his AB in 1966 from Harvard College and his PhD in Physics at Princeton University in 1970, supervised by Arthur Strong Wightman. His dissertation dealt with Quantum mechanics for Hamiltonians defined as quadratic forms.

Following his doctoral studies, Simon took a professorship at Princeton for several years, often working with colleague Elliott H. Lieb on the Thomas–Fermi model and Hartree–Fock method of atoms in addition to phase transitions and mentoring many of the same students as Lieb. He eventually was persuaded to take a post at Caltech, from which he retired in the summer of 2016.

== Honors and awards ==
- 1974: Invited Speaker at the International Congress of Mathematicians in Vancouver
- 1981: Elected fellow of the American Physical Society
- 1990: Elected correspondent member of the Austrian Academy of Sciences
- 2005: Elected fellow of the American Academy of Arts and Sciences
- 2012: Elected fellow of the American Mathematical Society
- 2012: Awarded the Henri Poincaré Prize
- 2015: Awarded the Bolyai Prize of the Hungarian Academy of Sciences
- 2016: Awarded the Steele Prize for Lifetime achievements
- 2018: Dannie Heineman Prize for Mathematical Physics from the American Physical Society
- 2019: Elected to the National Academy of Sciences

== Selected publications ==
=== Articles ===
- Simon, Barry (1973). "Resonances in n-Body Quantum Systems With Dilatation Analytic Potentials and the Foundations of Time-Dependent Perturbation Theory". The Annals of Mathematics. 97 (2): 247–274. doi:10.2307/1970847. JSTOR 1970847. (over 700 citations)
- Guerra, F.; Rosen, L.; Simon, B. (1975). "The P(φ)_{2} Euclidean Quantum Field Theory as Classical Statistical Mechanics". The Annals of Mathematics. 101 (1): 111-259. doi:10.2307/1970988. JSTOR 1970988.
- Lieb, Elliott H; Simon, Barry (1977). "The Thomas-Fermi theory of atoms, molecules and solids". Advances in Mathematics. 23 (1): 22–116. doi:10.1016/0001-8708(77)90108-6. (over 700 citations)
- Fröhlich, J.; Simon, B.; Spencer, T. (1976). "Infrared bounds, phase transitions and continuous symmetry breaking". Communications in Mathematical Physics. 50 (1): 79–95. Bibcode:1976CMaPh..50...79F. doi:10.1007/BF01608557. ISSN 0010-3616.
- Perry, P.; Sigal, I. M.; Simon, B. (1981). "Spectral Analysis of N-Body Schrodinger Operators". The Annals of Mathematics. 114 (3): 519-567. doi:10.2307/1971301. JSTOR 1971301.
- Simon, Barry (1982). "Schrödinger semigroups". Bulletin of the American Mathematical Society. 7 (3): 447–526. doi:10.1090/S0273-0979-1982-15041-8. ISSN 0273-0979. (over 1500 citations)
- (with M. Aizenman) Brownian motion and Harnack's inequality for Schrödinger operators, Commun. Pure Appl. Math. 35 (1982), 209–273 (over 600 citations)
- Simon, Barry (1983-12-12). "Holonomy, the Quantum Adiabatic Theorem, and Berry's Phase". Physical Review Letters. 51 (24): 2167–2170. Bibcode:1983PhRvL..51.2167S. doi:10.1103/PhysRevLett.51.2167. ISSN 0031-9007. (over 2050 citations)
- Avron, J. E.; Seiler, R.; Simon, B. (1983-07-04). "Homotopy and Quantization in Condensed Matter Physics". Physical Review Letters. 51 (1): 51–53. Bibcode:1983PhRvL..51...51A. doi:10.1103/PhysRevLett.51.51. ISSN 0031-9007. (over 600 citations)
- Simon, Barry (1984). "Semiclassical Analysis of Low Lying Eigenvalues, II. Tunneling". The Annals of Mathematics. 120 (1): 89–118. doi:10.2307/2007072. JSTOR 2007072.
- Simon, Barry; Wolff, Tom (1986). "Singular continuous spectrum under rank one perturbations and localization for random hamiltonians". Communications on Pure and Applied Mathematics. 39 (1): 75–90. doi:10.1002/cpa.3160390105. ISSN 0010-3640.
- Simon, Barry (1995). "Operators with Singular Continuous Spectrum: I. General Operators". The Annals of Mathematics. 141 (1): 131–145. doi:10.2307/2118629. JSTOR 2118629.

=== Books ===
- Quantum mechanics for hamiltonians defined as quadratic forms. Princeton University Press, Princeton NJ 1971, ISBN 0-691-08090-9.
- with Michael C. Reed: Methods of Modern Mathematical Physics. 4 vols. Academic Press, New York, NY etc. 1972–1978;
  - vol. 1: Functional Analysis. 1972, ISBN 0-12-585001-8;
  - vol. 2: Fourier Analysis, Self-Adjointness. 1975, ISBN 0-12-585002-6;
  - vol. 3: Scattering Theory. Academic Press, 1979, ISBN 0-12-585003-4;
  - vol. 4: Analysis of Operators. Academic Press, 1978, ISBN 0-12-585004-2.
- The $P(\Phi)_2$ Euclidean (Quantum) Field Theory. Princeton University Press, Princeton NJ 1974, ISBN 0-691-08144-1.
- as editor with Elliott H. Lieb and Arthur S. Wightman: Studies in mathematical physics. Essays in Honor of Valentine Bargmann. Princeton University Press, Princeton NJ 1976, ISBN 0-691-08180-8, contributions by Barry Simon:
  - pp. 305–326: On the number of bound states of two body Schrödinger operators – a review. online PDF; 377 kB.
  - pp. 327–349: Quantum dynamics: from automorphism to hamiltonian. online PDF; 573 kB.
- Functional integration and quantum physics (= Pure and Applied Mathematics. 86). Academic Press, New York NY etc. 1979, ISBN 0-12-644250-9 (2nd edition: American Mathematical Society, Providence RI 2005, ISBN 0-8218-3582-3).
- Trace Ideals and their applications (= London Mathematical Society. Lecture Note Series. 35). Cambridge University Press, Cambridge etc. 1979, ISBN 0-521-22286-9 (2nd edition: (= Mathematical Surveys and Monographs. 120). American Mathematical Society, Providence RI 2005, ISBN 0-8218-3581-5).
- with Hans L. Cycon, Richard G. Froese, and Werner Kirsch: Schrödinger Operators. Springer, Berlin etc. 1987, ISBN 3-540-16758-7 (corrected and extended 2nd printing: Springer 2008, ISBN 978-3-540-16758-7).
- The Statistical mechanics of lattice gases. vol. 1. Princeton University Press, Princeton NJ 1993, ISBN 0-691-08779-2.
- Orthogonal polynomials on the unit circle (= American Mathematical Society Colloquium Publications. 54, 1–2). 2 vols. American Mathematical Society, Providence RI 2005;
  - vol. 1: Classical theory. 2005, ISBN 0-8218-3446-0;
  - vol. 2: Spectral theory. 2005, ISBN 0-8218-3675-7.
- Convexity. An analytic viewpoint (= Cambridge Tracts in Mathematics. 187). Cambridge University Press, Cambridge etc. 2011, ISBN 1-107-00731-3.
- Szegő´s theorem and its descendants. Spectral theory for $L^2$ perturbations of orthogonal polynomials. Princeton University Press, Princeton NJ 2011, ISBN 978-0-691-14704-8.
- A Comprehensive Course in Analysis. 4 vols. with vol. 2 published in 2 parts, American Mathematical Society, Providence RI 2015, ISBN 978-1-4704-1098-8.
  - vol. 1: Real Analysis.
  - vol. 2A: Basic Complex Analysis.
  - vol. 2B: Advanced Complex Analysis.
  - vol. 3: Harmonic Analysis.
  - vol. 4: Operator Theory.
- Loewner's theorem on monotone matrix functions Springer, 2019, ISBN 978-3-030-22421-9

== See also ==
- Simon problems
