= Bruno Nachtergaele =

Belgian mathematical physicist

Bruno Leo Zulma Nachtergaele (24 June 1962 in Oudenaarde) is a Belgian mathematical physicist.

Nachtergaele studied physics with a licentiate degree in 1984 from the Katholieke Universiteit Leuven. There, he was awarded, in 1987, a doctorate in theoretical physics under André Verbeure with a dissertation Exacte resultaten voor het spin-Boson model (Exact results for the spin boson model), written in Dutch. From 1989 to 1990 Nachtergaele was an instructor at the University of Chile. At Princeton University, where he worked with Elliott Lieb, Nachtergaele was from 1991 to 1993 an instructor and from 1993 to 1996 an assistant professor of physics. At the University of California, Davis, he was from 1996 to 2000 an associate professor and has since 2000 been a full professor of mathematics. From 2007 to 2010, he was the chair of the Mathematics Department of the University of California, Davis.

His research concerns the mathematical physics of equilibrium and nonequilibrium statistical mechanics, quantum spin systems, and quantum information.

He was elected in 2012 a Fellow of the American Mathematical Society and in 2007 a Fellow of the American Association for the Advancement of Science. In 2002 in Beijing he was an Invited Speaker, with Horng-Tzer Yau, at the International Congress of Mathematicians with talk Derivation of the Euler equations from many-body quantum mechanics.

He was co-editor of 2 volumes of selecta of Elliott Lieb.

== Selected publications ==
- with John Hunter: Applied Analysis, World Scientific 2001
- with Mark Fannes & André Verbeure: The equilibrium states of the spin-boson model, Comm. Math. Phys., 114, 1988, 537–548, 1988, Project Euclid
- with Mark Fannes & Reinhard Werner: Finitely Correlated States on Quantum Spin Chains, Comm. Math. Phys. 144, 1992, 443–490, Project Euclid
- with Michael Aizenman: Geometric Aspects of Quantum Spin States, Commun. Math. Phys., 164, 1994, 17–63, Arxiv
- with Elliott Lieb: The Stability of the Peierls Instability for Ring-Shaped Molecules, Phys. Rev. B, 51, 1995, 4777–4791, Arxiv
- with Horng-Tzer Yau: Derivation of the Euler Equations from Quantum Dynamics , Commun. Math. Phys., 243, 2003, 485–540, Arxiv
- wit Robert Sims: Recent progress in quantum spin systems , in J.T. Lewis Markov Processes and related fields 2007
- Quantum Spin Systems, Encyclopedia of Mathematical Physics, Elsevier 2006, Arxiv
