= Pavel Exner =

Czech mathematical physicist

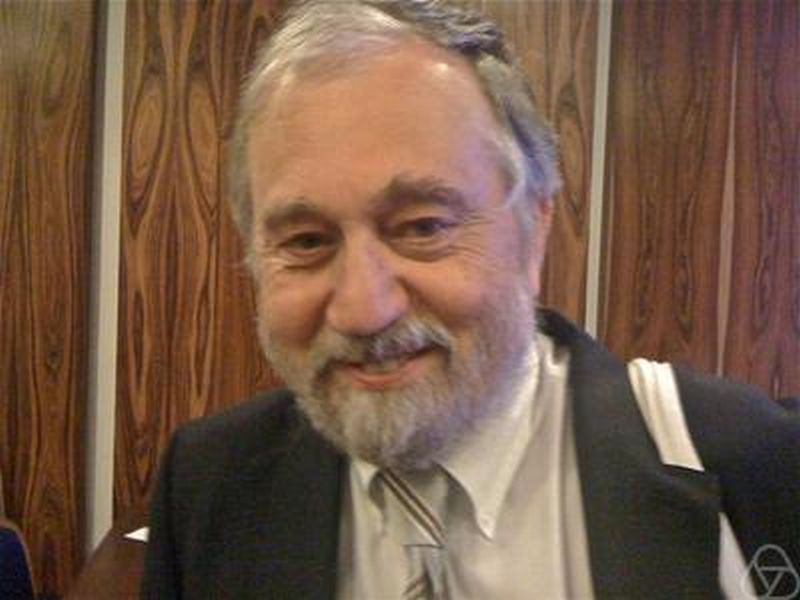
- Sofia 2010
- Born: March 30, 1946 (age 80); Prague, Czechoslovakia
- Education: Charles University
- Awards: JINR Prize (1985) Academia Europaea membership (2010) The Neuron prize (2016)
- Scientific career
- Fields: Mathematical physics
- Website: http://people.fjfi.cvut.cz/exnerpav/

Pavel Exner (born 30 March 1946 in Prague) is a Czech mathematical physicist.

== Life ==
Born on March 30, 1946, in Prague, his parents were Vilem Exner, economist, and Marie, born Karvankova, ophthalmologist. He graduated in 1969 in theoretical physics from the Charles University in Prague.

After working at the Charles University as an assistant professor, he moved in 1978 to the Joint Institute for Nuclear Research, Dubna in Russia. Due to peculiarities of the time he had no doctoral advisor and got his PhD only in 1983; still in Dubna he also got the higher doctorate in mathematical physics in 1990.

Back to his home country in 1991 he became head of a mathematical-physics group in the Nuclear Physics Institute AS CR of the Czech Academy of Sciences. In 2003 he became professor of the Charles University. Since 2006 he works as the Scientific Director of the Doppler Institute for Mathematical Physics and Applied Mathematics at FNSPE CTU in Prague.

Since 1971 he is married to Jana, born Wiendlova, physicist. They have three daughters and five grandchildren.

== Scientific work ==
His scientific interests concern in the first place mathematical problems and methods of quantum theory, in particular, unstable systems and resonances, scattering theory, functional integration, and quantum mechanics on graphs, surfaces, quantum waveguides.

His best known results include existence of curvature-induced states in quantum waveguides, solvable models of quantum systems with contact interactions, and the theory of leaky quantum graphs.

He was awarded various prizes, among them JINR Prize in theoretical physics and the Neuron Prize for outstanding contributions to science. In 2010 he was elected member of Academia Europaea.

His bibliography includes several books and more than two hundred research papers. His best known results include existence of curvature-induced states in quantum waveguides, solvable models of quantum systems with contact interactions, and approximations of vertex couplings in quantum graphs.

== Professional service ==
He supervised eight PhD students and a number of postdocs.

Member of several professional societies, he served on the Executive Committee of the European Mathematical Society in 2002-10, later in 2015-18 as the EMS president.

He served on IUPAP commission for mathematical physics (2002-08), and International Association for Mathematical Physics where he was President in 2009-11.

In 2005 he became a founding member of the European Research Council, in 2011-14 he served as its Vicepresident for the Physical Sciences and Engineering Domain.

Member of several editorial boards, organizer of numerous conferences including the QMath series and the International Congress on Mathematical Physics in 2009.

== Selected writings ==
- P. Exner: Open Quantum Systems and Feynman Integrals, D. Reidel, Dordrecht 1985. https://www.springer.com/gp/book/9789027716781
- J. Blank, P. Exner, M. Havlíček: Hilbert-Space Operators in Quantum Physics. Second edition, revised and extended, Springer, Dordrecht 2008. https://www.springer.com/gp/book/9781402088698
- P. Exner, H. Kovařík: Quantum Waveguides, Springer International, Heidelberg 2015. https://www.springer.com/us/book/9783319185750
- J.F. Brasche, P. Exner, Yu.A. Kuperin, P. Šeba: Schrödinger operators with singular interactions, J. Math. Anal. Appl. 184 (1994), 112-139. https://doi.org/10.1006/jmaa.1994.1188
- P. Duclos, P. Exner: Curvature-induced bound states in quantum waveguides in two and three dimensions, Rev. Math. Phys. 7 (1995), 73-102. https://www.worldscientific.com/doi/abs/10.1142/S0129055X95000062
- P. Exner, O. Post: Convergence of spectra of graph-like thin manifolds, J. Geom. Phys. 54 (2005), 77-115. https://doi.org/10.1016/j.geomphys.2004.08.003
