= Arthur Jaffe =

American mathematician (born 1937)

Arthur M. Jaffe
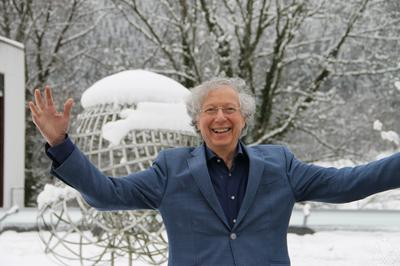
- Jaffe at Oberwolfach in 2017
- Born: December 22, 1937 (age 88)
- Education: Princeton University; Clare College, Cambridge
- Known for: Constructive quantum field theory Jaffe–Lesniewski–Osterwalder cocycle
- Awards: Dannie Heineman Prize (1980); ICM Speaker (1978); Guggenheim Fellowship (1977)
- Scientific career
- Fields: Mathematical physics
- Workplaces: Harvard University
- Doctoral advisor: Arthur Wightman
- Doctoral students: Ezra Getzler; Joel Feldman; Clifford Taubes

Arthur Michael Jaffe (/ˈdʒæfi/; born December 22, 1937) is an American mathematical physicist at Harvard University, where in 1985 he succeeded George Mackey as the Landon T. Clay Professor of Mathematics and Theoretical Science.

== Education and career ==
After graduating from Pelham Memorial High School in 1955, Jaffe attended Princeton University as an undergraduate obtaining a degree in chemistry in 1959, and later Clare College, Cambridge, as a Marshall Scholar, obtaining a degree in mathematics in 1961. He then returned to Princeton, obtaining a doctorate in physics in 1966 with Arthur Wightman. His whole career has been spent teaching mathematical physics and pursuing research at Harvard University. Jaffe was appointed as Professor of Physics in 1970, and had his title changed to Professor of Mathematical Physics in 1974. As part of this transition, Jaffe became a member of the mathematics department. He served as chair from 1987 to 1990.

Arthur Jaffe's 30 doctoral students include Joel Feldman, Ezra Getzler, Clifford Taubes, Eugene Wayne, John Imbrie, Christopher King, and Jonathan Weitsman. In total, Jaffe has over 300 mathematical descendants. He has had many post-doctoral collaborators, including Robert Schrader, Konrad Osterwalder, Juerg Froehlich, Roland Sénéor, Thomas Spencer, Antti Kupiainen, Krzysztof Gawedzki, Tadeusz Balaban, Andrew Lesniewski, Slawomir Klimek, Zhengwei Liu, and Kaifeng Bu.

For several years Jaffe was president of the International Association of Mathematical Physics, and later of the American Mathematical Society. He chaired the Council of Scientific Society Presidents. He served as chair of the board of the Dublin Institute for Advanced Studies, School of Theoretical Physics, from 2005 to 2020.

Jaffe conceived the idea of the Clay Mathematics Institute and its programs, including the employment of research fellows and the Millennium Prizes in mathematics. He served as a founding member, a founding member of the board, and the founding president of that organization.

Arthur Jaffe began as chief editor of Communications in Mathematical Physics in 1979 and served for 21 years until 2001. He served as distinguished visiting professor at the Academy of Mathematics and Systems Science of the Chinese Academy of Sciences.

== Research ==
=== Nonpositivity of Energy Density ===
One of Arthur Jaffe's earliest contributions was his proof, joint with Henry Epstein and Vladimir Glaser, that energy densities in local quantum field theories are always nonpositive.

=== Constructive Quantum Field Theory ===
A large amount of Jaffe's work deals with the mathematical construction and proof of results in quantum field theory. Jaffe began his research on the topic in the late 1960s and early 1970s, at which point the only local quantum field theory which had been constructed mathematically was the free field model. In a series of landmark papers, Jaffe and collaborators made great progress in understanding the nature of quantum field theory. This culminated in the first ever mathematical local quantum field theory with non-linearity and non-trivial scattering. Thus it established the mathematical compatibility of special relativity, quantum theory, and interaction. For this work, Jaffe and James Glimm are acknowledged as the founders of the subject of constructive quantum field theory.

=== Phase Transitions in Quantum Field Theory ===
Another notable contribution of Jaffe's is his proof, joint with James Glimm and Thomas Spencer, that quantum field theories can have phase transitions. While physicists had conjectured for many years that this phenomenon took place, Jaffe-Glimm-Spencer's work gave the first mathematical proof. This work is also notable for using the formalism of reflection positivity to establish its results, which has since become common practice among researchers studying phase transitions in quantum field theory.

=== Reflection Positivity ===
One recurring idea in Jaffe's works is the notion of reflection positivity, which was first introduced by Osterwalder and Schrader while they were Jaffe's post-doctoral fellows. The notion of reflection positivity has served since its inception as a key tool in the quantization of classical Euclidean field theories into relativistic quantum field theories. It also provides a basic tool to study phase transitions both in statistical physics as well as in quantum field theory. Jaffe has made major contributions to the development of this theory, by establishing key examples, introducing important generalizations, and providing geometric interpretations.

=== Higgs Effect ===
Jaffe is also known for his mathematical proof of an aspect of the abelian Higgs mechanism. Namely, he showed that symmetry breaking in the abelian Higgs model induces a gap in the mass spectrum.

=== Supersymmetric Models ===
Within his work on supersymmetric quantum field theories Jaffe is most known for introducing the JLO cocycle, along with collaborators Andrzej Lesniewski and Konrad Osterwalder. The JLO construction takes as input a supersymmetric quantum field theory (mathematically, a θ-summable spectral triple) and outputs a cocycle in Alain Connes' cyclic cohomology.

=== Quantum Information ===
In his later years Arthur Jaffe has made varied contributions to the theory of quantum information, along with postdoctoral researchers Zhengwei Liu, Kaifeng Bu, and students. Notable among these contributions are the introduction of quantum Fourier analysis, the study of quantum resources, quantum error correction, and the introduction of a 3D graphical language for quantum information.

=== Philosophy of Mathematics and Physics ===
Jaffe is the author of several essays on the philosophy of mathematics and physics, with a special emphasis on the role of proof and rigor in these subjects. The most influential of these works was his essay with Frank Quinn, which introduced the notion of "Theoretical Mathematics". An issue of the Bulletin of the American Mathematical Society was devoted to responses to this article, written by leading mathematicians.

== Awards and honors ==
Arthur Jaffe is the recipient of numerous awards and honors. In 1979 he was awarded the New York Academy of Science prize in Mathematics and Physics. In 1980 Arthur Jaffe was awarded the Dannie Heineman Prize for Mathematical Physics. In 1990 he was awarded the Medal Collège de France. In 2018 he was awarded the ICCM prize for best mathematical paper in the last five years. In 2020 he was awarded the Science China Mathematics Award for best editor. Jaffe has been an invited speak at many distinguished conferences, including the 1978 International Congress of Mathematicians at Helsinki.

Additionally, Jaffe is a fellow of many mathematical societies, including the Hagler Institute for Advanced Study, American Physical Society, Society of Industrial and Applied Mathematicians, American Mathematical Society, American Association for the Advancement of Science. He is a member of the American Academy of Arts and Sciences, US National Academy of Sciences, and an honorary member of the Royal Irish Academy.

== Personal life ==
Jaffe was married from 1971 to 1992 to Nora Frances Crow, Ph.D., professor of English literature at Smith College. They had one daughter, Margaret Collins, born in 1986. Jaffe was married to artist Sarah Robbins Warren from 1992 to 2002.
