= David Brydges =

British mathematical physicist

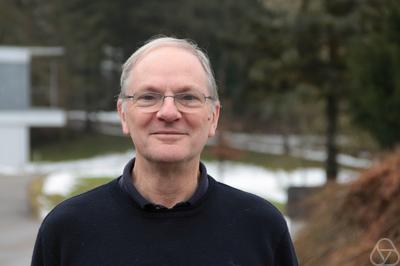
Brydges at Oberwolfach in 2017

David Chandos Brydges (born 1 July 1949 in Chester, UK) is a mathematical physicist.

Brydges received in 1976 his Ph.D. from the University of Michigan with thesis advisor Paul Federbush and thesis A Linear Lower Bound for Generalized Yukawa Model Field Theories. Brydges was a professor at the University of Virginia and is now a professor emeritus (formerly holding a Canada Research Chair) at the University of British Columbia in Vancouver.

Brydges is concerned with mathematical quantum field theory and statistical mechanics. His research deals with functional integral techniques (including supersymmetry techniques), cluster development techniques, renormalization group methods on problems of static mechanics, and probabilistic problems. In 1985 he and Thomas C. Spencer introduced "lace expansion" for the analysis of the self-avoiding walk.

From 2003 to 2005, Brydges was president of International Association of Mathematical Physics. In 2007, he was elected a Fellow of the Royal Society of Canada. In 2010 he was, with Gordon Slade, an Invited Speaker at the International Congress of Mathematicians in Hyderabad. In 2024, he received the Henri Poincaré Prize from the International Association of Mathematical Physics and the Dannie Heineman Prize for Mathematical Physics from the American Physical Society and the American Institute of Physics.

== Selected publications ==
- Brydges, David; Fröhlich, Jürg; Seiler, Erhard (1979). "On the construction of quantized gauge fields. I. General results". Annals of Physics. 121 (1): 227. Bibcode:1979AnPhy.121..227B. doi:10.1016/0003-4916(79)90098-8.
- Brydges, David C.; Fröhlich, Jürg; Seiler, Erhard (1980). "Construction of quantised gauge fields: II. Convergence of the lattice approximation". Communications in Mathematical Physics. 71 (2): 159. Bibcode:1980CMaPh..71..159B. doi:10.1007/BF01197918. S2CID 127953558.
- Brydges, David C.; Fröhlich, Jürg; Seiler, Erhard (1981). "On the construction of quantized gauge fields: III. The two-dimensional abelian higgs model without cutoffs". Communications in Mathematical Physics. 79 (3): 353. Bibcode:1981CMaPh..79..353B. doi:10.1007/BF01208500.
- Brydges, David C. (1978). "A rigorous approach to Debye screening in dilute classical coulomb systems". Communications in Mathematical Physics. 58 (3): 313–350. Bibcode:1978CMaPh..58..313B. doi:10.1007/BF01614227. S2CID 122030703.
- Brydges, David; Federbush, Paul (1978). "A new form of the Mayer expansion in classical statistical mechanics". Journal of Mathematical Physics. 19 (10): 2064. Bibcode:1978JMP....19.2064B. doi:10.1063/1.523586.
- Brydges, David C.; Federbush, Paul (1980). "Debye screening". Communications in Mathematical Physics. 73 (3): 197. Bibcode:1980CMaPh..73..197B. doi:10.1007/BF01197700. hdl:2027.42/46519. S2CID 189831842.
- Brydges, David C.; Federbush, Paul (1981). "Debye Screening in Classical Coulomb Systems". Rigorous Atomic and Molecular Physics. pp. 371–439. doi:10.1007/978-1-4613-3350-0_9. ISBN 978-1-4613-3352-4.
- Brydges, David; Fröhlich, Jürg; Spencer, Thomas (1982). "The random walk representation of classical spin systems and correlation inequalities". Communications in Mathematical Physics. 83 (1): 123. Bibcode:1982CMaPh..83..123B. doi:10.1007/BF01947075. S2CID 56021547.
- Brydges, David C. (1986). "A short course on cluster expansions" (PDF). In Osterwalder, K.; Stora, R. (eds.). Les Houches, Session XLIII, 1984. Elsevier Science Publishers B. V.
- Brydges, David; Spencer, Thomas (1985). "Self-avoiding walk in 5 or more dimensions". Communications in Mathematical Physics. 97 (1–2): 125. Bibcode:1985CMaPh..97..125B. doi:10.1007/BF01206182. S2CID 189832287.
- Brydges, David C.; Martin, Ph. A (1999). "Coulomb Systems at Low Density: A Review". Journal of Statistical Physics. 96 (5–6): 1163. arXiv:cond-mat/9904122. Bibcode:1999JSP....96.1163B. doi:10.1023/A:1004600603161. S2CID 54979869.
