= Kasia Rejzner =

Polish mathematical physicist (born 1985)

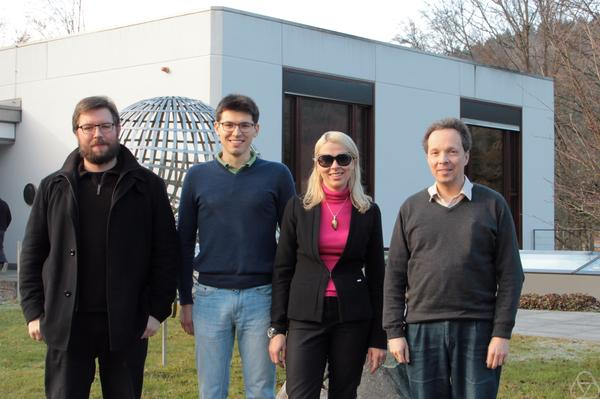
Alexander Schenkel, Marco Benini, Kasia Rejzner, and Christoph Schweigert at Oberwolfach for the 2016 mini-workshop New Interactions between Homotopical Algebra and Quantum Field Theory

Katarzyna (Kasia) Anna Rejzner (born 1985) is a Polish-British mathematical physicist specializing in algebraic quantum field theory and the theory of renormalization, including the Batalin–Vilkovisky formalism. She works as a professor in mathematics at the University of York.

== Education and career ==
Rejzner was born in 1985 in Kraków, the daughter of two architects. She earned a master's degree in physics in 2009 from Jagiellonian University, and completed her Ph.D. in 2011 at the University of Hamburg under the supervision of Klaus Fredenhagen, with a dissertation on the Batalin–Vilkovisky formalism. After postdoctoral studies at the University of Rome Tor Vergata she joined the University of York in 2013, and was promoted to senior lecturer there in 2017. In 2016 and 2017, she visited the Perimeter Institute as an Emmy Noether Visiting Fellow. She was promoted to the position of full professor in Mathematics, University of York in 2024. During the term 2024-2026, Rejzner serves as the President of the International Association of Mathematical Physics (IAMP), being the first female in this position since the foundation of the IAMP.

== Book ==
Rejzner is the author of the book Perturbative Algebraic Quantum Field Theory: An Introduction for Mathematicians (Mathematical Physics Studies, Springer, 2016).
