= Jeffery–Williams Prize =

The Jeffery–Williams Prize is a mathematics award presented annually by the Canadian Mathematical Society. The award is presented to individuals in recognition of outstanding contributions to mathematical research. The first award was presented in 1968. The prize was named in honor of the mathematicians Ralph Lent Jeffery and Lloyd Williams.

== Recipients of the Jeffery–Williams Prize ==
Source: Canadian Mathematical Society

- 2025 Ján Mináč
- 2024 Catherine Sulem
- 2023 V. Kumar Murty
- 2022 André Joyal
- 2021 Joel Kamnitzer
- 2020 Juncheng Wei
- 2019 Jeremy Quastel
- 2018 Gordon Slade
- 2017 Robert McCann
- 2016 Daniel Wise
- 2015 Alejandro Adem
- 2014 Askold Khovanskii
- 2013 Zinovy Reichstein
- 2012 Roland Speicher
- 2011 Kai Behrend
- 2010 Mikhail Lyubich
- 2009 Stephen S. Kudla
- 2008 Martin Barlow
- 2007 Nassif Ghoussoub
- 2006 Andrew Granville
- 2005 Pierre Milman
- 2005 Edward Bierstone
- 2004 Joel Feldman
- 2003 M. Ram Murty
- 2002 Edwin Perkins
- 2001 David Boyd
- 2000 Not Awarded
- 1999 John Friedlander
- 1998 George Elliott
- 1997 Stephen Halperin
- 1996 Mark Goresky
- 1995 R. V. Moody
- 1994 D. Dawson
- 1993 James Arthur
- 1992 I. M. Sigal
- 1991 Peter Lancaster
- 1990 Robert Steinberg
- 1989 E. C. Milner
- 1988 Joachim Lambek
- 1987 Louis Nirenberg
- 1986 C. Herz
- 1985 Laurent C. Siebenmann
- 1984 Cathleen Synge Morawetz
- 1983 Raoul Bott
- 1982 Joseph Lipman
- 1981 Jerrold E. Marsden
- 1980 Robert Langlands
- 1979 Israel Halperin
- 1978 G. Gratzer
- 1977 George F. D. Duff
- 1976 Max Wyman
- 1975 Nathan Saul Mendelsohn
- 1974 Hans J. Zassenhaus
- 1973 Harold Scott MacDonald Coxeter
- 1972 Philip J. Davis
- 1971 W. T. Tutte
- 1970 W. A. J. Luxemburg
- 1969 R. Pyke
- 1968 Irving Kaplansky

== See also ==
- List of mathematics awards
