= Dannie Heineman Prize for Mathematical Physics =

Award conferred by the APS and the AIP

Dannie Heineman Prize for Mathematical Physics is an award given each year since 1959 jointly by the American Physical Society and American Institute of Physics. It is established by the Heineman Foundation in honour of Dannie Heineman. As of 2010, the prize consists of US$10,000 and a certificate citing the contributions made by the recipient plus travel expenses to attend the meeting at which the prize is bestowed.

== Past Recipients ==
Source: American Physical Society

- 2026 Charles Thorn
- 2025 Samson Shatashvili
- 2024 David C. Brydges
- 2023 Nikita Nekrasov
- 2022 Antti Kupiainen and Krzysztof Gawędzki
- 2021 Joel Lebowitz
- 2020 Svetlana Jitomirskaya
- 2019 T. Bill Sutherland, Francesco Calogero and Michel Gaudin
- 2018 Barry Simon
- 2017 Carl M. Bender
- 2016 Andrew Strominger and Cumrun Vafa
- 2015 Pierre Ramond
- 2014 Gregory W. Moore
- 2013 Michio Jimbo and Tetsuji Miwa
- 2012 Giovanni Jona-Lasinio
- 2011 Herbert Spohn
- 2010 Michael Aizenman
- 2009 Carlo Becchi, Alain Rouet, Raymond Stora and Igor Tyutin
- 2008 Mitchell Feigenbaum
- 2007 Juan Maldacena and Joseph Polchinski
- 2006 Sergio Ferrara, Daniel Z. Freedman and Peter van Nieuwenhuizen
- 2005 Giorgio Parisi
- 2004 Gabriele Veneziano
- 2003 Yvonne Choquet-Bruhat and James W. York
- 2002 Michael B. Green and John Henry Schwarz
- 2001 Vladimir Igorevich Arnold
- 2000 Sidney R. Coleman
- 1999 Barry M. McCoy, Tai Tsun Wu and Alexander B. Zamolodchikov
- 1998 Nathan Seiberg and Edward Witten
- 1997 Harry W. Lehmann
- 1996 Roy J. Glauber
- 1995 Roman W. Jackiw
- 1994 Richard Arnowitt, Stanley Deser and Charles W. Misner
- 1993 Martin C. Gutzwiller
- 1992 Stanley Mandelstam
- 1991 Thomas C.Spencer and Jürg Fröhlich
- 1990 Yakov Sinai
- 1989 John S. Bell
- 1988 Julius Wess and Bruno Zumino
- 1987 Rodney Baxter
- 1986 Alexander M. Polyakov
- 1985 David P. Ruelle
- 1984 Robert B. Griffiths
- 1983 Martin D. Kruskal
- 1982 John Clive Ward
- 1981 Jeffrey Goldstone
- 1980 James Glimm and Arthur Jaffe
- 1979 Gerard 't Hooft
- 1978 Elliott Lieb
- 1977 Steven Weinberg
- 1976 Stephen Hawking
- 1975 Ludwig D. Faddeev
- 1974 Subrahmanyan Chandrasekhar
- 1973 Kenneth G. Wilson
- 1972 James D. Bjorken
- 1971 Roger Penrose
- 1970 Yoichiro Nambu
- 1969 Arthur S. Wightman
- 1968 Sergio Fubini
- 1967 Gian Carlo Wick
- 1966 Nikolai N. Bogoliubov
- 1965 Freeman Dyson
- 1964 Tullio Regge
- 1963 Keith A. Brueckner
- 1962 Léon Van Hove
- 1961 Marvin Leonard Goldberger
- 1960 Aage Bohr
- 1959 Murray Gell-Mann

== See also ==
- Dannie Heineman Prize for Astrophysics
- List of mathematics awards
- List of physics awards
- Prizes named after people
