= Benjamin Schlein =

Italian mathematician

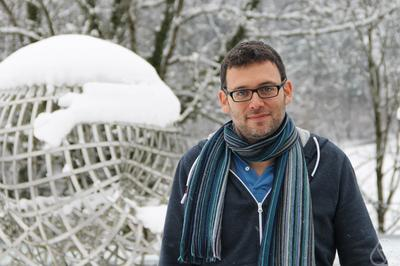
Benjamin Schlein in 2017 in Oberwolfach.

Benjamin Schlein (born 28 May 1975 in Lugano) is a Swiss-born Italian mathematician and professor at the University of Zurich. Schlein's research is in mathematical physics. He works in mathematical analysis of many-body quantum systems and random matrix theory.

== Career ==
Schlein studied theoretical physics at ETH Zurich and received his PhD in 2002 under the supervision of Jürg Fröhlich. From 2004 to 2005 he was an NSF Postdoctoral Fellow at Stanford University and from 2005 to 2006 at Harvard University. From 2006 to 2007 he was an assistant professor at University of California, Davis. During 2007-2008 he was a Research Fellow, supported by Kovalevskaja Award at LMU Munich. From 2007 to 2010 he was a lecturer at Cambridge University. From 2010 to 2014 he was a Hausdorff Chair at the University of Bonn in Germany. He has been a professor at the University of Zurich since 2014.

He was one of the four editors-in-chief of the Journal of Functional Analysis in 2022–24. As of 2025 he is still part of the editorial board.

== Awards and honors ==
In 2006, Schlein received the Sofja Kovalevskaja Award from the Alexander von Humboldt Foundation. In 2009, he was awarded the Young Scientist Prize of the International Union of Pure and Applied Physics (IUPAP) for outstanding results in mathematical analysis of many-body quantum systems, in particular, Bose gases. In 2018, Schlein was an invited speaker at the International Congress of Mathematicians. In 2026 he was awarded the Leroy P. Steele Prize for Seminal Contribution to Research of the AMS.

== Personal life ==
He is the brother of Italian politician Elly Schlein.
