= Nilanjana Datta =

Indian-born British mathematician

- Education: ETH Zürich (PhD); Jadavpur University (BSc, MSc)
- Scientific career
- Fields: Mathematical physics; Quantum information; Quantum statistical mechanics
- Workplaces: University of Cambridge; École Polytechnique Fédérale de Lausanne; University of Strathclyde; Dublin Institute for Advanced Studies; CNRS Marseille
- Thesis: Low-temperature phase diagrams of quantum lattice systems and Properties of the edge of the Laughlin liquid
- Doctoral advisor: Jürg Fröhlich, Rudolf Morf
- Website: http://www.damtp.cam.ac.uk/user/nila/

Nilanjana Datta is an Indian-born British mathematician. She is a Professor in Quantum Information Theory in the Department of Applied Mathematics and Theoretical Physics at the University of Cambridge, and a Fellow of Pembroke College.

Born in the Indian state of West Bengal, Datta graduated from Jadavpur University with a Master of Science and did a Post-MSc at the Saha Institute of Nuclear Physics. In 1995 she obtained a PhD from ETH Zürich under the supervision of Jürg Fröhlich and Rudolf Morf, working on quantum statistical mechanics and the Quantum Hall effect. She then held postdoctoral positions at the CNRS Marseille, the Dublin Institute for Advanced Studies, the University of Strathclyde, and the École Polytechnique Fédérale de Lausanne. In 2001 she became an affiliated lecturer of the Faculty of Mathematics, University of Cambridge and a Fellow of Pembroke College.

After moving to Cambridge, Datta focused her research on the field of quantum information theory, contributing to topics such as quantum state transfer, memory effects in quantum information theory, and one-shot quantum information theory. Her collaborators include Artur Ekert, Jürg Fröhlich, Alexander Holevo, Richard Jozsa, Mary Beth Ruskai, Mark Wilde, and Andreas Winter.

Datta is the founder of the Beyond i.i.d. in Information Theory Conferences series, which started in January 2013 in Cambridge, UK and has continued on an annual basis since then. The main goal of the conference, in which Datta has played a central role, is to bring together the various research communities working on quantum Shannon theory, quantum resource theories, classical information theory, and mathematical physics related to entropies and information, in order to encourage the exchange of research and foster collaborations.
