= Joel Feldman =

Joel Shalom Feldman (born 14 June 1949, in Ottawa) is a Canadian mathematical physicist and mathematician.

Feldman studied mathematics and physics at the University of Toronto with bachelor's degree in 1970 and at Harvard University with master's degree in 1971 and with PhD in 1974 under Arthur Jaffe with thesis The $\lambda \cdot {\Phi}^{4}_{3}$ field theory in a finite volume. In 1974–1975 he did research at Harvard on constructive quantum field theory and was from 1975 to 1977 a Moore Instructor at MIT. At the University of British Columbia he became in 1977 an assistant professor, in 1982 an associate professor, and in 1987 a professor.

Feldman received in 1996 the John L. Synge Award, in 2007 the CRM-Fields-PIMS Prize, in 2007 the CAP-CRM Prize, and in 2004 the Jeffery-Williams Prize. From 1989 to 1991 he was a Killam Fellow and he was a Woodrow Wilson Fellow. In 2007 he was a Fellow at the Fields Institute.

Feldman works on constructive quantum field theory (with some work in collaboration with Vincent Rivasseau, Konrad Osterwalder, and Manfred Salmhofer). He also does research on the mathematical theory of Fermi liquids (including Fermi surfaces, superconducting transitions, and explicit construction of Fermi fluids in two dimensions at the zero temperature limit in a long series of articles with Knörrer and Trubowitz) and Bose fluids in quantum many-body theory. With Horst Knörrer and Eugene Trubowitz, Feldman has worked on Riemann surfaces of infinite genus. With Gunther Uhlmann he has written a book on inverse problems.

Feldman became a Fellow of the Royal Society of Canada in 1990. In 1990 in Kyoto he was an invited speaker at the International Congress of Mathematicians with lecture Introduction to constructive quantum field theory. He was an invited speaker in 2003 in Lisbon at the 14th ICMP (Construction of a 2-dimensional Fermi Liquid, from work with Knörrer and Trubowitz). Feldman in 1997 in Brisbane at the 12th ICMP delivered a plenary address (Renormalization of the Fermi surface, from work with Salmhofer and Trubowitz). He was elected as a fellow of the Canadian Mathematical Society in 2019.

From 2005 to 2010 Feldman was editor of the Journal of Mathematical Physics. Since 1999 he is a co-editor of the Annales de l'Institut Henri Poincaré.

Feldman's doctoral students include Gordon Slade.

== Selected publications ==
- with J. Magnen, V. Rivasseau, R. Sénéor: Infrared $\Phi^4_4$, in Osterwalder, Raymond Stora Critical phenomena, random systems, gauge theories, Les Houches 43, North Holland 1986, pp. 505–537
- with Trubowitz: Perturbation theory for many fermion systems, Helvetica Physica Acta, vol. 63, 1990, pp. 156–260
- with T. Hurd, L. Rosen, J. Wright: Quantumelectrodynamics: a proof of renormalizability, Lecture Notes in Physics 312, Springer Verlag 1988
- with Horst Knörrer, Eugene Trubowitz: Riemann Surfaces of Infinite Genus, AMS (American Mathematical Society) 2003
- with Knörrer, Trubowitz: Fermionic functional integrals and the renormalization group, AMS 2002
- with Knörrer, D. Lehmann, Trubowitz: Fermi liquids in 2 space dimensions, in Rivasseau Constructive Physics. Results in Field Theory, Statistical Mechanics and Solid State Physics, Springer Verlag 1995, pp. 267–300
