= Gordon Douglas Slade =

Canadian mathematician

Gordon Slade FRS FRSC
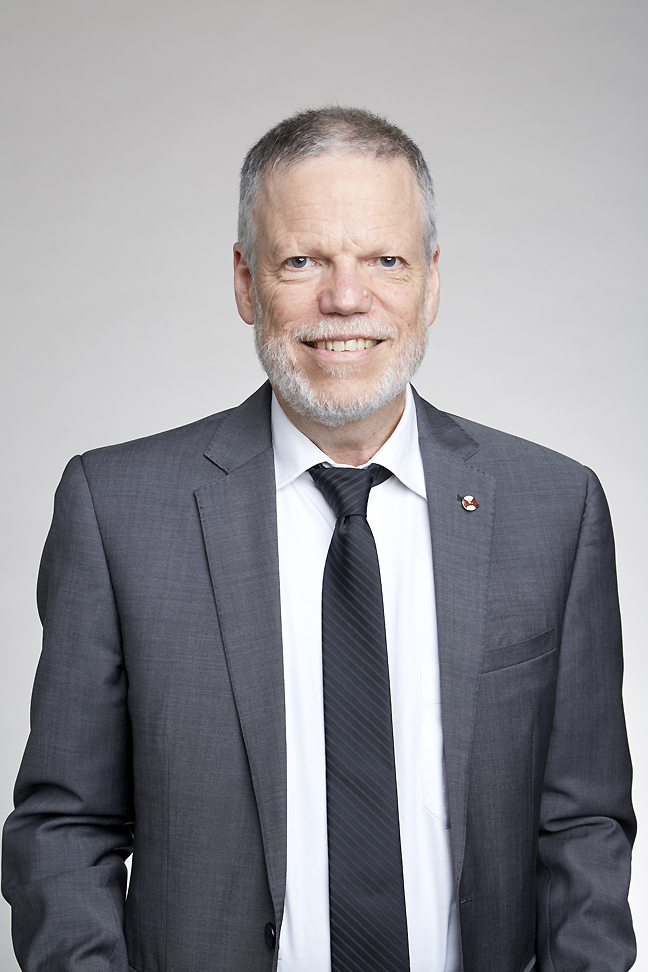
- Slade in 2017
- Born: Gordon Douglas Slade; December 14, 1955 (age 70); Toronto
- Education: University of Toronto; University of British Columbia
- Awards: Coxeter–James Prize (1995); CRM-Fields-PIMS prize (2010); Jeffery–Williams Prize (2018)
- Scientific career
- Workplaces: University of British Columbia; University of Virginia; McMaster University
- Thesis: An Asymptotic Loop Expansion for the Effective Potential in the φ2 Quantum Field Theory (1984)
- Doctoral advisor: Joel Feldman; Lon Rosen
- Website: www.math.ubc.ca/~slade

Gordon Douglas Slade (born December 14, 1955, in Toronto) is a Canadian mathematician, specializing in probability theory.

== Education ==
Slade received in 1977 his bachelor's degree from the University of Toronto and in 1984 his PhD for research supervised by Joel Feldman and Lon Rosen at the University of British Columbia.

== Career and Research ==
As a postdoc he was a lecturer at the University of Virginia. From 1986 he was at McMaster University and since 1999 he is a professor at the University of British Columbia.

He developed the technique of lace expansion (originally introduced by David Brydges and Thomas C. Spencer in 1985) with applications to probability theory and statistical mechanics, such as self-avoiding random walks and their enumeration, random graphs, percolation theory, and branched polymers.

In 1989 Slade proved with Takashi Hara that the Aizenman–Newman triangle condition at critical percolation is valid in sufficiently high dimension. The Hara–Slade result has important consequences in mean field theory.

In 1991 Slade and Hara used the lace expansion to prove that the average distance covered in self-avoiding random walks in 5 or more dimension grows as the square root of the number of steps and that the scaling limit is Brownian motion.

=== Honours and awards ===
Slade was an invited speaker in 1994 at the ICM in Zürich with lecture The critical behaviour of random systems.

Slade received in 1995 the Coxeter–James Prize and in the 2010 the CRM-Fields-PIMS Prize. He was elected a Fellow of the Royal Society of Canada (FRSC) in 2000, in 2010 of the Fields Institute, and in 2012 of the American Mathematical Society and of the Institute of Mathematical Statistics. He was elected a Fellow of the Royal Society in 2017. In 2018 Slade was awarded the Jeffery–Williams Prize.

=== Selected publications ===
- with Neal Madras: Self-avoiding walk, Birkhäuser 1993
- The lace expansion and its applications (École d’Eté de Probabilités de Saint-Flour XXXIV, 2004), Springer Verlag 2006
