= Krzysztof Gawedzki =

Polish mathematical physicist (1947–2022)

Krzysztof Gawędzki
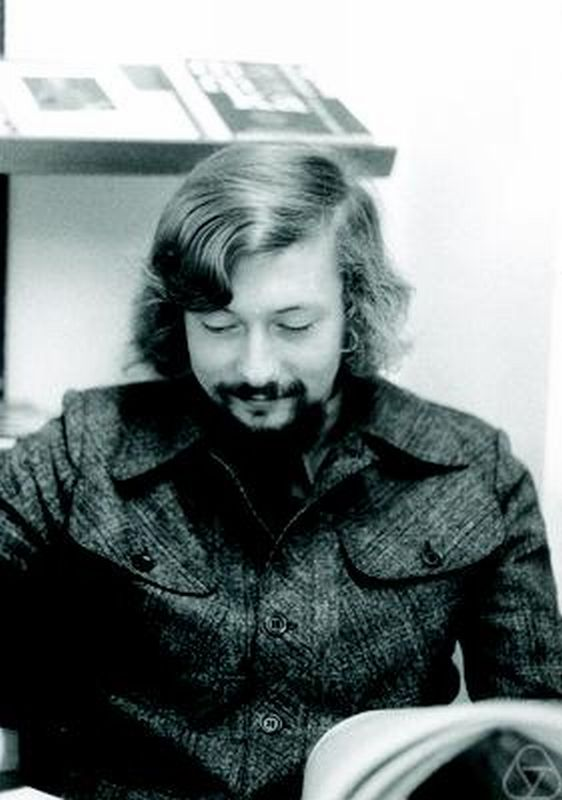
- Gawędzki in Erlangen, 1974
- Born: July 2, 1947; Żarki, Poland
- Died: January 21, 2022 (aged 74); Lyon, France
- Education: University of Warsaw
- Known for: Research on quantum field theory, statistical physics and conformal field theory
- Awards: Dannie Heineman Prize for Mathematical Physics (2022)
- Scientific career
- Fields: Mathematics, Physics
- Workplaces: University of Warsaw; University of Göttingen; University of Gdańsk; Harvard University; École normale supérieure de Lyon

Krzysztof Gawędzki (Polish pronunciation: [ˈkʂɨʂtɔf ɡavɛnt͡ski]; born 2 July 1947 – died 21 January 2022) was a Polish mathematical physicist, a graduate of the University of Warsaw and professor at the École normale supérieure de Lyon (ENS de Lyon). He was primarily known for his research on quantum field theory and statistical physics. In 2022, he shared the Dannie Heineman Prize for Mathematical Physics with Antti Kupiainen.

== Education and career ==
Born in Poland, Gawędzki received in 1971 his doctorate from the University of Warsaw. His doctoral dissertation Functional theory of geodesic fields was supervised by Krzysztof Maurin (1923–2017).

In the 1980s Gawędzki did research at CNRS at the IHES near Paris. Since the 1990s, he was a professor at the École normale supérieure de Lyon (ENS de Lyon), and later an emeritus researcher there.

He was known for his research in the mathematics of quantum field theory (QFT), especially conformal field theory. In the 1980s he collaborated with Antti Kupiainen on the application of the renormalization group method in the rigorous mathematical treatment of various model systems of quantum field theory. Much of their research deals with conformal field theories, which serve as two-dimensional toy models of non-perturbative aspects of QFT (with applications to string theory and statistical mechanics). Gawędzki and collaborators studied the geometry of WZW models (also called WZNW models, Wess-Zumino-Novikov-Witten models), prototypes for rational conformal field theories.

With Kupiainen he succeeded in the 1980s in the rigorous construction of the massless lattice $\phi^4_4$ model in four dimensions and the Gross-Neveu model in two space-time dimensions. At about the same time, this was achieved by Roland Sénéor, Jacques Magnen, Joel Feldman and Vincent Rivasseau. This was considered an outstanding achievement in constructive quantum field theory.

In 1986 Gawędzki identified the Kalb–Ramond field (B field), which generalizes the electromagnetic field from point particles to strings, as a degree-3 cocycle in the Deligne cohomology model.

In the 2000s he did research on turbulence, partly in collaboration with Kupiainen. In 1995 Gawędzki and Kupiainen demonstrated anomalous scaling behavior of scalar advection in random vector field models of homogeneous turbulence.

From January to June 2003 he was at the Institute for Advanced Study. In 1986 he was invited speaker with talk Renormalization: from magic to mathematics at the International Congress of Mathematicians in Berkeley. In 2007 at ENS de Lyon a conference on mathematical physics was held in honor of his 60th birthday. In 2017 at the University of Nice Sophia Antipolis a conference on mathematical physics was held in honor of his 70th birthday.

On 24 November 2021, the American Institute of Physics and the American Physical Society announced Krzysztof Gawędzki and Antti Kupiainen as the recipients of the 2022 Dannie Heineman Prize for Mathematical Physics. They were recognized for their "fundamental contributions to quantum field theory, statistical mechanics, and fluid dynamics using geometric, probabilistic, and renormalization group ideas."

He died in Lyon, France on 21 January 2022, at the age of 74.

== Selected publications ==
- Deligne, P.; Etingof, P.; Freed, D. S.; Jeffrey, L.; Kazhdan, D.; Morgan, J.; Morrison, D. R.; Witten, E., eds. (1999). "Lectures on Conformal Field Theory by K. Gawędzki". Quantum Fields and Strings: A Course for Mathematicians (IAS/Park City Lectures 1996/97). American Mathematical Society. pp. 727–805. ISBN 9780821820148.
- Gawędzki, Krzysztof (1989). "Conformal field theory". Astérisque. Séminaire Bourbaki, Exp. No. 704. 1988/89 (177–178): 95–126. MR 1040570.
- Frohlich, Jurg; Gawedzki, Krzysztof (1994). "Conformal field theory and geometry of strings". Mathematical Quantum Theory I: Field Theory and Many-Body Theory. CRM Proceedings and Lecture Notes. Vol. 7. pp. 57–97. arXiv:hep-th/9310187. doi:10.1090/crmp/007/03. ISBN 9780821803653. S2CID 117189485.
- Gawędzki, Krzysztof (1989). "Quadrature of conformal field theories". Nuclear Physics B. 328 (3): 733–752. Bibcode:1989NuPhB.328..733G. doi:10.1016/0550-3213(89)90228-9.
- Connes, Alain; Gawędzki, K.; Zinn-Justin, Jean, eds. (1998). Quantum Symmetries. Les Houches Lectures, vol. 64 (August/September 1995), Université Joseph Fourier. Elsevier. ISBN 9780444828675.
- Cardy, John; Falkovich, Gregory; Gawędzki, Krzysztof (11 December 2008). Non-equilibrium Statistical Mechanics and Turbulence. London Mathematical Society Lecture Notes Series 355. Cambridge University Press. ISBN 9780521715140.
- Nazarenko, Sergey; Zaboronski, Oleg V., eds. (2008). "Krzysztof Gawędzki. Soluble models of turbulent transport". Non-equilibrium Statistical Mechanics and Turbulence. London Mathematical Society Lecture Notes 355. Cambridge University Press. pp. 44–107. doi:10.1017/CBO9780511812149.003. ISBN 9780511812149.
