= Horng-Tzer Yau =

Taiwanese-American mathematician

- 姚鴻澤
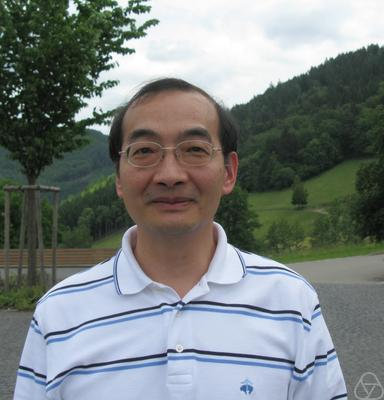
- Yau at Oberwolfach, 2011
- Born: June 29, 1959 (age 67); Taiwan
- Education: National Taiwan University (BS); Princeton University (PhD)
- Awards: Henri Poincaré Prize (2000); MacArthur Fellowship (2000); Morningside Medal (2001)
- Scientific career
- Fields: Mathematical physics
- Workplaces: New York University; Stanford University; Harvard University
- Thesis: Stability of Coulomb Systems (1987)
- Doctoral advisor: Elliott H. Lieb

Horng-Tzer Yau (Chinese: 姚鴻澤; pinyin: Yáo Hóngzé; born June 29, 1959) is a Taiwanese-American mathematician who is the Merton Professor of Mathematics at Harvard University.

== Early life and education ==
Yau was born in 1959 in Taiwan, where he began studying advanced calculus and college algebra in high school. He graduated from National Taiwan University with a Bachelor of Science (B.S.) in 1981. As an undergraduate, he studied differential geometry, real analysis, and complex analysis. After graduation, he served two years of military service in the Republic of China Armed Forces from 1981 to 1983.

In 1987, Yau earned his Ph.D. in mathematics from Princeton University. His doctoral dissertation, completed under mathematical physicist Elliott Lieb, was titled, "Stability of Coulomb Systems". After receiving his doctorate, Yao completed postdoctoral research at the Institute for Advanced Study under David Brydges from 1987 to 1988.

== Academic career ==
In 1988, Yau joined the mathematics faculty at New York University. He became a full professor at its Courant Institute of Mathematical Sciences in 1994. He then moved to Stanford University in 2003, and then to Harvard University in 2005. He was also a member of the Institute for Advanced Study in Princeton, New Jersey, in 2003, and was a distinguished visiting professor there in 2013–14.

According to William C. Kirby, dean of the Faculty of Arts and Sciences at Harvard, "Professor Yau is a leader in the fields of mathematical physics, ... who has introduced important tools and concepts to study probability, stochastic processes, nonequilibrium statistical physics, and quantum dynamics."

Yau is a 2000 MacArthur Fellow.

== Honors ==
- Simons Investigator Award
- Sloan Foundation Fellowship
- Packard Foundation Fellowship, 1991
- International Congress of Mathematicians, 1998
- Henri Poincaré Prize, 2000
- MacArthur Fellowship, 2000
- Morningside Gold Medal of Mathematics, 2001
- Academician of the Academia Sinica, 2002
- Member of the American Academy of Arts and Sciences
- Member of the National Academy of Sciences
- Fellow of the American Mathematical Society, 2012
- Simons Investigator, 2012
- Editor-in-Chief of Communications in Mathematical Physics
- Eisenbud Prize for Mathematics & Physics, 2017
- Leroy P. Steele Prize for Seminal Contribution to Research of the AMS, 2026
