= Joel Kamnitzer =

Canadian mathematician

Academic background
- Education: University of California, Berkeley

Academic work
- Discipline: mathematics
- Institutions: McGill University

Joel Kamnitzer is a Canadian mathematician specializing in geometric representation theory, algebraic geometry and mathematical physics. He is a James McGill Professor in the Department of Mathematics and Statistics at McGill University in Montreal, Quebec. His research focuses on the representation theory of complex reductive groups, the geometric Satake correspondence, categorification and symplectic duality.

Kamnitzer received his PhD from the University of California, Berkeley, in 2005. He subsequently held postdoctoral positions at the Massachusetts Institute of Technology, University of California, Berkeley, and the Mathematical Sciences Research Institute. In 2008, he joined the University of Toronto, where he became a full professor in 2016. He received the Canadian Mathematical Society's Jeffery-Williams Prize in 2021 and was elected a Fellow of the Royal Society of Canada in 2022.

== Education ==
Kamnitzer received his doctoral degree in mathematics from the University of California, Berkeley, in 2005. His doctoral dissertation, Mirković–Vilonen Cycles and Polytopes, was supervised by mathematician Allen Knutson.

His doctoral research examined geometric structures associated with representation theory, particularly Mirković–Vilonen cycles and their relationship with polytopes and canonical bases.

== Academic career ==
Following the completion of his PhD, Kamnitzer held a postdoctoral fellowship at the Massachusetts Institute of Technology from 2005 to 2006. He subsequently worked at the University of California, Berkeley, as a postdoctoral fellow and visiting assistant professor from 2006 to 2008. During 2008, he was also a member of the Mathematical Sciences Research Institute.

In July 2008, Kamnitzer joined the University of Toronto as an assistant professor. He was promoted to associate professor in July 2013 and became a full professor in July 2016. He also held a visiting professorship at the École Polytechnique Fédérale de Lausanne in Switzerland from September 2014 to June 2015.

He later joined McGill University in Montreal, where he holds the title of James McGill Professor in the Department of Mathematics and Statistics.

In addition to his research and teaching, Kamnitzer has held editorial positions in mathematical journals. He has served as managing editor of Mathematische Zeitschrift and as an associate editor of the Canadian Journal of Mathematics and the Canadian Mathematical Bulletin.

== Research ==
Kamnitzer's research lies primarily at the intersection of algebra, geometry and mathematical physics. His work concerns the representation theory of complex reductive groups and the geometric structures used to understand representations of Lie groups and Lie algebras.

His research includes several interconnected areas.

=== Geometric representation theory ===
A central theme of Kamnitzer's research is geometric representation theory, which uses geometric objects and methods to study algebraic representations.

His work on Mirković–Vilonen cycles and polytopes has contributed to the understanding of canonical bases in representation theory. His research in this area also examines the geometric Satake correspondence, which establishes a connection between the geometry of the affine Grassmannian and representations of reductive groups.

His paper Mirković–Vilonen Cycles and Polytopes, published in Annals of Mathematics in 2010, developed an explicit relationship between these geometric objects and combinatorial structures associated with representations.

=== Knot homology and categorification ===
Kamnitzer has collaborated with Sabin Cautis on a geometric approach to knot homology using derived categories of coherent sheaves.

Their research explored connections between knot invariants, algebraic geometry and representation theory. The work was presented in a series of papers titled Knot Homology via Derived Categories of Coherent Sheaves, published beginning in 2008.

Another important aspect of this research is categorification, a mathematical programme that replaces algebraic structures with categories and functors in order to reveal deeper relationships between mathematical objects.

=== Symplectic duality ===
Kamnitzer has also contributed to research on symplectic duality, a theory connecting certain algebraic and geometric structures known as conical symplectic singularities.

This research has links to mathematical physics, particularly three-dimensional supersymmetric gauge theories and their Higgs and Coulomb branches.

In collaboration with other mathematicians, he has investigated the geometry and quantization of slices in the affine Grassmannian, as well as connections with quiver varieties and shifted Yangians.

=== Crystals and representation theory ===
Another area of Kamnitzer's work concerns crystal bases, combinatorial structures used in the study of representations of quantum groups and Lie algebras.

In collaboration with André Henriques, he studied crystals and coboundary categories, exploring connections between combinatorial representation theory and the geometry of moduli spaces.

His research has also examined the relationship between crystal structures, monodromy and Gaudin models.

== Awards and recognition ==
Kamnitzer has received several academic awards and honours for his contributions to mathematics.

- 2011 – André Aisenstadt Prize: Awarded by the Centre de recherches mathématiques (CRM) in recognition of his mathematical research.
- E. W. R. Steacie Memorial Fellowship: A research fellowship awarded by the Natural Sciences and Engineering Research Council of Canada.
- 2021 – Jeffery-Williams Prize: Awarded by the Canadian Mathematical Society for outstanding and sustained contributions to mathematical research by a member of the Canadian mathematical community.
- 2022 – Fellow of the Royal Society of Canada: Elected in recognition of his contributions to mathematics, particularly geometric representation theory and the connections between mathematics and theoretical physics.

== Editorial and academic activities ==
Kamnitzer has participated in the editorial work of several mathematical journals, including Mathematische Zeitschrift, the Canadian Journal of Mathematics and the Canadian Mathematical Bulletin.

He has also organized and participated in international conferences, workshops and research programmes devoted to representation theory, categorification, algebraic geometry and mathematical physics.

He has supervised doctoral students and postdoctoral researchers and has contributed to the development of research in geometric representation theory.

== Selected publications ==
- Henriques, André; Kamnitzer, Joel (2006). "The octahedron recurrence and $\mathfrak{g}l_\mathfrak{n}$ crystals". Advances in Mathematics. 206 (1): 211–249. doi:10.1016/j.aim.2005.08.007.
- Cautis, Sabin; Kamnitzer, Joel (2008). "Knot Homology via derived categories of coherent sheaves, I: The $\mathfrak{sl}(2)$-case". Duke Mathematical Journal. 142 (3): 511–588. doi:10.1215/00127094-2008-012.
- Cautis, Sabin; Kamnitzer, Joel (2008). "Knot homology via derived categories of coherent sheaves II, $\mathfrak{sl}_m$ case". Inventiones mathematicae. 174 (1): 165–232. doi:10.1007/s00222-008-0138-6.
- Kamnitzer, Joel (2010). "Mirković–Vilonen Cycles and Polytopes". Annals of Mathematics. 171 (1): 245–294. doi:10.4007/annals.2010.171.245.
- Cautis, Sabin; Kamnitzer, Joel; Licata, Anthony (2010). "Coherent sheaves and categorical $\mathfrak{sl}_2$ actions". Duke Mathematical Journal. 154 (1): 135–179. doi:10.1215/00127094-2010-035.
- Kamnitzer, Joel; Fontaine, Bruce; Kuperberg, Greg (2013). "Buildings, spiders, and geometric Satake". Compositio Mathematica. 149 (11): 1871–1912. doi:10.1112/S0010437X13007136.
- Cautis, Sabin; Kamnitzer, Joel; Morrison, Scott (2014). "Webs and quantum skew Howe duality". Mathematische Annalen. 360 (1–2): 351–390. doi:10.1007/s00208-013-0984-4.
- Kamnitzer, Joel (2016). "A combinatorial geometric Satake equivalence". Advances in Mathematics. 300: 5–16. doi:10.1016/j.aim.2016.03.014.
- Cautis, Sabin; Kamnitzer, Joel (2018). "Quantum K-theoretic geometric Satake". Compositio Mathematica. 154 (2): 275–327. doi:10.1112/S0010437X17007564.
