= Kupiainen =

Kupiainen is a Finnish surname. Notable people with the surname include:

- Antti Kupiainen (born 1954), Finnish mathematical physicist
- Matias Kupiainen (born 1983), Finnish guitarist, songwriter, and record producer
