= Henri Poincaré Prize =

International prize in mathematical physics

The Henri Poincaré Prize is awarded every three years since 1997 for exceptional achievements in mathematical physics and foundational contributions leading to new developments in the field. It is named after the French mathematician Henri Poincaré. The prize is sponsored by the Daniel Iagolnitzer Foundation and is awarded to approximately three scientists at the International Congress on Mathematical Physics. The prize was also established to support promising young researchers that already made outstanding contributions in mathematical physics.

== Prize recipients ==
Year	ICMP Location	Prize winner
1997	Brisbane	(Germany) Rudolf Haag (Russia) Maxim Kontsevich (United States) Arthur Wightman
2000	London	(United States) Joel Lebowitz (Austria) Walter Thirring (Taiwan) Horng-Tzer Yau
2003	Lisbon	(Japan) Huzihiro Araki (United States) Elliott H. Lieb (Israel) Oded Schramm
2006	Rio de Janeiro	(Russia) Ludvig D. Faddeev (Belgium) (France) David Ruelle (United States) Edward Witten
2009	Prague	(Switzerland) Jürg Fröhlich (Austria) Robert Seiringer (Russia) Yakov G. Sinai (France) Cédric Villani
2012	Aalborg	(France) Nalini Anantharaman (United Kingdom) (United States) Freeman Dyson (France) Sylvia Serfaty (United States) Barry Simon
2015	Santiago	(Russia) (United States) Alexei Borodin (United States) Thomas Spencer (Germany) Herbert Spohn
2018	Montreal	(Israel) (United States) Michael Aizenman (South Africa) (United States) Percy Deift (Italy) Giovanni Gallavotti
2021	Geneva	(Australia) Rodney Baxter (Greece) Demetrios Christodoulou (Japan) Yoshiko Ogata (Denmark) Jan Philip Solovej
2024	Strasbourg	(United Kingdom) David Brydges (Russia) (United States) Alexei Kitaev (Finland) Antti Kupiainen (United States) Scott Sheffield

== See also ==
- List of physics awards
- List of mathematics awards
