= Physical mathematics =

Mathematics inspired by physics

The subject of physical mathematics is concerned with mathematics that is motivated by physics and is considered by some as a subfield of mathematical physics.

== Overview ==
Physically motivated mathematics existed within a tradition of mathematical analysis of nature that goes back to the ancient Greeks. A good example is Archimedes' Method of Mechanical Theorems, where the principle of the balance is used to find results in pure geometry. This tradition, elaborated further by Islamic and Byzantine scholars, was reintroduced to the West in the 12th century and during the Renaissance. It became known as "mixed mathematics" and was a major contributor to the emergence of modern mathematical physics in the 17th century.

The details of physical units and their manipulation were addressed by Alexander Macfarlane in Physical Arithmetic in 1885. The science of kinematics created a need for mathematical representation of motion and has found expression with complex numbers, quaternions, and linear algebra.

At the University of Cambridge the Mathematical Tripos tested students on their knowledge of "mixed mathematics". "... [N]ew books which appeared in the mid-eighteenth century offered a systematic introduction to the fundamental operations of the fluxional calculus and showed how it could be applied to a wide range of mathematical and physical problems. ... The strongly problem-oriented presentation in the treatises ... made it much easier for university students to master the fluxional calculus and its applications [and] helped define a new field of mixed mathematical studies..."

An adventurous expression of physical mathematics is found in Maxwell's A Treatise on Electricity and Magnetism, which used partial differential equations. The text aspired to describe phenomena in four dimensions, but the foundation for this physical world, Minkowski space, trailed by forty years.

String theorist Greg Moore said this about physical mathematics in his vision talk at Strings 2014.

"The use of the term “Physical Mathematics” in contrast to the more traditional “Mathematical Physics” by myself and others is not meant to detract from the venerable subject of Mathematical Physics but rather to delineate a smaller subfield characterized by questions and goals that are often motivated, on the physics side, by quantum gravity, string theory, and supersymmetry, (and more recently by the notion of topological phases in condensed matter physics), and, on the mathematics side, often involve deep relations to infinite-dimensional Lie algebras (and groups), topology, geometry, and even analytic number theory, in addition to the more traditional relations of physics to algebra, group theory, and analysis."

== See also ==
- Theoretical physics
- Mathematical physics
