= Annales Henri Poincaré =

- Discipline: Physics, astronomy
- Language: English
- Edited by: Claude-Alain Pillet (in chief)

Publication details
- History: 2000–present
- Publisher: Springer Science+Business Media
- Impact factor: 1.550 (2020)

Standard abbreviations
- ISO 4: Ann. Henri Poincaré

Indexing
- CODEN: AHPJFM
- ISSN: 1424-0637 (print); 1424-0661 (web)
- OCLC no.: 44846337

Links
- Journal homepage; Online archive

The Annales Henri Poincaré (A Journal of Theoretical and Mathematical Physics) is a peer-reviewed scientific journal which collects and publishes original research papers in the field of theoretical and mathematical physics. The emphasis is on "analytical theoretical and mathematical physics" in a broad sense. The journal is named in honor of Henri Poincaré and it succeeds two former journals, Annales de l'Institut Henri Poincaré, physique théorique and Helvetica Physica Acta (ISSN 0018-0238). It is published by Birkhäuser Verlag. Its first Chief Editor was Vincent Rivasseau, followed by Krzysztof Gawedzki, and the current Chief Editor is Claude-Alain Pillet.

== Abstracting and indexing ==
According to the Journal Citation Reports, the journal had a 2020 impact factor of 1.550. The journal is published as one volume of 12 issues per year and is abstracted or indexed in the following databases: Academic OneFile, Academic Search, Current Abstracts, Current Contents/Physical, Chemical and Earth Sciences, Digital Mathematics Registry, Gale, Google Scholar, Inspec, Journal Citation Reports/Science Edition, Mathematical Reviews, OCLC, Science Citation Index, Science Citation Index Expanded (SciSearch), SCOPUS, Summon by Serial Solutions, TOC Premier, VINITI - Russian Academy of Science, Zentralblatt Math.

== See also ==
- Institut Henri Poincaré
