= George A. Elliott =

Canadian mathematician (born 1945)

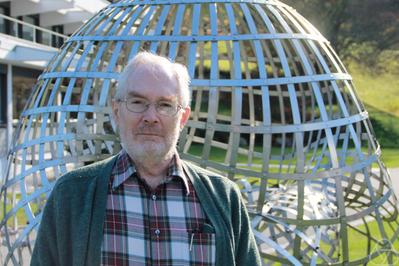
- Citizenship: Canadian
- Education: Queen's University (BSc); University of Toronto (PhD)
- Known for: Elliott classification program
- Awards: Fellow of the Royal Society of Canada 1982; CRM-Fields Prize 1996; Jeffery–Williams Prize 1998; John L. Synge Award 1999; Fellow of the American Mathematical Society, 2012
- Scientific career
- Fields: Mathematics
- Workplaces: University of Toronto; University of Copenhagen
- Thesis: Derivations Of Matroid C* Algebras (1969)
- Doctoral advisor: Israel Halperin

George Arthur Elliott FRSC (born 1945) is a Canadian mathematician specializing in operator algebras, K-theory, and non-commutative geometry. He is a Canada Research Chair at the University of Toronto. He is best known for his work on C*-algebras, both for initiating their classification and highlighting the importance of K-theory in this respect.

He was an invited speaker at the International Congress of Mathematicians in Zürich, 1994. He is married to mathematician Noriko Yui at Queen's University.

== Awards and honours ==
- 1982 Elected as Fellow of Royal Society of Canada.
- 1996 CRM/Fields Institute Prize
- 1996-1998 Killam Research Fellow.
- 1998 Jeffery–Williams Prize.
- 1999 John L. Synge Award.
- 2012 Fellow of the American Mathematical Society.
- 2019 Fellow of the Canadian Mathematical Society
