= Michael C. Reed =

American mathematician

- Born: 1942 (age 83–84)
- Education: B.S., Yale; Ph.D., Stanford University
- Employer: Duke University
- Scientific career
- Thesis: On the Self-Adjointness of Quantum Fields and Hamiltonians (1968)
- Doctoral advisor: Ralph S. Phillips
- Doctoral students: David F. Anderson; Freda Porter; Danielle Carr Ramdath; Rachel Thomas

Michael Charles Reed is an American mathematician known for his contributions to mathematical physics and mathematical biology.

Reed first attended Yale University, where he graduated with a bachelor's degree. In 1969 he earned a PhD from Stanford University. Since 1977 he has taught at Duke University, where he is the Bishop-MacDermott Professor of Mathematics.

To clarify the mathematics supporting the theories of quantum mechanics, he joined with Barry Simon to publish Methods of Modern Mathematical Physics in four volumes during the 1970s. In a review, William Faris wrote

The value of the Reed and Simon volumes is that they provide a bridge between abstract functional analysis and concrete problems of physics. There are no other books with the same scope... The Reed and Simon series is the one place where the recent discoveries of mathematical physics are consolidated. Its volumes are for anyone who has encountered the frustration and fascination of quantum mechanics and wants to begin the serious task of learning the mathematics behind it.

Subsequently, Reed has since worked predominantly in applications of analysis to biology. He has described some of the challenges of the field.

A conference in 2007 Applications of Analysis to Mathematical Biology honored Prof. Reed's sixty-fifth birthday; Prof. Simon was among the invited speakers. In 2012 he became a fellow of the American Mathematical Society.

== Methods of Modern Mathematical Physics ==
Four volumes written with Barry Simon and published by Academic Press:

- 1972: Vol. I: Functional Analysis MR 0493419
- 1975: Vol. II: Fourier Analysis, Self-Adjointness MR 0493420
- 1978: Vol. III: Scattering Theory MR 0529429
- 1977: Vol. IV: Analysis of Operators MR 0493421
