= Bolyai Prize =

International prize for mathematicians

The International János Bolyai Prize of Mathematics is an international prize founded by the Hungarian Academy of Sciences. The prize is named after János Bolyai and is awarded every five years to mathematicians for monographs with important new results in the preceding 10 years.

== Medalists ==
- 1905 – (France) Henri Poincaré
- 1910 – (Germany) David Hilbert
- 2000 – (Israel) Saharon Shelah for his Cardinal Arithmetic, Oxford University Press, 1994. ISBN 0198537859
- 2005 – (Russia) (France) Mikhail Gromov for his Metric Structures for Riemannian and Non-Riemannian Spaces, Birkhäuser, 1999. ISBN 0817638989
- 2010 – (Russia) (Germany) Yuri I. Manin for his Frobenius Manifolds, Quantum Cohomology, and Moduli Spaces, American Mathematical Society, 1999. ISBN 0821819178
- 2015 – (United States) (Israel) Barry Simon for his Orthogonal Polynomials on the Unit Circle, American Mathematical Society, 2005. ISBN 9780821834466
- 2020 – (Australia) (United States) Terence Tao for his Nonlinear Dispersive Equations: Local and Global Analysis, American Mathematical Society, 2006. ISBN 9780821841433
- 2025 – (Hungary) János Kollár for his Families of Varieties of General Type, Cambridge University Press, 2023. ISBN 9781009346115

== See also ==
- List of mathematics awards
