= Ed Perkins =

Canadian mathematician (born 1953)

- Born: Edwin Arend Perkins; 1953 (age 72–73)
- Education: University of Illinois at Urbana–Champaign
- Scientific career
- Thesis: A Nonstandard Approach to Brownian Local Time
- Doctoral advisor: Frank Bardsley Knight
- Website: www.math.ubc.ca/~perkins/perkins.html

Edwin Arend Perkins (born 1953) is a Canadian mathematician specializing in probability theory, including the analysis of Brownian motion and the applications to probability of non-standard analysis. He is a professor emeritus of mathematics and statistics at the University of British Columbia.

== Education and career ==
Perkins received a bachelor's degree in mathematics in 1975 from the University of Toronto. He obtained his PhD in 1979 under the supervision of Frank Bardsley Knight at the University of Illinois at Urbana–Champaign with a dissertation titled 'A Nonstandard Approach to Brownian Local Time'.

He came to the University of British Columbia as a postdoctoral researcher in 1979, and became an assistant professor there in 1982. He was promoted to associate professor in 1985 and full professor in 1989. He was given a tier 1 Canada Research Chair in Probability in 2001.

== Recognition ==
Perkins was elected to the Royal Society of Canada (FRSC) in 1988 and to the Royal Society (FRS) in 2007.

He was the 1983 recipient of the Rollo Davidson Prize, the 2002 recipient of the Jeffery–Williams Prize of the Canadian Mathematical Society and (with John McKay) one of two recipients of the 2003 CRM-Fields-PIMS prize.

In 2019 the University of Illinois gave him their Mathematics Alumni Award for Outstanding Professional Achievement.
