= CRM-Fields-PIMS prize =

Canadian Research Prize in Mathematics

The CRM-Fields-PIMS Prize is the premier Canadian research prize in the mathematical sciences. It is awarded in recognition of exceptional research achievement in the mathematical sciences and is given annually by three Canadian mathematics institutes: the Centre de Recherches Mathématiques (CRM), the Fields Institute, and the Pacific Institute for the Mathematical Sciences (PIMS).

The prize was established in 1994 by the CRM and the Fields Institute as the CRM-Fields Prize. The prize took its current name when PIMS became a partner in 2005.

The prize carries a monetary award of $10,000, funded jointly by the three institutes. The inaugural prize winner was H.S.M. Coxeter.

== Winners ==
Source: Centre de recherches mathématiques

- 1995 – H. S. M. Coxeter
- 1996 – George A. Elliott
- 1997 – James Arthur
- 1998 – Robert V. Moody
- 1999 – Stephen A. Cook
- 2000 – Israel Michael Sigal
- 2001 – William T. Tutte
- 2002 – John B. Friedlander
- 2003 – John McKay and Edwin Perkins
- 2004 – Donald Dawson
- 2005 – David Boyd
- 2006 – Nicole Tomczak-Jaegermann
- 2007 – Joel S. Feldman
- 2008 – Allan Borodin
- 2009 – Martin T. Barlow
- 2010 – Gordon Slade
- 2011 – Mark A. Lewis
- 2012 – Stevo Todorčević
- 2013 – Bruce Reed
- 2014 – Niky Kamran
- 2015 – Kai Behrend
- 2016 – Daniel Wise
- 2017 – Henri Darmon
- 2018 – Jeremy Quastel
- 2019 – Nassif Ghoussoub
- 2020 – Catherine Sulem
- 2021 – Andrew Granville
- 2022 – Bálint Virág
- 2023 – Christian Genest
- 2024 – Ram Murty
- 2025 - Leah Edelstein-Keshet
- 2026 - Robert McCann

== See also ==
- List of mathematics awards
