= Antti Kupiainen =

Finnish mathematician and physicist

- Born: 23 June 1954 (age 72); Varkaus, Finland
- Education: Technical University of Helsinki (undergrad); Princeton University (PhD); Harvard University (postdoc)
- Occupation: mathematical physicist
- Known for: constructive quantum field theory and statistical mechanics

Antti Kupiainen (born 23 June 1954, Varkaus, Finland) is a Finnish mathematical physicist.

== Education and career ==
Kupiainen completed his undergraduate education in 1976 at the Technical University of Helsinki and received his Ph.D. in 1979 from Princeton University under Thomas C. Spencer (and Barry Simon) with thesis Some rigorous results on the 1/n expansion. As a postdoc he spent the academic year 1979/80 at Harvard University and then did research at the University of Helsinki. He became a professor of mathematics in 1989 at Rutgers University and in 1991 at the University of Helsinki.

In 1984/85 he was the Loeb Lecturer at Harvard. He was several times a visiting scholar at the Institute for Advanced Study. He was a visiting professor at a number of institutions, including IHES, University of California, Santa Barbara, MSRI, École normale supérieure, and Institut Henri Poincaré. He was twice an invited speaker at the International Congress of Mathematicians; his ICM talks were in 1990 at Kyoto on Renormalization group and random systems and in 2010 at Hyderabad on Origins of Diffusion.

From 2012 to 2014 he was the president of the International Association of Mathematical Physics. From 1997 to 2010 he was on the editorial board of Communications in Mathematical Physics. In 2010 he received the Science Award of the city of Helsinki. He received an Advanced Grant from the European Research Council (ERC) for 2009–2014. In 2022 he received (with Gawedzki) the Dannie Heineman Prize for Mathematical Physics. In 2024, he received the Henri Poincaré Prize from the International Association of Mathematical Physics.

== Research ==
Kupiainen works on constructive quantum field theory and statistical mechanics. In the 1980s he developed, with Krzysztof Gawedzki, a renormalization group method (RG) for mathematical analysis of field theories and phase transitions for spin systems on lattices. In addition in the 1980s he and Gawedzki did research on conformal field theories, in particular the WZW (Wess-Zumino-Witten) model. Then he was involved in applications of the RG method to other problems in probability theory, the theory of partial differential equations (for example, pattern formation, blow up, and moving fronts in asymptotic solutions of nonlinear parabolic differential equations), and dynamical systems (e.g. KAM theory).

As an application of RG in probability theory, Kupiainen and Jean Bricmont showed that the random walk with asymmetric random transition probabilities in three or more spatial dimensions leads to diffusion (and therefore time-irreversible behavior). Kupiainen continued his investigations into the origins of diffusion and time-irreversibility in various model systems (such as coupled chaotic mappings and weakly coupled anharmonic oscillations).

He also did research on the turbulent flow problem in hydrodynamic models. With Gawedzki, he established "anomalous inertial range scaling of the structure functions for a model of homogeneous, isotropic advection of a passive scalar by a random vector field." (Kolmogorov's theory of homogeneous turbulence breaks down for a particular model.)

In 1996 Kupiainen and Bricmont applied high temperature methods from statistical mechanics to chaotic dynamical systems.
