= Catherine Sulem =

Canadian mathematician

Catherine Sulem FRSC (born 1955) is a mathematician and violinist at the University of Toronto.

She wrote a monograph "Nonlinear Schrodinger Equation: Self-Focusing Instability and Wave Collapse" with her brother Pierre-Louis Sulem, which appears in applied Mathematical Sciences.

== Research and Career ==
In 1983, Sulem obtained her PhD at the University of Paris-Nord under the supervision of Professor Claude Bardos. After positions at the University of Nice and École Normale Supérieure in Paris, she became a professor of Mathematics at the University of Toronto in 1990. Since then, Sulem has published widely on nonlinear partial differential equations, with a particular focus on the Nonlinear Schrodinger Equation and gravitational waves.

== Awards and honours ==
Sulem is the winner of the fourth Krieger–Nelson Prize, for "important breakthroughs in understanding of many nonlinear phenomena associated with the focusing nonlinear Schrödinger equation and the water wave problem". She is also a fellow of the American Mathematical Society. In 2015, she was elected a Fellow of the Royal Society of Canada. In 2018 the Canadian Mathematical Society listed her in their inaugural class of fellows. In 2019 she gave the AWM-SIAM Sonia Kovalevsky Lecture, entitled The Dynamics of Ocean Waves, at the 7th ICIAM in Valencia. This lecture is awarded jointly by Association of Women in Mathematics and SIAM. In 2020, Sulem was awarded the CRM-Fields-PIMS Prize, the premier Canadian research prize in the mathematical sciences. She was elected to the 2023 Class of SIAM Fellows. In 2024, Sulem was also awarded the Jeffery-Williams Prize by the Canadian Mathematical Society for her significant contributions to research in nonlinear partial differential equations and fluid dynamics.

== Selected publications ==
Books

- Sulem, Catherine; Sulem, Pierre-Louis (1999), The nonlinear Schrödinger equation: Self-focusing and wave collapse, Applied Mathematical Sciences, vol. 139, Springer-Verlag, New York, ISBN 0-387-98611-1, MR 1696311.

Research articles

- Sulem, Catherine; Sulem, Pierre-Louis; Frisch, Hélène (1983), "Tracing complex singularities with spectral methods", Journal of Computational Physics, 50 (1): 138–161, Bibcode:1983JCoPh..50..138S, doi:10.1016/0021-9991(83)90045-1, MR 0702063.
- Sulem, P.-L.; Sulem, C.; Bardos, C. (1986), "On the continuous limit for a system of classical spins", Communications in Mathematical Physics, 107 (3): 431–454, Bibcode:1986CMaPh.107..431S, doi:10.1007/bf01220998, MR 0866199, S2CID 122322088.
- Craig, W.; Sulem, C. (1993), "Numerical simulation of gravity waves", Journal of Computational Physics, 108 (1): 73–83, Bibcode:1993JCoPh.108...73C, doi:10.1006/jcph.1993.1164, MR 1239970.
- Buslaev, Vladimir S.; Sulem, Catherine (2003), "On asymptotic stability of solitary waves for nonlinear Schrödinger equations", Annales de l'Institut Henri Poincaré, 20 (3): 419–475, doi:10.1016/S0294-1449(02)00018-5, MR 1972870.
- Craig, W.; Guyenne, P.; Hammack, J.; Henderson, D.; Sulem, C. (2006), "Solitary water wave interactions", Physics of Fluids, 18 (5): 057106–057106–25, Bibcode:2006PhFl...18e7106C, doi:10.1063/1.2205916, MR 2259317.
