= Thomas Spencer (mathematical physicist) =

American mathematical physicist

Thomas C. Spencer
- Born: December 24, 1946 (age 79)
- Education: AB, University of California, Berkeley; PhD, New York University
- Employer: Institute for Advanced Study
- Title: Professor
- Spouse: Bridget Murphy
- Awards: Henri Poincaré Prize (2015); Dannie Heineman Prize for Mathematical Physics (1991)

Thomas C. Spencer (born December 24, 1946) is an American mathematical physicist, known in particular for important contributions to constructive quantum field theory, statistical mechanics, and spectral theory of random operators. He is an emeritus faculty member at the Institute for Advanced Study.

== Career ==
Spencer earned his doctorate in 1972 from New York University with a dissertation titled Perturbation of the Po2 Quantum Field Hamiltonian written under the direction of James Glimm. Since 1986, he has been a faculty member in the School of Mathematics at the Institute for Advanced Study.

== Research ==
- Together with James Glimm and Arthur Jaffe he invented the cluster expansion approach to quantum field theory that is widely used in constructive field theory.
- Together with Jürg Fröhlich and Barry Simon, he invented the approach of the infrared bound, which has now become a classical tool to derive phase transitions in various models of statistical mechanics.
- Together with Jürg Fröhlich, he devised a 'multi-scale analysis' to provide, for the first time, mathematical proofs of: the Kosterlitz–Thouless transition, the phase transition in the one-dimensional ferromagnetic Ising model with interactions $J_{x,y}\sim |x-y|^{-2}$ and Anderson localization in arbitrary dimension.
- Together with David Brydges, he proved that the scaling limit of the self-avoiding walk in dimension greater or equal than 5 is Gaussian, with variance growing linearly in time. To achieve this result, they invented the technique of the lace expansion that since then has had wide application in probability on graphs.

== Awards and honors ==
Spencer is a member of the United States National Academy of Sciences, and the recipient of the Dannie Heineman Prize for Mathematical Physics (joint with Jürg Fröhlich, "For their joint work in providing rigorous mathematical solutions to some outstanding problems in statistical mechanics and field theory.").
