= Communications in Mathematical Physics =

Peer-reviewed journal

- Discipline: Mathematical Physics
- Language: English
- Edited by: Robert Seiringer

Publication details
- History: 1965–present
- Publisher: Springer (Germany)
- Frequency: 24/year
- Impact factor: 2.4 (2022)

Standard abbreviations
- ISO 4: Commun. Math. Phys.
- MathSciNet: Comm. Math. Phys.

Indexing
- CODEN: CMPHAY
- ISSN: 0010-3616 (print); 1432-0916 (web)

Links
- Journal homepage

Communications in Mathematical Physics is a peer-reviewed academic journal published by Springer. The journal publishes papers in all fields of mathematical physics, but focuses particularly in analysis related to condensed matter physics, statistical mechanics and quantum field theory, and in operator algebras, quantum information and relativity.

== History ==
Rudolf Haag conceived this journal with Res Jost, and Haag became the Founding Chief Editor. The first issue of Communications in Mathematical Physics appeared in 1965. Haag guided the journal for the next eight years. Then Klaus Hepp succeeded him for three years, followed by James Glimm, for another three years. Arthur Jaffe began as chief editor in 1979 and served for 21 years. Michael Aizenman became the fifth chief editor in the year 2000 and served in this role until 2012. He was followed by Horng-Tzer Yau. The current editor-in-chief is Robert Seiringer.

== Archives ==
Articles from 1965 to 1997 are available in electronic form free of charge, via Project Euclid, a non-profit organization initiated by Cornell University Library. This portion of the journal is provided through the Electronic Mathematical Archiving Network Initiative (EMANI) to support the long-term electronic preservation of mathematical publications.

== See also ==
- Journal of Mathematical Physics
- List of mathematics journals
- List of physics journals
