= International Congress on Mathematical Physics =

The International Congress on Mathematical Physics (ICMP) is the largest research congress in mathematical physics. It is held every three years, on behalf of the International Association of Mathematical Physics (IAMP).

== Prizes ==
The Henri Poincaré Prize and the IAMP early career award are both delivered at the ICMP.

== List of IAMP Congresses (ICMP) ==
1972: Moscow
1974: Warsaw
1975: Kyoto
1977: Rome
1979: Lausanne
1981: Berlin
1983: Boulder
1986: Marseille
1988: Swansea
1991: Leipzig
1994: Paris
1997: Brisbane (website)
2000: London
2003: Lisbon (website)
2006: Rio de Janeiro (website)
2009: Prague (website)
2012: Aalborg (website)
2015: Santiago (website)
2018: Montreal (website)
2021: Geneva (website)
2024: Strasbourg (website)
