= Giovanni Gallavotti =

Italian mathematical physicist (born 1941)

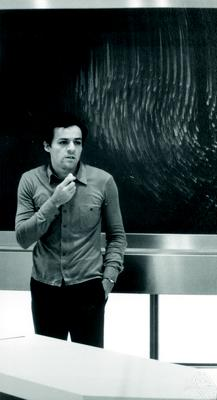
- Giovanni Gallavotti in 1975
- Born: 29 December 1941 (age 84); Naples, Italy
- Education: Sapienza University of Rome; University of Florence; Institut des Hautes Études Scientifiques
- Awards: Premio Presidente della Repubblica, Accademia Nazionale dei Lincei (1997); Boltzmann Medal (2007); Henri Poincaré Prize (2018).
- Scientific career
- Fields: Mathematical physics
- Workplaces: University of Naples Federico II; University of Florence; University of Rome Tor Vergata; Sapienza University of Rome
- Doctoral advisor: David Ruelle

Giovanni Gallavotti is an Italian mathematical physicist, born in Naples on 29 December 1941.

He is the recipient of the "Premio Nazionale Presidente della Repubblica", presso la Classe di Scienze Naturali dell'Accademia Nazionale dei Lincei, 18 June 1997, and the Boltzmann Medal awarded by IUPAP- International Union of Pure and Applied Physics), 11 July 2007, with the citation:

For his fundamental contributions to our precise understanding of equilibrium and non-equilibrium statistical physics, including the development of a constructive renormalization group for phase transitions, dynamical systems and quantum liquids.

He was an Invited Speaker with talk Renormalization theory and group in mathematical physics at the International Congress of Mathematicians (ICM) in 1986 in Berkeley and a Plenary Speaker at the ICM in 1998 in Berlin.

On 2018 he was awarded with the Henri Poincaré Prize "for his outstanding contributions to equilibrium and non-equilibrium statistical mechanics, quantum field theory, classical mechanics, and chaotic systems, including, in particular, the renormalization theory for interacting fermionic systems and the fluctuation relation for the large deviation functional of entropy production."

His father was Carlo Gallavotti.

== Selected publications ==
- Benfatto, Giuseppe; Gallavotti, Giovanni (1995-07-30). Renormalization Group. Princeton University Press. ISBN 0-691-04446-5.
- Gallavotti, Giovanni (1999-07-21). Statistical Mechanics: A Short Treatise. Springer. ISBN 978-3-540-64883-3.
- —— (2002). Foundations of Fluid Dynamics. Springer. ISBN 978-3-540-41415-5.
- ——; Bonetto, Federico; Gentile, Guido (2004-03-23). Aspects of Ergodic, Qualitative and Statistical Theory of Motion. Springer. ISBN 978-3-540-40879-6; enlarged, revised, and updated edition of Gallavotti's Aspetti della teoria ergodica, qualitativa e statistica del moto, 1980
- ——, ed. (28 November 2007). The Fermi-Pasta-Ulam Problem: A Status Report. Lecture Notes in Physics, 728. Springer. ISBN 978-3-540-72995-2.
- ——; Reiter, Wolfgang L.; Yngvason, Jakob, eds. (2008). Boltzmann's Legacy. European Mathematical Society. ISBN 978-3-03719-057-9.
- —— (2013-04-17). The Elements of Mechanics. Springer. ISBN 978-3-662-00731-0; pbk reprint of 1983 edition; originally published as Meccanica Elementare (1980)
- —— (2014-06-10). Nonequilibrium and Irreversibility. Springer. ISBN 978-3-319-06758-2.
