= Jürg Fröhlich =

Swiss mathematician and theoretical physicist

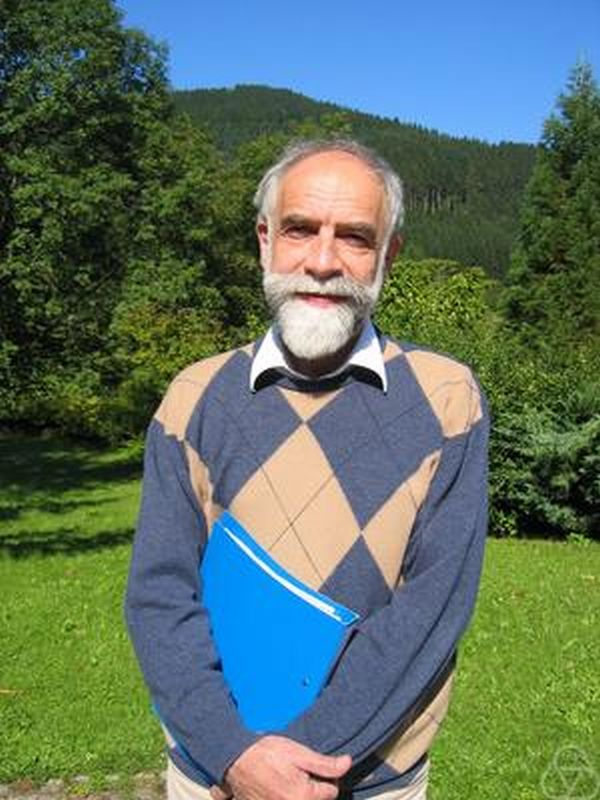
- Fröhlich at Oberwolfach, 2005
- Born: Jürg Martin Fröhlich; 4 July 1946 (age 80); Schaffhausen, Switzerland
- Education: ETH Zurich
- Awards: Dannie Heineman prize; Marcel Benoist Prize; Max Planck medal; Henri Poincaré Prize
- Scientific career
- Fields: Physics; Mathematics
- Workplaces: University of Geneva; Harvard University; Princeton University; Institut des Hautes Études Scientifiques; ETH Zurich
- Thesis: Über das Infrarot-Problem in einem Modell skalarer Elektronen und skalarer Bosonen der Ruhemasse O (1972)
- Doctoral advisor: Klaus Hepp; Walter Hunziker
- Doctoral students: Nilanjana Datta; Giovanni Felder

Jürg Martin Fröhlich (born 4 July 1946 in Schaffhausen) is a Swiss mathematician and theoretical physicist. He is best known for introducing rigorous techniques for the analysis of statistical mechanics models, in particular continuous symmetry breaking (infrared bounds), and for pioneering the study of topological phases of matter using low-energy effective field theories.

== Biography ==
In 1965 Fröhlich began to study mathematics and physics at Eidgenössischen Technischen Hochschule Zürich. In 1969, under Klaus Hepp and Robert Schrader, he attained the Diplom (“Dressing Transformations in Quantum Field Theory”), and in 1972 he earned a PhD from the same institution under Klaus Hepp. After postdoctoral visits to the University of Geneva and Harvard University (with Arthur Jaffe), he took an assistant professorship in 1974 in the mathematics department of Princeton University. From 1978 until 1982 he was a professor at Institut des Hautes Études Scientifiques in Bures-sur-Yvette in Paris, and since 1982 he has been a professor for theoretical physics at ETH, where he founded the Center for Theoretical Studies.

Over the course of his career, Fröhlich has worked on quantum field theory (including axiomatic quantum field theory, conformal field theory, and topological quantum field theory), on the precise mathematical treatment of models of statistical mechanics, on theories of phase transition, on the fractional quantum Hall effect, and on non-commutative geometry.

== Honors and awards ==
In 1991 he received with Thomas Spencer the Dannie Heineman prize, in 1997 he received the Marcel Benoist Prize, in 2001 he won the Max Planck Medal of the Deutschen Physikalischen Gesellschaft, and in 2009 he was awarded the Henri Poincaré Prize. He is a member of the Academia Europaea and the Berlin-Brandenburg Academy of Sciences and Humanities. In 2012 he became a fellow of the American Mathematical Society. In 1978, Fröhlich gave an invited address to the International Congress of Mathematicians in Helsinki (“On the mathematics of phase transitions”) and in 1994 at the plenary talk of the ICM in Zurich (“The FQHE, Chern–Simons Theory and Integral Lattices”). He also co-authored a book on quantum triviality. In 2020, he was elected international member of the National Academy of Sciences.

== Selected works ==
- Fernandez, Roberto; Jürg, Fröhlich M.; Sokal, Alan D. (1992). Random walks, critical phenomena, and triviality in quantum field theory. Springer. ISBN 0-387-54358-9.
- Fröhlich, Jürg (1978). "The Pure phases (harmonic functions) of generalized processes or: Mathematical physics of phase transitions and symmetry breaking" (PDF). Bulletin of the American Mathematical Society. 84 (2): 165–193. doi:10.1090/S0002-9904-1978-14445-0.
- "Seminario: Some recent rigorous results in the theory of phase transitions and critical phenomena". numdam.org. 1982.
- Driessler, W.; Fröhlich, Jürg (1977). "The Reconstruction of Local Observable Algebras from the Euclidean Green's Functions of a Relativistic Quantum Field Theory". Annales de l'Institut Henri Poincaré. 27: 221–236. Bibcode:1977AIHPA..27..221D.
- Eckmann, Jean-Pierre; Epstein, David; Fröhlich, Jürg (1976). "Asymptotic Perturbation Expansion for the S Matrix and the Definition of Time Ordered Functions in Relativistic Quantum Field Models". Annales de l'Institut Henri Poincaré. 25: 1–34.
- Fröhlich, Jürg M.; Studer, Urban M.; Thiran, Emmanuel (1994). "Quantum theory of large systems of nonrelativistic matter". Les Houches Lectures. arXiv:cond-mat/9508062.
- Chen, Thomas; Fröhlich, Jürg; Seifert, Maximilian (1995). "Renormalization group methods: Landau-Fermi liquid and BCS superconductor". Les Houches Lectures. arXiv:cond-mat/9508063. Bibcode:1995cond.mat..8063F.
- Fröhlich, Jürg; Grandjean, Olivier; Recknagel, Andreas (1995). "Supersymmetric quantum theory, noncommutative geometry, and gravitation". Les Houches Lectures. arXiv:hep-th/9706132.
- Fröhlich, Jürg; Simon, Barry; Spencer, Thomas (1976). "Infrared Bounds, Phase Transitions and Continuous Symmetry Breaking". Communications in Mathematical Physics. 50 (1): 79–95. Bibcode:1976CMaPh..50...79F. CiteSeerX 10.1.1.211.1865. doi:10.1007/BF01608557. S2CID 16501561.

== See also ==
- Chern–Simons theory
- Conformal field theory
- Fractional quantum Hall effect
- Local quantum physics
- Noncommutative geometry
- Quantum field theory
- Quantum triviality
- Topological quantum field theory
