= Mathematical physics =

Branch of applied mathematics

Mathematical physics is the development of mathematical methods for use in physics and their applications. A broader definition would include the development of mathematical ideas inspired by physics, known as physical mathematics.

== Scope ==
There are several distinct branches of mathematical physics, and these roughly correspond to particular historical parts of our world.

=== Classical mechanics ===
Applying the techniques of mathematical physics to classical mechanics typically involves the rigorous, abstract, and advanced reformulation of Newtonian mechanics in terms of Lagrangian mechanics and Hamiltonian mechanics (including both approaches in the presence of constraints). Both formulations are embodied in analytical mechanics and lead to an understanding of the deep interplay between the notions of symmetry and conserved quantities during the dynamical evolution of mechanical systems, as embodied within the most elementary formulation of Noether's theorem. These approaches and ideas have been extended to other areas of physics, such as statistical mechanics, continuum mechanics, classical field theory, and quantum field theory. Moreover, they have provided multiple examples and ideas in differential geometry (e.g., several notions in symplectic geometry and vector bundles).

=== Partial differential equations ===
Within mathematics proper, the theory of partial differential equation, variational calculus, Fourier analysis, potential theory, and vector analysis are perhaps most closely associated with mathematical physics. These fields were developed intensively from the second half of the 18th century (by, for example, D'Alembert, Euler, and Lagrange) until the 1930s. Physical applications of these developments include hydrodynamics, celestial mechanics, continuum mechanics, elasticity theory, acoustics, thermodynamics, electricity, magnetism, and aerodynamics.

=== Quantum theory ===
An example of mathematical physics: solutions of the Schrödinger equation for quantum harmonic oscillators (left) with their amplitudes (right).

The theory of atomic spectra (and, later, quantum mechanics) developed almost concurrently with some parts of the mathematical fields of linear algebra, the spectral theory of operators, operator algebras and, more broadly, functional analysis. Nonrelativistic quantum mechanics includes Schrödinger operators, and it has connections to atomic and molecular physics. Quantum information theory is another subspecialty.

=== Relativity and quantum relativistic theories ===
The special and general theories of relativity require a rather different type of mathematics. This was group theory, which played an important role in both quantum field theory and differential geometry. This was, however, gradually supplemented by topology and functional analysis in the mathematical description of cosmological as well as quantum field theory phenomena. In the mathematical description of these physical areas, some concepts in homological algebra and category theory are also important.

=== Statistical mechanics ===
Statistical mechanics forms a separate field, which includes the theory of phase transitions. It relies upon the Hamiltonian mechanics (or its quantum version) and it is closely related with the more mathematical ergodic theory and some parts of probability theory. There are increasing interactions between combinatorics and physics, in particular statistical physics.

== Usage ==
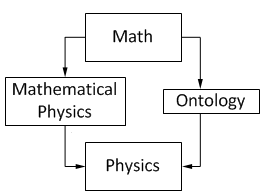
Relationship between mathematics and physics

The usage of the term "mathematical physics" is sometimes idiosyncratic. Certain parts of mathematics that initially arose from the development of physics are not, in fact, considered parts of mathematical physics, while other closely related fields are. For example, ordinary differential equations and symplectic geometry are generally viewed as purely mathematical disciplines, whereas dynamical systems and Hamiltonian mechanics belong to mathematical physics. John Herapath used the term for the title of his 1847 text on "mathematical principles of natural philosophy", the scope at that time being "the causes of heat, gaseous elasticity, gravitation, and other great phenomena of nature".

=== Mathematical vs. theoretical physics ===
The term "mathematical physics" is sometimes used to denote research aimed at studying and solving problems in physics or thought experiments within a mathematically rigorous framework. In this sense, mathematical physics covers a very broad academic realm distinguished only by the blending of some mathematical aspect and theoretical physics aspect. Although related to theoretical physics, mathematical physics in this sense emphasizes the mathematical rigour of the similar type as found in mathematics.

On the other hand, theoretical physics emphasizes the links to observations and experimental physics, which often requires theoretical physicists (and mathematical physicists in the more general sense) to use heuristic, intuitive, or approximate arguments. Such arguments are not considered rigorous by mathematicians.

Such mathematical physicists primarily expand and elucidate physical theories. Because of the required level of mathematical rigour, these researchers often deal with questions that theoretical physicists have considered to be already solved. However, they can sometimes show that the previous solution was incomplete, incorrect, or simply too naïve. Issues about attempts to infer the second law of thermodynamics from statistical mechanics are examples. Other examples concern the subtleties involved with synchronisation procedures in special and general relativity (Sagnac effect and Einstein synchronisation).

The effort to put physical theories on a mathematically rigorous footing not only developed physics but also has influenced developments of some mathematical areas. For example, the development of quantum mechanics and some aspects of functional analysis parallel each other in many ways. The mathematical study of quantum mechanics, quantum field theory, and quantum statistical mechanics has motivated results in operator algebras. The attempt to construct a rigorous mathematical formulation of quantum field theory has also brought about some progress in fields such as representation theory.

== Prominent mathematical physicists ==
=== Before Newton ===
There is a tradition of mathematical analysis of nature that goes back to the ancient Greeks; examples include Euclid (Optics), Archimedes (On the Equilibrium of Planes, On Floating Bodies), and Ptolemy (Optics, Harmonics). Later, Islamic and Byzantine scholars built on these works, and these ultimately were reintroduced or became available to the West in the 12th century and during the Renaissance.

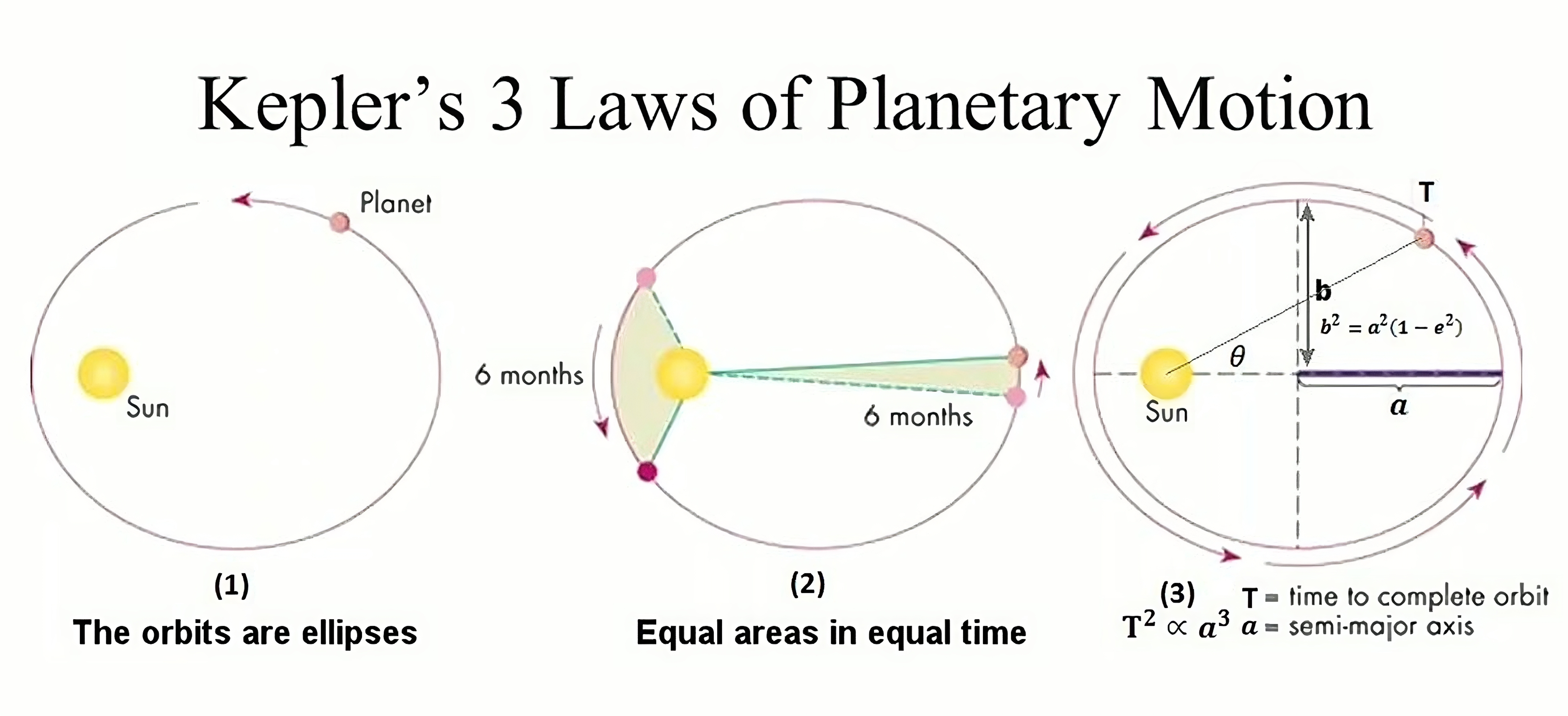
Kepler's three laws of orbital motion

In the first decade of the 16th century, amateur astronomer Nicolaus Copernicus proposed heliocentrism, and published a treatise on it in 1543. He retained the Ptolemaic idea of epicycles, and merely sought to simplify astronomy by constructing simpler sets of epicyclic orbits. Epicycles consist of circles upon circles. According to Aristotelian physics, the circle was the perfect form of motion, and was the intrinsic motion of Aristotle's fifth element—the quintessence or universal essence known in Greek as aether for the English pure air—that was the pure substance beyond the sublunary sphere, and thus was celestial entities' pure composition. The German Johannes Kepler [1571–1630], Tycho Brahe's assistant, modified Copernican orbits to ellipses, formalized in the equations of Kepler's laws of planetary motion.

An enthusiastic atomist, Galileo Galilei in his 1623 book The Assayer asserted that the "book of nature is written in mathematics". His 1632 book, about his telescopic observations, supported heliocentrism. Having made use of experimentation, Galileo then refuted geocentric cosmology by refuting Aristotelian physics itself. Galileo's 1638 book Discourse on Two New Sciences established the law of equal free fall as well as the principles of inertial motion, two central concepts of what today is known as classical mechanics. By the Galilean law of inertia as well as the principle of Galilean invariance, also called Galilean relativity, for any object experiencing inertia, there is empirical justification for knowing only that it is at relative rest or relative motion—rest or motion with respect to another object.

René Descartes developed a complete system of heliocentric cosmology anchored on the principle of vortex motion, Cartesian physics, whose widespread acceptance helped bring the demise of Aristotelian physics. Descartes used mathematical reasoning as a model for science, and developed analytic geometry, which in time allowed the plotting of locations in 3D space (Cartesian coordinates) and marking their progressions along the flow of time.

Christiaan Huygens, a talented mathematician and physicist and older contemporary of Newton, was the first to successfully idealize a physical problem by a set of mathematical parameters in Horologium Oscillatorum (1673), and the first to fully mathematize a mechanistic explanation of an unobservable physical phenomenon in Traité de la Lumière (1690). He is thus considered a forerunner of theoretical physics and one of the founders of modern mathematical physics.

=== Newtonian and post-Newtonian physics ===
The prevailing framework for science in the 16th and early 17th centuries was one borrowed from ancient Greek mathematics, where geometrical shapes formed the building blocks to describe and think about space, and time was often thought of as a separate entity. With the introduction of algebra into geometry, and with it the idea of a coordinate system, time and space could now be thought as axes belonging to the same plane. This essential mathematical framework is at the base of all modern physics and is used in further mathematical frameworks developed in subsequent centuries.

An animation for Newton's shell theorem

By the middle of the 17th century, important concepts such as the fundamental theorem of calculus (proved in 1668 by Scottish mathematician James Gregory) and finding extrema and minima of functions via differentiation using Fermat's theorem (by French mathematician Pierre de Fermat) were already known before Leibniz and Newton. Isaac Newton (1642–1727) developed calculus (although Gottfried Wilhelm Leibniz developed similar concepts outside the context of physics) and Newton's method to solve problems in mathematics and physics. He was extremely successful in his application of calculus and other methods to the study of motion. Newton's theory of motion, culminating in his Philosophiæ Naturalis Principia Mathematica (Mathematical Principles of Natural Philosophy) in 1687, modeled three Galilean laws of motion along with Newton's law of universal gravitation on a framework of absolute space—hypothesized by Newton as a physically real entity of Euclidean geometric structure extending infinitely in all directions—while presuming absolute time, supposedly justifying knowledge of absolute motion, the object's motion with respect to absolute space. The principle of Galilean invariance/relativity was merely implicit in Newton's theory of motion. Having ostensibly reduced the Kepler's laws as well as Galileo's terrestrial laws of motion to a unifying force, Newton achieved great mathematical rigor, but with theoretical laxity.

Standing waves on a string

In the 18th century, the Swiss Daniel Bernoulli (1700–1782) made contributions to fluid dynamics, and vibrating strings. The Swiss Leonhard Euler (1707–1783) did special work in variational calculus, dynamics, fluid dynamics, and other areas. Also notable was the Italian Joseph-Louis Lagrange (1736–1813), for work in analytical mechanics: he formulated Lagrangian mechanics and variational methods. A major contribution to the formulation of Analytical Dynamics called Hamiltonian dynamics was also made by the Irish physicist, astronomer and mathematician, William Rowan Hamilton (1805–1865). Hamiltonian dynamics had played an important role in the formulation of modern theories in physics, including field theory and quantum mechanics. The French mathematical physicist Joseph Fourier (1768 – 1830) introduced the notion of Fourier series to solve the heat equation, giving rise to a new approach to solving partial differential equations by means of integral transforms.

Into the early 19th century, following mathematicians in France, Germany and England had contributed to mathematical physics. The French Pierre-Simon Laplace (1749–1827) made paramount contributions to mathematical astronomy, potential theory. Siméon Denis Poisson (1781–1840) worked in analytical mechanics and potential theory. In Germany, Carl Friedrich Gauss (1777–1855) made key contributions to the theoretical foundations of electricity, magnetism, mechanics, and fluid dynamics. In England, George Green (1793–1841) published An Essay on the Application of Mathematical Analysis to the Theories of Electricity and Magnetism in 1828, which in addition to its significant contributions to mathematics made early progress towards laying down the mathematical foundations of electricity and magnetism.

A couple of decades ahead of Newton's publication of a particle theory of light, the Dutch Christiaan Huygens (1629–1695) developed the wave theory of light, published in 1690. By 1804, Thomas Young's double-slit experiment revealed an interference pattern, as though light were a wave, and thus Huygens's wave theory of light, as well as Huygens's inference that light waves were vibrations of the luminiferous aether, was accepted. Jean-Augustin Fresnel modeled hypothetical behavior of the aether. The English physicist Michael Faraday introduced the theoretical concept of a field—not action at a distance. Mid-19th century, the Scottish James Clerk Maxwell (1831–1879) reduced electricity and magnetism to Maxwell's electromagnetic field theory, whittled down by others to the four Maxwell's equations. Initially, optics was found consequent of Maxwell's field. Later, radiation and then today's known electromagnetic spectrum were found also consequent of this electromagnetic field.

An illustration of Stokes' theorem in the context of electrodynamics

The English physicist Lord Rayleigh [1842–1919] worked on sound. The Irishmen William Rowan Hamilton (1805–1865), George Gabriel Stokes (1819–1903) and Lord Kelvin (1824–1907) produced several major works: Stokes was a leader in optics and fluid dynamics; Kelvin made substantial discoveries in thermodynamics; Hamilton did notable work on analytical mechanics, discovering a new and powerful approach nowadays known as Hamiltonian mechanics. Very relevant contributions to this approach are due to his German colleague mathematician Carl Gustav Jacobi (1804–1851) in particular referring to canonical transformations. The German Hermann von Helmholtz (1821–1894) made substantial contributions in the fields of electromagnetism, waves, fluids, and sound. In the United States, the pioneering work of Josiah Willard Gibbs (1839–1903) became the basis for statistical mechanics. Fundamental theoretical results in this area were achieved by the German Ludwig Boltzmann (1844–1906). Together, these individuals laid the foundations of electromagnetic theory, fluid dynamics, and statistical mechanics.

=== Relativistic ===
By the 1880s, there was a prominent paradox that an observer within Maxwell's electromagnetic field measured it at approximately constant speed, regardless of the observer's speed relative to other objects within the electromagnetic field. Thus, although the observer's speed was continually lost relative to the electromagnetic field, it was preserved relative to other objects in the electromagnetic field. And yet no violation of Galilean invariance within physical interactions among objects was detected. As Maxwell's electromagnetic field was modeled as oscillations of the aether, physicists inferred that motion within the aether resulted in aether drift, shifting the electromagnetic field, explaining the observer's missing speed relative to it. The Galilean transformation had been the mathematical process used to translate the positions in one reference frame to predictions of positions in another reference frame, all plotted on Cartesian coordinates, but this process was replaced by Lorentz transformation, modeled by the Dutch Hendrik Lorentz. In 1908, Einstein's former mathematics professor Hermann Minkowski, applied linear algebra to model 3D space together with the 1D axis of time by treating the temporal axis like a fourth spatial dimension—altogether 4D spacetime—and declared the imminent demise of the separation of space and time.

In 1887, experimentalists Michelson and Morley failed to detect aether drift, however. It was hypothesized that motion into the aether prompted aether's shortening, too, as modeled in the Lorentz contraction. It was hypothesized that the aether thus kept Maxwell's electromagnetic field aligned with the principle of Galilean invariance across all inertial frames of reference, while Newton's theory of motion was spared.

Austrian theoretical physicist and philosopher Ernst Mach criticized Newton's postulated absolute space. Mathematician Jules-Henri Poincaré (1854–1912) questioned even absolute time. In 1905, Pierre Duhem published a devastating criticism of the foundation of Newton's theory of motion. Also in 1905, Albert Einstein published his special theory of relativity, newly explaining both the electromagnetic field's invariance and Galilean invariance by discarding all hypotheses concerning aether, including the existence of aether itself. Refuting the framework of Newton's theory—absolute space and absolute time—special relativity refers to relative space and relative time, whereby length contracts and time dilates along the travel pathway of an object.

Cartesian coordinates arbitrarily used rectilinear coordinates. Carl Friedrich Gauss, inspired by Descartes' work, introduced curved geometry, replacing rectilinear axes by curved ones. Gauss also introduced another key tool of modern physics: curvature. However, Gauss's work was limited to two dimensions; extending it to three or more dimensions introduced a great deal of complexity, and the need for the (not yet invented) tensors. It was Bernhard Riemann who extended curved geometry to N dimensions with differential geometry, now known as Riemannian geometry.

Einstein initially called this "superfluous learnedness", but later used Minkowski spacetime as tangent space in his general theory of relativity, extending invariance to all reference frames—whether perceived as inertial or as accelerated—and credited this to Minkowski, by then deceased. General relativity replaces Cartesian coordinates with Gaussian coordinates, and replaces Newton's claimed empty yet Euclidean space traversed instantly by Newton's vector of hypothetical gravitational force—an instant action at a distance—with a gravitational field. The gravitational field is Minkowski spacetime itself, the 4D topology of Einstein aether modeled on a Lorentzian manifold that "curves" geometrically, according to the Riemann curvature tensor. The concept of Newton's gravity: "two masses attract each other" replaced by the geometrical argument: "mass transform curvatures of spacetime and free falling particles with mass move along a geodesic curve in the spacetime". The innovations in geometry were foreshadowed by non-Euclidean geometry and the explorations of curvature by C. F. Gauss. Even massless energy exerts gravitational effect by its mass equivalence locally "curving" the geometry of the four, unified dimensions of space and time.

=== Quantum mechanics ===
Another revolutionary development of the 20th century was quantum theory, which emerged from the seminal contributions of Max Planck (1856–1947) (on black-body radiation) and Einstein's work on the photoelectric effect. In 1912, mathematician Henri Poincaré published Sur la théorie des quanta. He introduced the first non-naïve definition of quantization in this paper. The development of early quantum physics followed by a heuristic framework devised by Arnold Sommerfeld (1868–1951) and Niels Bohr (1885–1962), but this was soon replaced by the quantum mechanics developed by Max Born (1882–1970), Louis de Broglie (1892–1987), Werner Heisenberg (1901–1976), Paul Dirac (1902–1984), Erwin Schrödinger (1887–1961), Satyendra Nath Bose (1894–1974), and Wolfgang Pauli (1900–1958).

This revolutionary theoretical framework is based on a probabilistic interpretation of states, and evolution and measurements in terms of self-adjoint operators on an infinite-dimensional vector space. That is called Hilbert space (introduced by mathematicians David Hilbert (1862–1943), Erhard Schmidt (1876–1959) and Frigyes Riesz (1880–1956) in search of generalization of Euclidean space and study of integral equations), and rigorously defined within the axiomatic modern version by John von Neumann in his celebrated book Mathematical Foundations of Quantum Mechanics, where he built up a relevant part of modern functional analysis on Hilbert spaces, the spectral theory (introduced by David Hilbert who investigated quadratic forms with infinitely many variables. Many years later, it had been revealed that his spectral theory is associated with the spectrum of the hydrogen atom. He was surprised by this application.) in particular. Paul Dirac used algebraic constructions to produce a relativistic model for the electron, predicting its magnetic moment and the existence of its antiparticle, the positron.

=== List of prominent contributors to mathematical physics in the 20th century ===
Prominent contributors to the 20th century's mathematical physics include (ordered by birth date):

- William Thomson (Lord Kelvin) (1824–1907)
- Oliver Heaviside (1850–1925)
- Jules Henri Poincaré (1854–1912)
- David Hilbert (1862–1943)
- Arnold Sommerfeld (1868–1951)
- Constantin Carathéodory (1873–1950)
- Albert Einstein (1879–1955)
- Emmy Noether (1882–1935)
- Max Born (1882–1970)
- George David Birkhoff (1884–1944)
- Hermann Weyl (1885–1955)
- Satyendra Nath Bose (1894–1974)
- Louis de Broglie (1892–1987)
- Norbert Wiener (1894–1964)
- John Lighton Synge (1897–1995)
- Mário Schenberg (1914–1990)
- Wolfgang Pauli (1900–1958)
- Paul Dirac (1902–1984)
- Eugene Wigner (1902–1995)
- Andrey Kolmogorov (1903–1987)
- Lars Onsager (1903–1976)
- John von Neumann (1903–1957)
- Sin-Itiro Tomonaga (1906–1979)
- Hideki Yukawa (1907–1981)
- Nikolay Nikolayevich Bogolyubov (1909–1992)
- Subrahmanyan Chandrasekhar (1910–1995)
- Mark Kac (1914–1984)
- Julian Schwinger (1918–1994)
- Richard Phillips Feynman (1918–1988)
- Irving Ezra Segal (1918–1998)
- Ryogo Kubo (1920–1995)
- Arthur Strong Wightman (1922–2013)
- Chen-Ning Yang (1922–2025)
- Rudolf Haag (1922–2016)
- Freeman John Dyson (1923–2020)
- Martin Gutzwiller (1925–2014)
- Abdus Salam (1926–1996)
- Jürgen Moser (1928–1999)
- Michael Francis Atiyah (1929–2019)
- Joel Louis Lebowitz (1930–)
- Roger Penrose (1931–)
- Elliott Hershel Lieb (1932–)
- Yakir Aharonov (1932–)
- Sheldon Glashow (1932–)
- Steven Weinberg (1933–2021)
- Ludvig Dmitrievich Faddeev (1934–2017)
- David Ruelle (1935–)
- Yakov Grigorevich Sinai (1935–)
- Vladimir Igorevich Arnold (1937–2010)
- Arthur Michael Jaffe (1937–)
- Roman Wladimir Jackiw (1939–)
- Leonard Susskind (1940–)
- Rodney James Baxter (1940–)
- Michael Victor Berry (1941–)
- Giovanni Gallavotti (1941–)
- Stephen William Hawking (1942–2018)
- Jerrold Eldon Marsden (1942–2010)
- Michael C. Reed (1942–)
- John Michael Kosterlitz (1943–)
- Israel Michael Sigal (1945–)
- Alexander Markovich Polyakov (1945–)
- Barry Simon (1946–)
- Herbert Spohn (1946–)
- John Lawrence Cardy (1947–)
- Giorgio Parisi (1948-)
- Abhay Ashtekar (1949-)
- Edward Witten (1951–)
- F. Duncan Haldane (1951–)
- Ashoke Sen (1956–)
- Juan Martín Maldacena (1968–)

== See also ==
- Gauge theory (mathematics)
- International Association of Mathematical Physics
- Notable publications in mathematical physics
- List of mathematical physics journals
- Mathematical model
- Relationship between mathematics and physics
- Theoretical, computational and philosophical physics
