= Mathieu Lewin =

French mathematician (born 1977)

Mathieu Lewin (born 14 November 1977 in Senlis, Oise, France) is a French mathematician and mathematical physicist who deals with partial differential equations, mathematical quantum field theory, and mathematics of quantum mechanical many-body systems.

== Biography ==
Lewin studied mathematics at the École normale supérieure de Cachan, receiving his master's degree in 2000. He then received his PhD in 2004 at the Paris Dauphine University (Dauphine-Paris) PhD under the direction of Éric Séré. His dissertation was titled Some Nonlinear Models in quantum mechanics. From 2004 to 2005 he was a postdoctoral fellow at the University of Copenhagen under Jan Philip Solovej. From 2005, he conducted research for the Centre national de la recherche scientifique (CNRS) at the University of Cergy-Pontoise, then at the Paris-Dauphine university.

In July 2012, he was awarded an EMS Prize "for his ground breaking work in rigorous aspects of quantum chemistry, mean field approximations to relativistic quantum field theory and statistical mechanics".

== Works ==
His works concern the mathematical properties of matter at the microscopic scale, and they are mostly based on quantum mechanics. He uses tools from the calculus of variations, nonlinear functional analysis, partial differential equations, and spectral theory. For instance, he studied several nonlinear models for atoms and molecules (e.g. the Multi-configurational self-consistent field and Hartree–Fock methods), or for infinite quantum systems (e.g. in quantum field theory and condensed matter).

== Selection of papers ==
- Lewin, Mathieu (2004). "Solutions of the Multiconfiguration Equations in Quantum Chemistry". Archive for Rational Mechanics and Analysis. 171 (1). Springer: 83–114. Bibcode:2004ArRMA.171...83L. doi:10.1007/s00205-003-0281-6. S2CID 16366393.
- Hainzl, Christian; Lewin, Mathieu; Solovej, Jan Philip (2007). "The mean-field approximation in quantum electrodynamics: the no-photon case". Communications on Pure and Applied Mathematics. 60 (4). Wiley: 150402. arXiv:math-ph/0503075. doi:10.1002/cpa.20145. S2CID 14193609.
- Esteban, Maria J.; Lewin, Mathieu; Séré, Eric (2008). "Variational methods in relativistic quantum mechanics". Bulletin of the American Mathematical Society. 45 (4). American Mathematical Society (AMS): 535. arXiv:0706.3309. doi:10.1090/s0273-0979-08-01212-3.
- Lenzmann, Enno; Lewin, Mathieu (2010). "Minimizers for the Hartree-Fock-Bogoliubov theory of neutron stars and white dwarfs". Duke Mathematical Journal. 152 (2). Duke University Press: 257–315. arXiv:0809.2560. doi:10.1215/00127094-2010-013. S2CID 15321236.
- Lewin, Mathieu (2011). "Geometric methods for nonlinear many-body quantum systems". Journal of Functional Analysis. 260 (12). Elsevier: 3535–3595. arXiv:1009.2836. doi:10.1016/j.jfa.2010.11.017.
- Frank, Rupert L.; Lewin, Mathieu; Lieb, Elliott H.; Seiringer, Robert (2011). "Energy Cost to Make a Hole in the Fermi Sea". Physical Review Letters. 106 (15) 150402. American Physical Society (APS). arXiv:1102.1414. Bibcode:2011PhRvL.106o0402F. doi:10.1103/physrevlett.106.150402. PMID 21568533.
- Lewin, Mathieu; Nam, Phan Thành; Solovej, Jan Philip; Serfaty, Sylvia (2014). "Bogoliubov spectrum of interacting Bose gases". Communications on Pure and Applied Mathematics. 68 (3). Wiley: 413–471. arXiv:1211.2778. doi:10.1002/cpa.21519. S2CID 53480317.
- Lewin, Mathieu; Nam, Phan Thành; Rougerie, Nicolas (2014). "Derivation of Hartreeʼs theory for generic mean-field Bose systems". Advances in Mathematics. 254. Elsevier: 570–621. arXiv:1303.0981. doi:10.1016/j.aim.2013.12.010.
- Frank, Rupert L.; Lewin, Mathieu; Lieb, Elliott H.; Seiringer, Robert (2014). "Strichartz inequality for orthonormal functions". Journal of the European Mathematical Society. 16 (7). European Mathematical Society (EMS): 1507–1526. arXiv:1306.1309. doi:10.4171/JEMS/467.
- Lewin, Mathieu; Lieb, Elliott H.; Seiringer, Robert (2018). "Statistical mechanics of the Uniform Electron Gas". Journal de l'École Polytechnique — Mathématiques. 5. Ecole Polytechnique: 79–116. arXiv:1705.10676. doi:10.5802/jep.64.
- Lewin, Mathieu; Nam, Phan Thành; Rougerie, Nicolas (2021). "Classical field theory limit of many-body quantum Gibbs states in 2D and 3D". Inventiones Mathematicae. 224 (2). Springer: 315–444. arXiv:1810.08370. Bibcode:2021InMat.224..315L. doi:10.1007/s00222-020-01010-4. S2CID 253745623.

== Bibliography ==
- Web page
