= Jan Philip Solovej =

Danish mathematical physicist

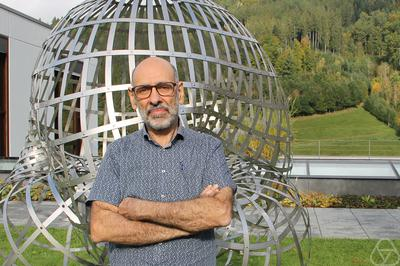
- Solovej at Oberwolfach, 2025
- Born: 14 June 1961 (age 65); Copenhagen, Denmark
- Education: University of Copenhagen (Cand. Scient. 1985); Princeton University (Ph.D. 1989)
- Awards: Henri Poincaré Prize (2021)
- Scientific career
- Fields: Mathematics, Physics
- Workplaces: University of Copenhagen
- Doctoral advisor: Elliott H. Lieb

Jan Philip Solovej (born 14 June 1961) is a Danish mathematician and mathematical physicist working on the mathematical theory of quantum mechanics. He is a professor at University of Copenhagen.

== Biography ==
Solovej obtained his Ph.D. in 1989 from Princeton University with the thesis on "Universality in the Thomas-Fermi-von Weizsäcker Model of Atoms and Molecules" supervised by Elliott H. Lieb. As a post-doctoral researcher, he went to the University of Michigan in 1989/90 and to the University of Toronto in 1990. In 1991 (and 2003/04) he was a member at the Institute for Advanced Study. From 1991 to 1995, he was Assistant Professor in the Department of Mathematics at Princeton University. From 1995 to 1997, he was a research professor at the University of Aarhus. Since 1997, he is professor in the Department of Mathematics at the University of Copenhagen. Since 2016, he is also leader of VILLUM Centre of Excellence for the Mathematics of Quantum Theory (QMATH).

He is President of European Mathematical Society during 2023-2026.

He is Editor in Chief of Journal of Mathematical Physics (since 2019).

He is married and has two children.

== Recognition ==
In 2021, he received the Henri Poincaré Prize from the International Association of Mathematical Physics, "for outstanding contributions to the analysis of quantum many-body problems ranging from the electronic structure of large atoms to the Lee-Huang-Yang asymptotics of the ground state energy of dilute Bose gases".

He was an invited speaker at the International Congress of Mathematicians in 2022, an invited speaker at the European Congress of Mathematics in 1996 and 2004, and a plenary speaker at the International Congress on Mathematical Physics in 1991, 2003 and 2021.

Solovej is a member of the Royal Danish Academy of Sciences and Letters (elected 2000) and of the Academia Europaea(elected 2020). He was named a Fellow of the American Mathematical Society, in the 2022 class of fellows, "for contributions to the rigorous analysis of quantum systems, particularly many-body systems".

== Works ==
Solovej deals with mathematical questions in atomic physics (large atoms and molecules in the Thomas-Fermi model and the Hartree-Fock method), solid-state physics (the Bose-Einstein condensate, Bogoliubov transformation, quantum dot, Heisenberg model and others) and in many-body quantum mechanics (the stability of matter, the Lieb-Thirring inequality and others). He is co-author, together with Elliott H. Lieb, Robert Seiringer, and Jakob Yngvason, of a monograph on the mathematics of the Bose gas.

In 1995, with Elliott H. Lieb and Michael Loss, he proved the stability of matter in magnetic fields.

In 2003, he established the ionization conjecture for atoms within the Hartree-Fock theory, namely the excess charge, the ionization energy and the radius of an atom are uniformly bounded independently of the nuclear charge. Related questions for many-body Schrödinger equation remain open, which are Problems 9, 10, 11 of the Simon problems on Schrödinger operators.

In 2012, with Rupert L. Frank, Christian Hainzl and Robert Seiringer, he derived the Ginzburg-Landau theory from the BCS theory.

In 2014, with Elliott H. Lieb, he proved Wehrl's conjecture on the mininimum entropy of quantum spin systems.

In 2020, with Søren Fournais, he proved the Lee-Huang-Yang conjecture on the ground state energy of dilute Bose gases.

== Selection of publications ==
- Solovej, Jan Philip (1991). "Proof of the ionization conjecture in a reduced Hartree-Fock model". Inventiones Mathematicae. 104 (1). Springer: 291–311. doi:10.1007/bf01245077. hdl:2027.42/46574.
- Lieb, Elliott H.; Loss, Michael; Solovej, Jan Philip (1995). "Stability of Matter in Magnetic Fields". Physical Review Letters. 75 (6). American Physical Society (APS): 985–989. arXiv:cond-mat/9506047. doi:10.1103/physrevlett.75.985.
- Solovej, Jan (2003). "The ionization conjecture in Hartree–Fock theory". Annals of Mathematics. 158 (2): 509–576. arXiv:math-ph/0012026. doi:10.4007/annals.2003.158.509.
- "The Mathematics of the Bose Gas and its Condensation". Oberwolfach Seminars. Vol. 34. Springer. 2005. doi:10.1007/b137508.
- Frank, Rupert L.; Hainzl, Christian; Seiringer, Robert; Solovej, Jan Philip (2012). "Microscopic derivation of Ginzburg-Landau theory". Journal of the American Mathematical Society. 25 (3). American Mathematical Society (AMS): 667–713. arXiv:1102.4001. doi:10.1090/s0894-0347-2012-00735-8.
- Lieb, Elliott H.; Solovej, Jan Philip (2014). "Proof of an entropy conjecture for Bloch coherent spin states and its generalizations". Acta Mathematica. 212 (2). International Press of Boston: 379–398. arXiv:1208.3632. doi:10.1007/s11511-014-0113-6.
- Fournais, Søren; Solovej, Jan Philip (1 November 2020). "The energy of dilute Bose gases". Annals of Mathematics. 192 (3). doi:10.4007/annals.2020.192.3.5.
- Fournais, Søren; Solovej, Jan Philip (2023). "The energy of dilute Bose gases II: the general case". Inventiones mathematicae. 232. Springer. arXiv:2108.12022. doi:10.1007/s00222-022-01175-0.
