= Strictly-correlated-electrons density functional theory =

Theoretical formalism in condensed matter physics

The strictly-correlated-electrons density functional theory (SCE DFT) approach, originally proposed by Michael Seidl in 1999, is a formulation of density functional theory (DFT), alternative to the DFT approach based on Kohn–Sham equations, especially aimed at the study of strongly correlated materials. The essential difference between the two approaches is the choice of the auxiliary system (having the same density $n(\mathbf r)$ as the real, physical one). In Kohn–Sham DFT this system is composed by non-interacting electrons, for which the kinetic energy can be calculated exactly and the interaction term has to be approximated. In SCE DFT, instead, the starting point is totally the opposite one: the auxiliary system has infinite electronic correlation and zero kinetic energy.

== Strictly-correlated-electrons reference system ==
To understand how the systems of strictly-correlated electrons (SCE) is constructed, it is useful to first think in terms of a simple example. Consider a collection of $N$ identical classical charges (with repulsive Coulomb interaction) confined in some container with a given shape. If let alone, the charges will distribute themselves within the container until they reach the spatial configuration that minimizes their interaction energy (in equilibrium, their kinetic energy is zero). Of course, the equilibrium position of the charges will depend on the shape of the container.

Suppose now that in this classical system one of the $N$ charges, which we can label as number "1", is pinned at some arbitrary position $\mathbf r_1=\mathbf r$ inside the container. Clearly, the equilibrium position of the other $N-1$ charges will now not only depend on the shape of the container, but also on the position $\mathbf r$ of the pinned charge. Thus, for a given confining geometry, one can write the position of the $i$-th particle $(i=2,..,N)$, $\mathbf r_i$, as a function of $\mathbf r$: $\mathbf r_i=\mathbf f_i(\mathbf r)$.

In the SCE system, as in the classical example described above, the position $\mathbf r_1=\mathbf r$ of a reference electron determines the position of the remaining ones. The analogue role of the confining container is now played by the condition that the density at each point must be the same as that of the real system, $n(\mathbf r)$: the electrons will always try to be as far apart from each other as possible, in order to minimize their repulsion, but always restricted by this condition. The positions $\mathbf r_i=\mathbf f_i(\mathbf r_1)$ are called co-motion functions and play a fundamental role in the SCE formalism, analogue to the Kohn–Sham single-particle orbitals in Kohn–Sham DFT.

Schematic figure showing the co-motion functions for a system of N=7 electrons in a harmonic confining potential. The reference electron is chosen as the one moving horizontally from the center of the dot to the right. The weight of each configuration (proportional to the density at the reference position) is represented by the changing size of the dots.

== Calculation of the co-motion functions and interaction energy ==
For a given density $n(\mathbf r)$, the probability of finding one electron at a certain position $\mathbf r$ is the same as that of finding the $i$-th electron at $\mathbf f_i[n](\mathbf r)$, or, equivalently, $n(\mathbf r)d\mathbf r = n(\mathbf f_i(\mathbf r))d\mathbf f_i(\mathbf r)$.

The co-motion functions can be obtained from the integration of this equation. An analytical solution exists for 1D systems, but not for the general case.

The interaction energy of the SCE system for a given density $n(\mathbf r)$ can be exactly calculated in terms of the co-motion functions as

$V_{\rm ee}^{\rm SCE}[n]= \int d\mathbf s\frac{n(\mathbf s)}{N}\sum_{i= 1}^{N-1}\sum_{j= i+1}^N\frac{1}{|\mathbf f_i(\mathbf s)-\mathbf f_j(\mathbf s)|} =\frac{1}{2}\int d\mathbf s \,n(\mathbf s)\sum_{i= 2}^N \frac{1}{|\mathbf s-\mathbf f_i(\mathbf s)|}$.

Notice that this is analogous to the Kohn–Sham approach, where the non-interacting kinetic energy is expressed in terms of the Kohn–Sham single-particle orbitals.

A very important property of the SCE system is the following one: since the position of one particle determines the position of the remaining ones, the total coulomb repulsion felt by a particle at a point $\mathbf r$ becomes a function of only $\mathbf r$ itself. This force can then be written as minus the gradient of some one-particle potential $v_{\rm SCE}(\mathbf r)$:

$-\nabla v_{\rm SCE}(\mathbf r) = F_{\rm coulomb}(\mathbf r) = \sum_{i=2}^N \frac{\mathbf r - \mathbf f_i[n](\mathbf r)}{|\mathbf r - \mathbf f_i[n](\mathbf r)|^3}$.

At the same time, it can be shown that the potential $v_{\rm SCE}(\mathbf r)$ satisfies the relation

$\frac{\delta V_{\rm ee}^{\rm SCE}[n]}{\delta n(\mathbf r)}=- v_{\rm SCE}(\mathbf r)$.

A promising route towards the application of the SCE approach to systems with general symmetry is the mass-transportation-theory reformulation of the approach. This is based on the analogies between the SCE problem and the dual Kantorovich problem. The SCE wave function is also very useful to set rigorous bounds for the constant appearing in the Lieb–Oxford inequality.

== Combining SCE and the Kohn–Sham approaches ==
The one-body potential $v_{\rm SCE}(\mathbf r)$ can be used to approximate the Hartree-exchange-correlation (Hxc) potential of the Kohn–Sham DFT approach. Indeed, one can see the analogy between the expression relating the functional derivative of $V_{\rm ee}^{\rm SCE}[n]$ and $v_{\rm SCE}(\mathbf r)$ and the well-known one of Kohn–Sham DFT

$\frac{\delta E_{\rm Hxc}[n]}{\delta n(\mathbf r)}= v_{\rm Hxc}(\mathbf r)$, which relates the Hartree-exchange-correlation (Hxc) functional and the corresponding potential.

The approximation (which becomes exact in the limit of infinitely strong interaction) corresponds to writing the Hohenberg-Kohn functional as $F[n] = T_{\rm s}[n] + E_{\rm Hxc}[n] \approx T_{\rm s}[n] + V_{\rm ee}^{\rm SCE}[n]$, where $T_{\rm s}[n]$ is the non-interacting kinetic energy.

One has therefore $v_{\rm Hxc}(\mathbf r) \approx - v_{\rm SCE}(\mathbf r)$ and this leads to the Kohn–Sham equations

$\left(-\frac{\hbar^2}{2m}\nabla^2+v_{\rm ext}(\mathbf r)-v_{\rm SCE}(\mathbf r)\right)\phi_{i}(\mathbf r)=\varepsilon_{i}\phi_{i}(\mathbf r)$, which can be solved self-consistently.

Since the $v_{\rm SCE}(\mathbf r)$ potential is constructed from the exact properties of the SCE system, it is able to capture the effects of the strongly-correlated regime, as it has been recently shown in the first applications of this "KS-SCE DFT" approach to simple model systems. In particular, the method has allowed to observe Wigner localization in strongly-correlated electronic systems without introducing any artificial symmetry breaking.

== Other related density functional methods in the strongly correlated system ==
The fractional quantum Hall effect (FQHE) is a strongly correlated system of general interest in the field of condensed matter. Previous DFT applications maps the FQHE to a reference system of non-interacting electrons, but fail to capture many interesting features of FQHE. The progress has been recently made to map the FQHE instead to a reference system of non-interacting composite fermions, which are emergent particles in FQHE. When a non-local exchange-correlation is incorporated to take care of the long-range gauge interaction between composite fermions, this DFT method successfully captures not only configurations with nonuniform densities but also topological properties such as fractional charge and fractional braid statistics for the quasiparticles excitations. This is a non-trivial example of how the DFT method can be applied to a strongly correlated FQHE system and provide numerical result comparable to those exact-diagonalization results. It opens a new line to attack the problem of FQHE through the popular DFT method.
