= Simon problems =

Fifteen open problems in mathematical physics

In mathematics, the Simon problems (or Simon's problems) are a series of fifteen questions posed in the year 2000 by Barry Simon, an American mathematical physicist. Inspired by other collections of mathematical problems and open conjectures, such as the famous list by David Hilbert, the Simon problems concern quantum operators. Eight of the problems pertain to the anomalous spectral behavior of Schrödinger operators, and five concern operators that incorporate the Coulomb potential.

In 2014, Artur Avila won a Fields Medal for work including the solution of three Simon problems. Among these was the problem of proving the set of energy levels of one particular abstract quantum system was, in fact, the Cantor set, a challenge known as the "Ten Martini Problem" after the reward Mark Kac offered for solving it.

The 2000 list was a refinement of a similar set of problems Simon had posed in 1984.

== Context ==
Background definitions for the "Coulomb energies" problems ($N$ non-relativistic particles (electrons) in $\mathbb{R}^{3}$ with spin $1/2$ and an infinitely heavy nucleus with charge $Z$ and Coulombic mutual interaction):

- $\mathcal{H}_f^{(N)}$ is the space of functions on $L^2(\mathbb{R}^{3N}; \mathbb{C}^{2N})$ which are asymmetrical under exchange of the $N$ spin and space coordinates. Equivalently, the subspace of $(L^2(\mathbb{R}^{3})\otimes \mathbb{C}^{2})^{\otimes N}$ which is asymmetrical under the exchange of the $N$ factors.
- The Hamiltonian is $H(N, Z) := \sum_{i = 1}^N(-\Delta_i - \frac{Z}{|x_i|} ) + \sum_{i < j}\frac{1}{|x_i - x_j|}$. Here $x_i \in \mathbb{R}^3$ is the coordinate of the $i$-th particle, $\Delta_i$ is the Laplacian with respect to the coordinate $x_i$. Even if the Hamiltonian does not explicitly depend on the state of the spin sector, the presence of spin has an effect due to the asymmetry condition on the total wave-function.
- We define $E(N, Z) := \min_{\mathcal{H}_f} H(N, Z)$, that is, the ground state energy of the $(N,Z)$ system.
- We define $N_0(Z)$ to be the smallest value of $N$ such that $E(N + j, Z) = E(N, Z)$ for all positive integers $j$; it is known such a number always exists and is always between $Z$ and $2Z$, inclusive.

== The 1984 list ==
Simon listed the following problems in 1984:

No.	Short name	Statement	Status	Year solved
1st	(a) Almost always global existence for Newtonian gravitating particles	(a) Prove that the set of initial conditions for which Newton's equations fail to have global solutions has measure zero.	Open as of 1984. In 1977, Donald Saari showed this is true for 4-body problems.	?
1st	(b) Existence of non-collisional singularities in the Newtonian N-body problem	Show that there are non-collisional singularities in the Newtonian N-body problem for some N and suitable masses.	In 1988, Xia gave an example of a 5-body configuration which undergoes a non-collisional singularity. In 1991, Gerver showed 3n-body problems in the plane for some sufficiently large value of n also undergo non-collisional singularities.	1989
2nd	(a) Ergodicity of gases with soft cores	Find repulsive smooth potentials for which the dynamics of N particles in a box (with, e.g., smooth wall potentials) is ergodic.	Open as of 1984. Yakov Sinai once proved the hard sphere gas is ergodic, but no complete proof has appeared except for the case of two particles, and a sketch for three, four, and five particles.	?
2nd	(b) Approach to equilibrium	Use the scenario above to justify that large systems with forces that are attractive at suitable distances approach equilibrium, or find an alternate scenario that does not rely on strict ergodicity in finite volume.	Open as of 1984.	?
2nd	(c) Asymptotic abelianness for the quantum Heisenberg dynamics	Prove or disprove that the multidimensional quantum Heisenberg model is asymptotically abelian.	Open as of 1984.	?
3rd	Turbulence and all that	Develop a comprehensive theory of long-time behavior of dynamical systems, including a theory of the onset of and of fully developed turbulence.	Open as of 1984.	?
4th	(a) Fourier's heat law	Find a mechanical model in which a system of size $L$ with temperature difference $\Delta T$ between its ends has a rate of heat temperature that goes as $L^{-1}$ in the limit $L\to\infty$.	Open as of 1984.	?
4th	(b) Kubo's formula	Justify Kubo's formula in a quantum model or find an alternate theory of conductivity.	Open as of 1984.	?
5th	(a) Exponential decay of $v = 2$ classical Heisenberg correlations	Consider the two-dimensional classical Heisenberg model. Prove that for any beta, correlations decay exponentially as distance approaches infinity.	Open as of 1984.	?
5th	(b) Pure phases and low temperatures for the $v\geq 3$ classical Heisenberg model	Prove that, in the $D = 3$ model at large beta and at dimension $v\geq 3$, the equilibrium states form a single orbit under $SO(3)$: the sphere.	Open as of 1984.	?
5th	(c) GKS for classical Heisenberg models	Let $f$ and $g$ be finite products of the form $(\sigma_{\alpha}\cdot\sigma_{\gamma})$ in the $D = 3$ model. Is it true that $<fg>_{\Lambda, \beta}\geq<f>_{\Lambda, \beta}<g>_{\Lambda, \beta}$ ?	Open as of 1984.	?
5th	(d) Phase transitions in the quantum Heisenberg model	Prove that for $v\geq 3$ and large beta, the quantum Heisenberg model has long range order.	Open as of 1984.	?
6th	Explanation of ferromagnetism	Verify the Heisenberg picture of the origin of ferromagnetism (or an alternative) in a suitable model of a realistic quantum system.	Open as of 1984.	?
7th	Existence of continuum phase transitions	Show that for suitable choices of pair potential and density, the free energy is non-$C^1$ at some beta.	Open as of 1984.	?
8th	(a) Formulation of the renormalization group	Develop mathematically precise renormalization transformations for $v$-dimensional Ising-type systems.	Open as of 1984.	?
8th	(b) Proof of universality	Show that critical exponents for Ising-type systems with nearest neighbor coupling but different bond strengths in the three directions are independent of ratios of bond strengths.	Open as of 1984.	?
9th	(a) Asymptotic completeness for short-range N-body quantum systems	Prove asymptotic completeness for N-body Schrödinger operators with short-range potentials ($\oplus~\text{Ran}~\Omega_a^+ = L^2(X)$).	Proved for generic N-body systems in 1987 by I. M. Sigal and A. Soffer; and later by Jan Derezinski and C. Gérard.	1987
9th	(b) Asymptotic completeness for Coulomb potentials	Suppose $v = 3, V_{ij}(x) = e_{ij}|x|^{-1}$. Prove that $\oplus~\text{Ran}~\Omega_a^{D, +} = L^2(X)$.	Open as of 1984.	?
10th	(a) Monotonicity of ionization energy	(a) Prove that $(\Delta E)(N - 1, Z)\geq (\Delta E)(N, Z)$.	Open as of 2026.	?
10th	(b) The Scott correction	Prove that the ground state energy of a heavy atom of atomic number Z follows the predicted asymptotic expansion, rigorously justifying the "Scott Correction" $(c_2 Z^2)$ to the Thomas-Fermi model.	Proved by H. Siedentop and R. Weikard, and later by C. Fefferman and L. Seco.	1987
10th	(c) Asymptotic ionization	Find the leading asymptotics of $(\Delta E)(Z, Z)$. Prove that the maximum number of electrons $N_{max}$ an atom can bind cannot exceed Z by more than a small amount.	Proved by Elliott H. Lieb and Michael Loss.	2003
10th	(d) Asymptotics of maximal ionized charge	Prove that $\lim_{Z\to\infty}N(Z)/Z = 1$.	Proved by Fefferman and Seco.	1997
10th	(e) Rate of collapse of Bose matter	Find suitable $C_1, C_2, \alpha$ such that $-C_1 N^{\alpha}\leq\tilde{E}_B(N, N; 1)\leq C_2 N^{\alpha}$.	Open as of 2026.	?
11th	Existence of crystals	Prove a suitable version of the existence of crystals (e.g. there is a choice of minimizing configurations that converge to some infinite lattice configuration).	Open as of 1984.	?
12th	(a) Existence of extended states in the Anderson model	Prove that in $v\geq 3$ and for small $\lambda$ that there is a region of absolutely continuous spectrum of the Anderson model, and determine whether this is false for $v = 2$.	Open as of 1984.	?
12th	(b) Diffusive bound on "transport" in random potentials	Prove that $\text{Exp}(\delta_0, (e^{itH}\vec{N}e^{-itH})^2\delta_0)\leq c(1 + |t|)$ for the Anderson model, and more general random potentials.	Open as of 1984.	?
12th	(c) Smoothness of $k(E)$ through the mobility edge in the Anderson model	Is $k(E)$, the integrated density of states, a $C^{\infty}$ function in the Anderson model at all couplings?	Open as of 1984.	?
12th	(d) Analysis of the almost Mathieu equation	Verify the following for the almost Mathieu equation: If $\alpha$ is a Liouville number and $\lambda\neq 0$, then the spectrum is purely singular continuous for almost all $\theta$.; If $\alpha$ is a Roth number and $|\lambda| < 2$, then the spectrum is purely absolutely continuous for almost all $\theta$.; If $\alpha$ is a Roth number and $|\lambda| > 2$, then the spectrum is purely dense pure point.; If $\alpha$ is a Roth number and $|\lambda| = 2$, then $\sigma(h)$ has Lebesgue measure zero and the spectrum is purely singular continuous.	Open as of 1984.	?
12th	(e) Point spectrum in a continuous almost periodic model	Show that $-\frac{d^2}{dx^2} + \lambda\cos(2\pi x) + \mu\cos(2\pi\alpha x + \theta)$ has some point spectrum for suitable $\alpha, \lambda, \mu$ and almost all $\theta$.	Open as of 1984.	?
13th	Critical exponent for self-avoiding walks	Let $D(n)$ be the mean displacement of a random self-avoiding walk of length $n$. Show that $v := \lim_{n\to\infty}n^{-1}\ln D(n)$ is $\frac{1}{2}$ for dimension at least four and is greater otherwise.	Open as of 1984.	?
14th	(a) Construct QCD	Give a precise mathematical construction of quantum chromodynamics.	Open as of 1984.	?
14th	(b) Renormalizable QFT	Construct a nontrivial quantum field theory that is renormalizable but not superrenormalizable.	Open as of 1984.	?
14th	(c) Inconsistency of QED	Prove that QED is not a consistent theory.	Open as of 1984.	?
14th	(d) Inconsistency of $\varphi_4^4$	Prove that a nontrivial $\varphi_4^4$ theory does not exist.	Open as of 1984.	?
15th	Cosmic censorship	Formulate and then prove or disprove a suitable version of cosmic censorship.	Open as of 1984.	?

In 2000, Simon claimed five of the problems he listed (namely 1B, 9A, 10B, 10C and 10D, 12D) were solved.

== The 2000 list ==
The Simon problems as listed in 2000 (with original categorizations), are:

No.	Short name	Statement	Status	Year solved
Quantum transport and anomalous spectral behavior
1st	Extended states	Prove that the Anderson model has purely absolutely continuous spectrum for $v\geq 3$ and suitable values of $b-a$ in some energy range.	?	?
2nd	Localization in 2 dimensions	Prove that the spectrum of the Anderson model for $v=2$ is dense pure point.	?	?
3rd	Quantum diffusion	Prove that, for $v\geq 3$ and values of $|b - a|$ where there is absolutely continuous spectrum, that $\sum_{n\in\mathbb{Z}^{\nu}} n^2|e^{itH}(n, 0)|^2$ grows like $ct$ as $t\to\infty$.	?	?
4th	Ten Martini problem	Prove that the spectrum of $h_{\alpha, \lambda, \theta}$ is a Cantor set (that is, nowhere dense) for all $\lambda\neq 0$ and all irrational $\alpha$.	Solved by Puig (2003).	2003
5th		Prove that the spectrum of $h_{\alpha, \lambda, \theta}$ has measure zero for $\lambda = 2$ and all irrational $\alpha$.	Solved by Avila and Krikorian (2003).	2003
6th		Prove that the spectrum of $h_{\alpha, \lambda, \theta}$ is absolutely continuous for $\lambda = 2$ and all irrational $\alpha$.	?	?
7th		Do there exist potentials $V(x)$ on $[0,\infty)$ such that $|V(x)|\leq C|x|^{\frac{1}{2}+\varepsilon}$ for some $\varepsilon$ and such that $-\frac{d^2}{dx^2} + V$ has some singular continuous spectrum?	Essentially solved by Denisov (2003) with only $L^2$ decay. Solved entirely by Kiselev (2005).	2003, 2005
8th		Suppose that $V(x)$ is a function on $\mathbb{R}^{\nu}$ such that $\int |x|^{-\nu + 1} |V(x)|^2 d^{\nu}x < \infty$, where $\nu\geq 2$. Prove that $-\Delta + V$ has absolutely continuous spectrum of infinite multiplicity on $[0,\infty)$.	?	?
Coulomb energies
9th		Prove that $N_0(Z) - Z$ is bounded for $Z\to\infty$.	?	?
10th		What are the asymptotics of $(\delta E)(Z) := E(Z, Z-1) - E(Z,Z)$ for $Z\to\infty$?	?	?
11th		Make mathematical sense of the nuclear shell model.	?	?
12th		Is there a mathematical sense in which one can justify current techniques for determining molecular configurations from first principles?	?	?
13th		Prove that, as the number of nuclei approaches infinity, the ground state of some neutral system of molecules and electrons approaches a periodic limit (i.e. that crystals exist based on quantum principles).	?	?
Other problems
14th		Prove that the integrated density of states $k(E)$ is continuous in the energy.	| k(E1 + ΔE) − k(E1) | < ε	?
15th	Lieb-Thirring conjecture	Prove the Lieb-Thirring conjecture on the constants $L_{\gamma, \nu}$ where $\nu = 1, \frac{1}{2} < \gamma < \frac{3}{2}$.	?	?

== See also ==
- Almost Mathieu operator
- Lieb–Thirring inequality
