= Trace inequality =

Concept in Hilbert spaces mathematics

In mathematics, there are many kinds of inequalities involving matrices and linear operators on Hilbert spaces. This article covers some important operator inequalities connected with traces of matrices.

== Basic definitions ==
Let $\mathbf{H}_n$ denote the space of Hermitian $n \times n$ matrices, $\mathbf{H}_n^+$ denote the set consisting of positive semi-definite $n \times n$ Hermitian matrices and $\mathbf{H}_n^{++}$ denote the set of positive definite Hermitian matrices. For operators on an infinite dimensional Hilbert space we require that they be trace class and self-adjoint, in which case similar definitions apply, but we discuss only matrices, for simplicity.

For any real-valued function $f$ on an interval $I \subseteq \Reals,$ one may define a matrix function $f(A)$ for any operator $A \in \mathbf{H}_n$ with eigenvalues $\lambda$ in $I$ by defining it on the eigenvalues and corresponding projectors $P$ as
$$f(A) \equiv \sum_j f(\lambda_j)P_j ~,$$
given the spectral decomposition $A = \sum_j \lambda_j P_j.$

=== Operator monotone ===
A function $f : I \to \Reals$ defined on an interval $I \subseteq \Reals$ is said to be operator monotone if for all $n,$ and all $A, B \in \mathbf{H}_n$ with eigenvalues in $I,$ the following holds,
$$A \geq B \implies f(A) \geq f(B),$$
where the inequality $A \geq B$ means that the operator $A - B \geq 0$ is positive semi-definite. One may check that $f(A) = A^2$ is, in fact, not operator monotone!

=== Operator convex ===
A function $f : I \to \Reals$ is said to be operator convex if for all $n$ and all $A, B \in \mathbf{H}_n$ with eigenvalues in $I,$ and $0 < \lambda < 1$, the following holds
$$f(\lambda A + (1-\lambda)B) \leq \lambda f(A) + (1 -\lambda)f(B).$$
Note that the operator $\lambda A + (1-\lambda)B$ has eigenvalues in $I,$ since $A$ and $B$ have eigenvalues in $I.$

A function $f$ is operator concave if $-f$ is operator convex; that is, the inequality above for $f$ is reversed.

=== Joint convexity ===
A function $g : I \times J \to \Reals,$ defined on intervals $I, J \subseteq \Reals$ is said to be jointly convex if for all $n$ and all $A_1, A_2 \in \mathbf{H}_n$ with eigenvalues in $I$ and all $B_1, B_2 \in \mathbf{H}_n$ with eigenvalues in $J,$ and any $0 \leq \lambda \leq 1$ the following holds
$$g(\lambda A_1 + (1-\lambda) A_2, \lambda B_1 + (1-\lambda) B_2) ~\leq~ \lambda g(A_1, B_1) + (1 -\lambda) g(A_2, B_2).$$

A function $g$ is jointly concave if −$g$ is jointly convex, i.e. the inequality above for $g$ is reversed.

=== Trace function ===
Given a function $f : \Reals \to \Reals,$ the associated trace function on $\mathbf{H}_n$ is given by
$$A \mapsto \operatorname{Tr} f(A) = \sum_j f(\lambda_j),$$
where $A$ has eigenvalues $\lambda$ and $\operatorname{Tr}$ stands for a trace of the operator.

== Convexity and monotonicity of the trace function ==
Let $f: \mathbb{R} \rarr \mathbb{R}$ be continuous, and let n be any integer. Then, if $t\mapsto f(t)$ is monotone increasing, so is $A \mapsto \operatorname{Tr} f(A)$ on H_{n}.

Likewise, if $t \mapsto f(t)$ is convex, so is $A \mapsto \operatorname{Tr} f(A)$ on H_{n}, and it is strictly convex if f is strictly convex.

See proof and discussion in, for example.

== Löwner–Heinz theorem ==
For $-1\leq p \leq 0$, the function $f(t) = -t^p$ is operator monotone and operator concave.

For $0 \leq p \leq 1$, the function $f(t) = t^p$ is operator monotone and operator concave.

For $1 \leq p \leq 2$, the function $f(t) = t^p$ is operator convex. Furthermore,

$f(t) = \log(t)$ is operator concave and operator monotone, while
$f(t) = t \log(t)$ is operator convex.

The original proof of this theorem is due to K. Löwner who gave a necessary and sufficient condition for f to be operator monotone. An elementary proof of the theorem is discussed in and a more general version of it in.

== Klein's inequality ==
For all Hermitian n×n matrices A and B and all differentiable convex functions $f: \mathbb{R} \rarr \mathbb{R}$ with derivative f ' , or for all positive-definite Hermitian n×n matrices A and B, and all differentiable convex functions f:(0,∞) → $\mathbb{R}$, the following inequality holds,

$\operatorname{Tr}[f(A)- f(B)- (A - B)f'(B)] \geq 0~.$

In either case, if f is strictly convex, equality holds if and only if A = B. A popular choice in applications is f(t) = t log t, see below.

=== Proof ===
Let $C=A-B$ so that, for $t\in (0,1)$,

$$B + tC = (1 -t)B + tA$$,

varies from $B$ to $A$.

Define

$$F(t) = \operatorname{Tr}[f(B + tC)]$$.

By convexity and monotonicity of trace functions, $F(t)$ is convex, and so for all $t\in (0,1)$,

$$F(0) + t(F(1)-F(0))\geq F(t)$$,

which is,

$$F(1) - F(0) \geq \frac{F(t)-F(0)}{t}$$,

and, in fact, the right hand side is monotone decreasing in $t$.

Taking the limit $t\to 0$ yields,

$$F(1) - F(0) \geq  F'(0)$$,

which with rearrangement and substitution is Klein's inequality:

$$\mathrm{tr}[f(A)-f(B)-(A-B)f'(B)] \geq 0$$

Note that if $f(t)$ is strictly convex and $C\neq 0$, then $F(t)$ is strictly convex. The final assertion follows from this and the fact that $\tfrac{F(t) -F(0)}{t}$ is monotone decreasing in $t$.

== Golden–Thompson inequality ==
In 1965, S. Golden and C.J. Thompson independently discovered that

For any matrices $A, B\in\mathbf{H}_n$,

$$\operatorname{Tr} e^{A+B}\leq \operatorname{Tr} e^A e^B.$$

This inequality can be generalized for three operators: for non-negative operators $A, B, C\in\mathbf{H}_n^+$,

$$\operatorname{Tr} e^{\ln A -\ln B+\ln C}\leq \int_0^\infty \operatorname{Tr} A(B+t)^{-1}C(B+t)^{-1}\,\operatorname{d}t.$$

== Peierls–Bogoliubov inequality ==
Let $R, F\in \mathbf{H}_n$ be such that Tr e^{R} = 1. Defining g = Tr Fe^{R}, we have

$$\operatorname{Tr} e^F e^R \geq \operatorname{Tr} e^{F+R}\geq e^g.$$

The proof of this inequality follows from the above combined with Klein's inequality. Take f(x) = exp(x), A=R + F, and B = R + gI.

== Gibbs variational principle ==
Let $H$ be a self-adjoint operator such that $e^{-H}$ is trace class. Then for any $\gamma\geq 0$ with $\operatorname{Tr}\gamma=1,$

$$\operatorname{Tr}\gamma H+\operatorname{Tr}\gamma\ln\gamma\geq -\ln \operatorname{Tr} e^{-H},$$

with equality if and only if $\gamma=\exp(-H)/\operatorname{Tr} \exp(-H).$

== Lieb's concavity theorem ==
The following theorem was proved by E. H. Lieb in. It proves and generalizes a conjecture of E. P. Wigner, M. M. Yanase, and Freeman Dyson. Six years later other proofs were given by T. Ando and B. Simon, and several more have been given since then.

For all $m\times n$ matrices $K$, and all $q$ and $r$ such that $0 \leq q\leq 1$ and $0\leq r \leq 1$, with $q + r \leq 1$ the real valued map on $\mathbf{H}^+_m \times \mathbf{H}^+_n$ given by

$$F(A,B,K) = \operatorname{Tr}(K^*A^qKB^r)$$

- is jointly concave in $(A,B)$
- is convex in $K$.

Here $K^*$ stands for the adjoint operator of $K.$

== Lieb's theorem ==
For a fixed Hermitian matrix $L\in\mathbf{H}_n$, the function

$$f(A)=\operatorname{Tr} \exp\{L+\ln A\}$$

is concave on $\mathbf{H}_n^{++}$.

The theorem and proof are due to E. H. Lieb, Thm 6, where he obtains this theorem as a corollary of Lieb's concavity Theorem. The most direct proof is due to H. Epstein; see M.B. Ruskai papers, for a review of this argument.

== Ando's convexity theorem ==
T. Ando's proof of Lieb's concavity theorem led to the following significant complement to it:

For all $m \times n$ matrices $K$, and all $1 \leq q \leq 2$ and $0 \leq r \leq 1$ with $q-r \geq 1$, the real valued map on $\mathbf{H}^{++}_m \times \mathbf{H}^{++}_n$ given by

$$(A,B) \mapsto \operatorname{Tr}(K^*A^qKB^{-r})$$

is convex.

== Joint convexity of relative entropy ==
For two operators $A, B\in\mathbf{H}^{++}_n$ define the following map

$$R(A\parallel B):= \operatorname{Tr}(A\log A) - \operatorname{Tr}(A\log B).$$

For density matrices $\rho$ and $\sigma$, the map $R(\rho\parallel\sigma)=S(\rho\parallel\sigma)$ is the Umegaki's quantum relative entropy.

Note that the non-negativity of $R(A\parallel B)$ follows from Klein's inequality with $f(t)=t\log t$.

=== Statement ===
The map $R(A\parallel B): \mathbf{H}^{++}_n \times \mathbf{H}^{++}_n \rightarrow \mathbf{R}$ is jointly convex.

=== Proof ===
For all $0 < p < 1$, $(A,B) \mapsto \operatorname{Tr}(B^{1-p}A^p)$ is jointly concave, by Lieb's concavity theorem, and thus

$$(A,B)\mapsto \frac{1}{p-1}(\operatorname{Tr}(B^{1-p}A^p)-\operatorname{Tr}A)$$

is convex. But

$$\lim_{p\rightarrow 1}\frac{1}{p-1}(\operatorname{Tr}(B^{1-p}A^p)-\operatorname{Tr}A)=R(A\parallel B),$$

and convexity is preserved in the limit.

The proof is due to G. Lindblad.

== Jensen's operator and trace inequalities ==
The operator version of Jensen's inequality is due to C. Davis.

A continuous, real function $f$ on an interval $I$ satisfies Jensen's Operator Inequality if the following holds

$$f\left(\sum_kA_k^*X_kA_k\right)\leq\sum_k A_k^*f(X_k)A_k,$$

for operators $\{A_k\}_k$ with $\sum_k A^*_kA_k=1$ and for self-adjoint operators $\{X_k\}_k$ with spectrum on $I$.

See, for the proof of the following two theorems.

=== Jensen's trace inequality ===
Let f be a continuous function defined on an interval I and let m and n be natural numbers. If f is convex, we then have the inequality

$$\operatorname{Tr}\Bigl(f\Bigl(\sum_{k=1}^nA_k^*X_kA_k\Bigr)\Bigr)\leq \operatorname{Tr}\Bigl(\sum_{k=1}^n A_k^*f(X_k)A_k\Bigr),$$

for all (X_{1}, ... , X_{n}) self-adjoint m × m matrices with spectra contained in I and all (A_{1}, ... , A_{n}) of m × m matrices with

$$\sum_{k=1}^nA_k^*A_k=1.$$

Conversely, if the above inequality is satisfied for some n and m, where n > 1, then f is convex.

=== Jensen's operator inequality ===
For a continuous function $f$ defined on an interval $I$ the following conditions are equivalent:

- $f$ is operator convex.
- For each natural number $n$ we have the inequality

$$f\Bigl(\sum_{k=1}^nA_k^*X_kA_k\Bigr)\leq\sum_{k=1}^n A_k^*f(X_k)A_k,$$

for all $(X_1, \ldots , X_n)$ bounded, self-adjoint operators on an arbitrary Hilbert space $\mathcal{H}$ with spectra contained in $I$ and all $(A_1, \ldots , A_n)$ on $\mathcal{H}$ with $\sum_{k=1}^n A^*_kA_k=1.$

- $f(V^*XV) \leq V^*f(X)V$ for each isometry $V$ on an infinite-dimensional Hilbert space $\mathcal{H}$ and

every self-adjoint operator $X$ with spectrum in $I$.

- $Pf(PXP + \lambda(1 -P))P \leq Pf(X)P$ for each projection $P$ on an infinite-dimensional Hilbert space $\mathcal{H}$, every self-adjoint operator $X$ with spectrum in $I$ and every $\lambda$ in $I$.

== Araki–Lieb–Thirring inequality ==
E. H. Lieb and W. E. Thirring proved the following inequality in 1976: For any $A \geq 0,$ $B \geq 0$ and $r \geq 1,$
$$\operatorname{Tr} ((BAB)^r) ~\leq~ \operatorname{Tr} (B^r A^r B^r).$$

In 1990 H. Araki generalized the above inequality to the following one: For any $A \geq 0,$ $B \geq 0$ and $q \geq 0,$
$$\operatorname{Tr}((BAB)^{rq}) ~\leq~ \operatorname{Tr}((B^r A^r B^r)^q),$$
for $r \geq 1,$ and
$$\operatorname{Tr}((B^r A^r B^r)^q) ~\leq~ \operatorname{Tr}((BAB)^{rq}),$$
for $0 \leq r \leq 1.$

There are several other inequalities close to the Lieb–Thirring inequality, such as the following: for any $A \geq 0,$ $B \geq 0$ and $\alpha \in [0, 1],$
$$\operatorname{Tr} (B A^\alpha B B A^{1-\alpha} B) ~\leq~ \operatorname{Tr} (B^2 A B^2),$$
and even more generally: for any $A \geq 0,$ $B \geq 0,$ $r \geq 1/2$ and $c \geq 0,$
$$\operatorname{Tr}((B A B^{2c} A B)^r) ~\leq~ \operatorname{Tr}((B^{c+1} A^2 B^{c+1})^r).$$
The above inequality generalizes the previous one, as can be seen by exchanging $A$ by $B^2$ and $B$ by $A^{(1-\alpha)/2}$ with $\alpha = 2 c / (2 c + 2)$ and using the cyclicity of the trace, leading to
$$\operatorname{Tr}((B A^\alpha B B A^{1-\alpha} B)^r) ~\leq~ \operatorname{Tr}((B^2 A B^2)^r).$$

Additionally, building upon the Lieb–Thirring inequality the following inequality was derived: For any $A,B\in \mathbf{H}_n, T\in \mathbb{C}^{n\times n}$ and all $1\leq p,q\leq \infty$ with $1/p+1/q = 1$, it holds that
$$|\operatorname{Tr}(TAT^*B)| ~\leq~ \operatorname{Tr}(T^*T|A|^p)^\frac{1}{p}\operatorname{Tr}(TT^*|B|^q)^\frac{1}{q}.$$

== Effros's theorem and its extension ==
E. Effros in proved the following theorem.

If $f(x)$ is an operator convex function, and $L$ and $R$ are commuting bounded linear operators, i.e. the commutator $[L,R]=LR-RL=0$, the perspective

$$g(L, R):=f(LR^{-1})R$$

is jointly convex, i.e. if $L=\lambda L_1+(1-\lambda)L_2$ and $R=\lambda R_1+(1-\lambda)R_2$ with $[L_i, R_i]=0$ (i=1,2), $0\leq\lambda\leq 1$,

$$g(L,R)\leq \lambda g(L_1,R_1)+(1-\lambda)g(L_2,R_2).$$

Ebadian et al. later extended the inequality to the case where $L$ and $R$ do not commute .

== Von Neumann's trace inequality and related results ==
Von Neumann's trace inequality, named after its originator John von Neumann, states that for any $n \times n$ complex matrices $A$ and $B$ with singular values $\alpha_1 \geq \alpha_2 \geq \cdots \geq \alpha_n$ and $\beta_1 \geq \beta_2 \geq \cdots \geq \beta_n$ respectively,
$$|\operatorname{Tr}(A B)| ~\leq~ \sum_{i=1}^n \alpha_i \beta_i\,,$$
with equality if and only if $A$ and $B^{\dagger}$ share singular vectors.

A simple corollary to this is the following result: For Hermitian $n \times n$ positive semi-definite complex matrices $A$ and $B$ where now the eigenvalues are sorted decreasingly ($a_1 \geq a_2 \geq \cdots \geq a_n$ and $b_1 \geq b_2 \geq \cdots \geq b_n,$ respectively),
$$\sum_{i=1}^n a_i b_{n-i+1} ~\leq~ \operatorname{Tr}(A B) ~\leq~ \sum_{i=1}^n a_i b_i\,.$$

== See also ==
- Lieb–Thirring inequality – Inequality in mathematical physics
- Schur–Horn theorem – Characterizes the diagonal of a Hermitian matrix with given eigenvalues
- Trace identity – Equations involving the trace of a matrix
- von Neumann entropy – Type of entropy in quantum theory
