= Raphaël Krikorian =

French mathematician

Raphaël Krikorian (born 22 April 1968 in Reims) is a French mathematician, currently a professor at the CY Cergy Paris University. He is known for his contributions to dynamical systems.

After studying at the École polytechnique, Krikorian earned his PhD under supervision of Michael Herman in 1996.

He published his scientific work in such journals as Annals of Mathematics, Duke Mathematical Journal and Inventiones Mathematicae. With Artur Avila he solved the fifth Simon problem on zero measure in the Anderson model equation.

Krikorian is a member of the editorial boards of Journal of Dynamics and Differential Equations and Journal of Modern Dynamics.

He was an invited speaker at International Congress of Mathematicians (which has been called "the equivalent ... of an induction to a hall of fame") in Rio de Janeiro in 2018, and at the conference Dynamics, Equations and Applications in Kraków in 2019.
