= Scheffé's lemma =

Result in measure theory

In mathematics, Scheffé's lemma is a proposition in measure theory concerning the $L^1$ convergence of sequences of integrable functions. It states that, if $f_n$ is a sequence of integrable functions on a measure space $(X,\Sigma,\mu)$ that converges almost everywhere to another integrable function $f$, then

$\int_X |f_n - f| \, d\mu \to 0$

if and only if

$\int _X| f_n | \, d\mu \to \int_X | f | \, d\mu$.

The proof is based fundamentally on an application of the triangle inequality and Fatou's lemma.

== Applications ==
Applied to probability theory, Scheffe's theorem, in the form stated here, implies that almost everywhere pointwise convergence of the probability density functions of a sequence of $\mu$-absolutely continuous random variables implies convergence in distribution of those random variables.

== Generalization ==
The Brezis–Lieb lemma is a quantitative version of Scheffé's lemma. It states that

$\int_X |f_n|-|f_n - f|d\mu\to \int_X |f| d\mu.$

== History ==
Henry Scheffé published a proof of the statement on convergence of probability densities in 1947. The result is a special case of a theorem by Frigyes Riesz about convergence in L^{p} spaces published in 1928.
