= Brezis–Lieb lemma =

Result in measure theory

In the mathematical field of analysis, the Brezis–Lieb lemma is a basic result in measure theory. It is named for Haïm Brézis and Elliott Lieb, who discovered it in 1983. The lemma can be viewed as an improvement, in certain settings, of Fatou's lemma to an equality. As such, it has been useful for the study of many variational problems. It is a refined version of Scheffé's lemma.

== The lemma and its proof ==
=== Statement of the lemma ===
Let (X, μ) be a measure space and let f_{n} be a sequence of measurable complex-valued functions on X which converge almost everywhere to a function f. The limiting function f is automatically measurable. The Brezis–Lieb lemma asserts that if p is a positive number, then

$$\lim_{n\to\infty}\int_X\Big||f|^p-|f_n|^p+|f-f_n|^p\Big|\,d\mu=0,$$

provided that the sequence f_{n} is uniformly bounded in L^{p}(X, μ). A significant consequence, which sharpens Fatou's lemma as applied to the sequence |f_{n}|^{p}, is that

$$\int_X|f|^p\,d\mu=\lim_{n\to\infty}\left(\int_X|f_n|^p\,d\mu-\int_X|f-f_n|^p\,d\mu\right),$$

which follows by the triangle inequality. This consequence is often taken as the statement of the lemma, although it does not have a more direct proof.

=== Proof ===
The essence of the proof is in the inequalities

$$\begin{align}
W_n\equiv \Big||f_n|^p-|f|^p-|f-f_n|^p\Big|&\leq\Big||f_n|^p-|f-f_n|^p\Big|+|f|^p\\
&\leq\varepsilon|f-f_n|^p+C_\varepsilon|f|^p.
\end{align}$$

The consequence is that W_{n} − ε|f − f_{n}|^{p}, which converges almost everywhere to zero, is bounded above by an integrable function, independently of n. The observation that

$$W_n\leq\max\Big(0,W_n-\varepsilon|f-f_n|^p\Big)+\varepsilon|f-f_n|^p,$$

and the application of the dominated convergence theorem to the first term on the right-hand side shows that

$$\limsup_{n\to\infty}\int_XW_n\,d\mu\leq\varepsilon\sup_n\int_X |f-f_n|^p\,d\mu.$$

The finiteness of the supremum on the right-hand side, with the arbitrariness of ε, shows that the left-hand side must be zero.
