= Lieb–Oxford inequality =

In quantum chemistry and physics, the Lieb–Oxford inequality provides a lower bound for the indirect part of the Coulomb energy of a quantum mechanical system. It is named after Elliott H. Lieb and Stephen Oxford.

The inequality is of importance for density functional theory and plays a role in the proof of stability of matter.

== Introduction ==
In classical physics, one can calculate the Coulomb energy of a configuration of charged particles in the following way. First, calculate the charge density ρ, where ρ is a function of the coordinates $x\in\R^3$. Second, calculate the Coulomb energy by integrating:

$$\frac{1}{2}\int_{\mathbb{R}^3}\int_{\mathbb{R}^3}\frac{\rho(x)\rho(y)}{|x-y|} \, \mathrm{d}^3 x \, \mathrm{d}^3 y.$$

In other words, for each pair of points x and y, this expression calculates the energy related to the fact that the charge at x is attracted to or repelled from the charge at y. The factor of 1/2 corrects for double-counting the pairs of points.

In quantum mechanics, it is also possible to calculate a charge density ρ, which is a function of $x\in\R^3$. More specifically, ρ is defined as the expectation value of charge density at each point. But in this case, the above formula for Coulomb energy is not correct, due to exchange and correlation effects. The above, classical formula for Coulomb energy is then called the "direct" part of Coulomb energy. To get the actual Coulomb energy, it is necessary to add a correction term, called the "indirect" part of Coulomb energy. The Lieb–Oxford inequality concerns this indirect part. It is relevant in density functional theory, where the expectation value ρ plays a central role.

== Statement of the inequality ==
For a quantum mechanical system of N particles, each with charge e, the N-particle density is denoted by

$$P(x_1,\dots,x_N).$$

The function P is only assumed to be non-negative and normalized. Thus the following applies to particles with any "statistics". For example, if the system is described by a normalised square integrable N-particle wave function

$$\psi\in L^2(\mathbb{R}^{3N}),$$

then

$$P(x_1,\dots,x_N)=|\psi(x_1,\dots,x_N)|^2.$$

More generally, in the case of particles with spin having q spin states per particle and with corresponding wave function

$$\psi(x_1,\sigma_1,\dots,x_N,\sigma_N)$$

the N-particle density is given by

$$P(x_1,\dots,x_N)=\sum_{\sigma_1=1}^q\cdots\sum_{\sigma_N=1}^q|\psi(x_1,\sigma_1,\dots,x_N,\sigma_N)|^2.$$

Alternatively, if the system is described by a density matrix γ, then P is the diagonal

$$\gamma(x_1, ... , x_N;  x_1, ..., x_N ).$$

The electrostatic energy of the system is defined as

$$I_P=e^2\sum_{1\le i<j\le N}\int_{\mathbb{R}^{3N}}\frac{P(x_1,\dots,x_i,\dots,x_j,\dots,x_N)}{|x_i-x_j|} \, \mathrm{d}^3 x_1\cdots\mathrm{d}^3 x_N.$$

For $x\in\R^3$, the single particle charge density is given by

$$\rho(x)=|e|\sum_{i=1}^N\int_{\mathbb{R}^{3(N-1)}}P(x_1,\dots,x_{i-1},x,x_{i+1},\dots,x_N) \, \mathrm{d}^3 x_1\cdots\mathrm{d}^3 x_{i-1} \, \mathrm{d}^3 x_{i+1}\cdots\mathrm{d}^3 x_N$$

and the direct part of the Coulomb energy of the system of N particles is defined as the electrostatic energy associated with the charge density ρ, i.e.

$$D(\rho)=\frac12\int_{\mathbb{R}^3} \int_{\mathbb{R}^3} \frac{\rho(x)\rho(y)}{|x-y|} \, \mathrm{d}^3 x \, \mathrm{d}^3 y.$$

The Lieb–Oxford inequality states that the difference between the true energy I_{P} and its semiclassical approximation D(ρ) is bounded from below as

$E_P=I_P-D(\rho)\ge -C|e|^\frac23\int_{\mathbb{R}^3}|\rho(x)|^\frac43 \, \mathrm{d}^3 x,$	1

where C ≤ 1.58 is a constant independent of the particle number N. E_{P} is referred to as the indirect part of the Coulomb energy and in density functional theory more commonly as the exchange plus correlation energy. A similar bound exists if the particles have different charges e_{1}, ... , e_{N}. No upper bound is possible for E_{P}.

== Optimal constant ==
While the original proof yielded the constant C = 8.52, Lieb and Oxford managed to refine this result to C = 1.68. Later, the same method of proof was used to further improve the constant to C = 1.64. It is only recently that the constant was decreased to C = 1.58. With these constants the inequality holds for any particle number N.

The constant can be further improved if the particle number N is restricted. In the case of a single particle N = 1 the Coulomb energy vanishes, I_{P} = 0, and the smallest possible constant can be computed explicitly as C_{1} = 1.092. The corresponding variational equation for the optimal ρ is the Lane–Emden equation of order 3. For two particles (N = 2) it is known that the smallest possible constant satisfies C_{2} ≥ 1.234. In general it can be proved that the optimal constants C_{N} increase with the number of particles, i.e. C_{N} ≤ C_{N + 1}, and converge in the limit of large N to the best constant C_{LO} in the inequality (1). Any lower bound on the optimal constant for fixed particle number N is also a lower bound on the optimal constant C_{LO}. The best numerical lower bound was obtained for N = 60 where C_{60} ≥ 1.41. This bound has been obtained by considering an exponential density. For the same particle number a uniform density gives C_{60} ≥ 1.34.

The largest proved lower bound on the best constant is C_{LO} ≥ 1.4442, which was first proven by Cotar and Petrache. The same lower bound was later obtained in using a uniform electron gas, melted in the neighborhood of its surface, by Lewin, Lieb & Seiringer. Hence, to summarise, the best known bounds for C are 1.44 ≤ C ≤ 1.58.

== Dirac constant ==
Historically, the first approximation of the indirect part E_{P} of the Coulomb energy in terms of the single particle charge density was given by Paul Dirac in 1930 for fermions. The wave function under consideration is

$$\psi(x_1,\sigma_1,\dots,x_N,\sigma_N)= \frac{\det(\varphi_i(x_j,\sigma_j))}{\sqrt{N!}}.$$

With the aim of evoking perturbation theory, one considers the eigenfunctions of the Laplacian in a large cubic box of volume |Λ| and sets

$$\varphi_{\alpha,k}(x,\sigma) = \frac{\chi_\alpha(\sigma)\mathrm{e}^{2\pi\mathrm{i} k\cdot x}}{\sqrt{|\Lambda|}},$$

where χ_{1}, ..., χ_{q} forms an orthonormal basis of $\C^q$. The allowed values of $k\in\R^3$ are n/|Λ|^{1/3} with $n\in\Z_+^3$. For large N, |Λ|, and fixed ρ = N |e|/|Λ|, the indirect part of the Coulomb energy can be computed to be

$$E_P(\mathrm{Dirac})=-C |e|^{2/3} q^{-1/3}\rho^{4/3}|\Lambda|,$$

with C = 0.93.

This result can be compared to the lower bound (1). In contrast to Dirac's approximation the Lieb–Oxford inequality does not include the number q of spin states on the right-hand side. The dependence on q in Dirac's formula is a consequence of his specific choice of wave functions and not a general feature.

== Generalisations ==
The constant C in (1) can be made smaller at the price of adding another term to the right-hand side. By including a term that involves the gradient of a power of the single particle charge density ρ, the constant C can be improved to 1.45. Thus, for a uniform density system C ≤ 1.45.
