= Trace identity =

Equations involving the trace of a matrix

In mathematics, a trace identity is any equation involving the trace of a matrix.

== Properties ==
Trace identities are invariant under simultaneous conjugation.

== Uses ==
They are frequently used in the invariant theory of $n \times n$ matrices to find the generators and relations of the ring of invariants, and therefore are useful in answering questions similar to that posed by Hilbert's fourteenth problem.

== Examples ==
- The Cayley–Hamilton theorem says that every square matrix satisfies its own characteristic polynomial. This also implies that all square matrices satisfy
  $$\operatorname{tr}\left(A^n\right) - c_{n-1} \operatorname{tr}\left(A^{n - 1}\right) + \cdots + (-1)^n n \det(A) = 0\,$$
  where the coefficients $c_i$ are given by the elementary symmetric polynomials of the eigenvalues of A.
- All square matrices satisfy
  $$\operatorname{tr}(A) = \operatorname{tr}\left(A^\mathsf{T}\right).\,$$

== See also ==
- Trace inequality – Concept in Hlibert spaces mathematics
