= Birman–Schwinger principle =

Eigenvalue transformation method

In mathematics the Birman–Schwinger principle is a useful technique to reduce the eigenvalue problem for an unbounded differential operator (such as a Schrödinger operator) to an eigenvalue problem for a bounded integral operator. It originates from independent work by M. Sh. Birman and J. Schwinger in 1961.

The Birman–Schwinger principle has found numerous applications in deriving bounds on the discrete eigenvalues of differential operators. One of its most prominent uses is in the original proof of the Lieb–Thirring inequality.

== Statement of the principle for self-adjoint Schrödinger operators ==
The technique was developed for self-adjoint Schrödinger operators $-\Delta - V$ on $\mathbb{R}^n$ with real-valued potentials $V:\mathbb{R}^n \to [0,\infty)$. If $\lambda < 0$ is a negative eigenvalue of the Schrödinger operator with corresponding eigenfunction $\psi \in L^2(\mathbb{R}^n)$, then the eigenequation

$-\Delta \psi - V \psi = \lambda \psi$

can be formally rearranged to

$\sqrt{V}(-\Delta - \lambda)^{-1} \sqrt{V} \, \phi = \phi$

with $\phi = \sqrt{V} \psi$. This equation shows that $\phi$ is an eigenfunction with eigenvalue 1 of the Birman–Schwinger operator

$K_\lambda = \sqrt{V}(-\Delta - \lambda)^{-1} \sqrt{V}.$

The Birman–Schwinger principle rigorously formalises this idea, establishing that $\lambda < 0$ is an eigenvalue of the Schrödinger operator if and only if 1 is an eigenvalue of $K_\lambda$ of the same multiplicity. Additionally, the principle asserts that the number $N_\lambda$ of eigenvalues of the Schrödinger operator less than or equal to $\lambda < 0$ coincides with the number of eigenvalues of $K_\lambda$ greater than or equal to 1, i.e.,

$N_\lambda = \# \{ \text{eigenvalues of } K_\lambda \text{ greater than or equal to } 1 \}.$

The statement requires regularity assumptions on the potential $V$ which ensure that $K_\lambda$ is bounded and compact.

The usefulness of this spectral equivalence lies in the fact that the integral kernel of $K_\lambda$ is well known. By the Birman–Schwinger principle, upper bounds on $N_\lambda$ can be obtained by considering Schatten norms of $K_\lambda$.

== The Birman–Schwinger bound ==
The integral kernel of $K_\lambda$ takes the form

$K_\lambda(x,y) = \sqrt{V(x)} G_\lambda(x - y) \sqrt{V(y)}$

where $G_\lambda(x - y)$ is the integral kernel of the free resolvent $(-\Delta - \lambda)^{-1}$. In dimension $n = 3$, it is explicitly given by

$K_\lambda(x,y) = \sqrt{V(x)} \frac{e^{-\sqrt{-\lambda} |x - y|}}{4\pi |x - y|} \sqrt{V(y)}.$

Computing the Hilbert–Schmidt norm of $K_\lambda$, Birman and Schwinger independently proved the bound

$N_0 \leq \frac{1}{(4\pi)^2} \int_{\mathbb{R}^3} \int_{\mathbb{R}^3} \frac{V(x)V(y)}{|x - y|} \, dx \, dy.$

By the Hardy–Littlewood–Sobolev inequality, the term on the right is further bounded by

$\frac{1}{4(4\pi)^{2/3}} \left( \int_{\mathbb{R}^3} V(x)^{3/2} \, dx \right)^{4/3}.$

In contrast, Weyl asymptotics for large coupling involve only the term $\int_{\mathbb{R}^3} V(x)^{3/2} \, dx$, without the power $4/3$. An upper bound of this form on $N_0$ can also be derived using the Birman–Schwinger principle. The result corresponds to an endpoint case of the Lieb–Thirring inequality, commonly referred to as the Cwikel–Lieb–Rozenblum bound.

== Extensions of the principle ==
In some applications, it is advantageous to define the Birman–Schwinger operator as

$K_\lambda = (-\Delta - \lambda)^{-1/2} V (-\Delta - \lambda)^{-1/2}$

instead. In particular, in one dimension $n = 1$, this approach allows for distributional potentials.

While originally established for self-adjoint Schrödinger operators, it is possible to extend the principle to the non self-adjoint case. For $\lambda \in \mathbb{C} \setminus [0,\infty)$, the Birman–Schwinger operator can then be defined as

$K_\lambda = \operatorname{sgn}(V) \sqrt{|V|}(-\Delta - \lambda)^{-1} \sqrt{|V|}.$

Again, $\lambda$ is an eigenvalue of the Schrödinger operator $-\Delta - V$ if and only if 1 is an eigenvalue of $K_\lambda$. Other factorisations of the potential $V$ can be considered as well.

More generally, the principle can be established for operators of the form $A - B$. In both the self-adjoint and non self-adjoint cases, the Birman–Schwinger principle connects eigenvalues $\lambda$ of $A - B$ to the eigenvalue 1 of $B_1 (A - \lambda)^{-1} B_2^*$ for a suitable factorisation $B = B_2^* B_1$.
