= Brascamp–Lieb inequality =

Geometric inequality or concentration inequality in mathematics and probability theory

In mathematics, the Brascamp–Lieb inequality is either of two inequalities. The first is a result in geometry concerning integrable functions on n-dimensional Euclidean space $\mathbb{R}^{n}$. It generalizes the Loomis–Whitney inequality and Hölder's inequality. The second is a result of probability theory which gives a concentration inequality for log-concave probability distributions. Both are named after Herm Jan Brascamp and Elliott H. Lieb.

== The geometric inequality ==
Fix natural numbers m and n. For 1 ≤ i ≤ m, let n_{i} ∈ N and let c_{i} > 0 so that

$$\sum_{i = 1}^m c_i n_i = n.$$

Choose non-negative, integrable functions

$$f_i \in L^1 \left( \mathbb{R}^{n_i} ; [0, + \infty] \right)$$

and surjective linear maps

$$B_i : \mathbb{R}^n \to \mathbb{R}^{n_i}.$$

Then the following inequality holds:

$$\int_{\mathbb{R}^n} \prod_{i = 1}^m f_i \left( B_i x \right)^{c_i} \, \mathrm{d} x \leq D^{- 1/2} \prod_{i = 1}^m \left( \int_{\mathbb{R}^{n_i}} f_i (y) \, \mathrm{d} y \right)^{c_i},$$

where D is given by

$$D = \inf \left\{ \left. \frac{\det \left( \sum_{i = 1}^m c_i B_i^{*} A_i B_i \right)}{\prod_{i = 1}^m ( \det A_i )^{c_i}} \right| A_i \text{ is a positive-definite } n_i \times n_i \text{ matrix} \right\}.$$

Another way to state this is that the constant D is what one would obtain by restricting attention to the case in which each $f_{i}$ is a centered Gaussian function, namely $f_{i}(y) = \exp \{-(y,\, A_{i}\, y)\}$.

== Alternative forms ==
Consider a probability density function $p(x)=\exp(-\phi(x))$. This probability density function $p(x)$ is said to be a log-concave measure if the $\phi(x)$ function is convex. Such probability density functions have tails which decay exponentially fast, so most of the probability mass resides in a small region around the mode of $p(x)$. The Brascamp–Lieb inequality gives another characterization of the compactness of $p(x)$ by bounding the mean of any statistic $S(x)$.

Formally, let $S(x)$ be any differentiable, scalar-valued function. The Brascamp–Lieb inequality reads:

$$\operatorname{var}_p (S(x)) \leq E_p ((\nabla S(x))^T [H \phi(x)]^{-1} \nabla S(x))$$

where H is the Hessian and $\nabla$ is the nabla symbol.

== BCCT inequality ==
The inequality is generalized in 2008 to account for both continuous and discrete cases, and for all linear maps, with precise estimates on the constant.

Definition: the Brascamp-Lieb datum (BL datum)

- $d, n\geq 1$.
- $d_1, ..., d_n \in \{1, 2, ..., d\}$.
- $p_1, ..., p_n \in [0, \infty)$.
- $B_i: \R^d \to \R^{d_i}$ are linear surjections, with zero common kernel: $\cap_i ker(B_i) = \{0\}$.
- Call $(B, p) = (B_1, ..., B_n, p_1, ..., p_n)$ a Brascamp-Lieb datum (BL datum).

For any $f_i \in L^1(R^{d_i})$ with $f_i \geq 0$, define
$$BL(B, p, f) := \frac{\int_H \prod_{j=1}^m\left(f_j \circ B_j\right)^{p_j}}{\prod_{j=1}^m\left(\int_{H_j} f_j\right)^{p_j}}$$

Now define the Brascamp-Lieb constant for the BL datum:
$$BL(B, p) = \max_{f }BL(B, p, f)$$

Theorem—(BCCT, 2007)

$BL(B, p)$ is finite iff $d = \sum_i p_i d_i$, and for all subspace $V$ of $\R^d$,

$$dim(V) \leq\sum_i p_i dim(B_i(V))$$

$BL(B, p)$ is reached by gaussians:

- If $BL(B, p)$ is finite, then there exists some linear operators $A_i : \R^{d_i} \to \R^{d_i}$ such that $f_i = e^{-\langle A_i x, x\rangle}$ achieves the upper bound.
- If $BL(B, p)$ is infinite, then there exists a sequence of gaussians for which

$$\frac{\int_H \prod_{j=1}^m\left(f_j \circ B_j\right)^{p_j}}{\prod_{j=1}^m\left(\int_{H_j} f_j\right)^{p_j}} \to \infty$$

=== Discrete case ===
Setup:

- Finitely generated abelian groups $G, G_1, ..., G_n$.
- Group homomorphisms $\phi_j : G \to G_j$.
- BL datum defined as $(G, G_1, ..., G_n, \phi_1, ... \phi_n)$
- $T(G)$ is the torsion subgroup, that is, the subgroup of finite-order elements.

With this setup, we have (Theorem 2.4, Theorem 3.12)

Theorem—If there exists some $s_1, ..., s_n \in [0, 1]$ such that

$$rank(H) \leq \sum_j s_j rank(\phi_j(H))
\quad \forall H \leq G$$

Then for all $0 \geq f_j \in \ell^{1/s_j}(G_j)$,

$$\left\|\prod_j f_j \circ \phi_j\right\|_1 \leq |T(G)| \prod_j \|f_j \|_{1/s_j}$$
and in particular,

$$|E| \leq |T(G)| \prod_j |\phi_j(E)|^{s_j}
\quad \forall E \subset G$$

Note that the constant $|T(G)|$ is not always tight.

=== BL polytope ===
Given BL datum $(B, p)$, the conditions for $BL(B, p) < \infty$ are

- $d = \sum_i p_i d_i$, and
- for all subspace $V$ of $\R^d$,
  $$dim(V) \leq\sum_i p_i dim(B_i(V))$$

Thus, the subset of $p\in [0, \infty)^n$ that satisfies the above two conditions is a closed convex polytope defined by linear inequalities. This is the BL polytope.

Note that while there are infinitely many possible choices of subspace $V$ of $\R^d$, there are only finitely many possible equations of $dim(V) \leq\sum_i p_i dim(B_i(V))$, so the subset is a closed convex polytope.

Similarly we can define the BL polytope for the discrete case.

== Relationships to other inequalities ==
=== The geometric Brascamp–Lieb inequality ===
The case of the Brascamp–Lieb inequality in which all the n_{i} are equal to 1 was proved earlier than the general case. In 1989, Keith Ball introduced a "geometric form" of this inequality. Suppose that $(u_i)_{i = 1}^m$ are unit vectors in $\mathbb{R}^n$ and $(c_i)_{i = 1}^m$ are positive numbers satisfying

$$\sum_{i = 1}^{m} c_i \langle x , u_i \rangle u_i = x$$

for all $x \in \mathbb{R}^n$, and that $(f_i)_{i = 1}^m$ are positive measurable functions on $\mathbb{R}$. Then

$$\int_{\mathbb{R}^n} \prod_{i = 1}^{m} f_i(\langle x,u_i \rangle)^{c_i} \, \mathrm{d} x \leq \prod_{i = 1}^{m} \left( \int_{\mathbb{R}} f_i(t) \, \mathrm{d} t \right)^{c_i}.$$

Thus, when the vectors $(u_i)$ resolve the inner product the inequality has a particularly simple form: the constant is equal to 1 and the extremal Gaussian densities are identical. Ball used this inequality to estimate volume ratios and isoperimetric quotients for convex sets in and.

There is also a geometric version of the more general inequality in which the maps $B_i$ are orthogonal projections and

$$\sum_{i = 1}^{m} c_i B_i = I$$

where $I$ is the identity operator on $\mathbb{R}^n$.

=== Hölder's inequality ===
Take n_{i} = n, B_{i} = id, the identity map on $\mathbb{R}^{n}$, replacing f_{i} by f^{1/c_{i}}_{i}, and let c_{i} = 1 / p_{i} for 1 ≤ i ≤ m. Then

$$\sum_{i = 1}^m \frac{1}{p_i} = 1$$

and the log-concavity of the determinant of a positive definite matrix implies that D = 1. This yields Hölder's inequality in $\mathbb{R}^{n}$:

$$\int_{\mathbb{R}^n} \prod_{i = 1}^m f_{i} (x) \, \mathrm{d} x \leq \prod_{i = 1}^{m} \| f_i \|_{p_i}.$$

=== Poincaré inequality ===
The Brascamp–Lieb inequality is an extension of the Poincaré inequality which only concerns Gaussian probability distributions.

=== Cramér–Rao bound ===
The Brascamp–Lieb inequality is also related to the Cramér–Rao bound. While Brascamp–Lieb is an upper-bound, the Cramér–Rao bound lower-bounds the variance of $\operatorname{var}_p (S(x))$. The Cramér–Rao bound states

$$\operatorname{var}_p (S(x)) \geq E_p (\nabla^T S(x) ) [ E_p( H \phi(x) )]^{-1} E_p( \nabla S(x) )\!$$.

which is very similar to the Brascamp–Lieb inequality in the alternative form shown above.
