= Journal of Mathematical Physics =

Peer-reviewed journal published monthly by the American Institute of Physics

- Discipline: Mathematical physics
- Language: English
- Edited by: Jan Philip Solovej

Publication details
- History: 1960–present
- Publisher: American Institute of Physics (United States)
- Frequency: Monthly
- Impact factor: 1.4 (2024)

Standard abbreviations
- ISO 4: J. Math. Phys.

Indexing
- CODEN: JMAPAQ
- ISSN: 0022-2488 (print); 1089-7658 (web)
- LCCN: a61003320
- OCLC no.: 42684012

Links
- Journal homepage

The Journal of Mathematical Physics is a peer-reviewed journal published monthly by the American Institute of Physics devoted to the publication of papers in mathematical physics. The journal was first published bimonthly beginning in January 1960; it became a monthly publication in 1963. The current editor is Jan Philip Solovej from University of Copenhagen. Its 2024 impact factor is 1.4.

== Abstracting and indexing ==
This journal is indexed by the following services:

- Biological Abstracts
- Chemical Abstracts Service
- Computer & Control Abstracts
- Current Contents / Physical, Chemical & Earth Sciences
- Current Physics Index
- Electrical & Electronics Abstracts
- Electronics and Communications Abstracts
- Energy Research Abstracts
- International Aerospace Abstracts
- ISMEC Bulletin
- Mathematical Reviews
- Nuclear Science Abstracts
- Physics Abstracts
- Pollution Abstracts
- Safety Science Abstracts
- Science Citation Index
- SPIN
