= Elliott H. Lieb =

American mathematical physicist

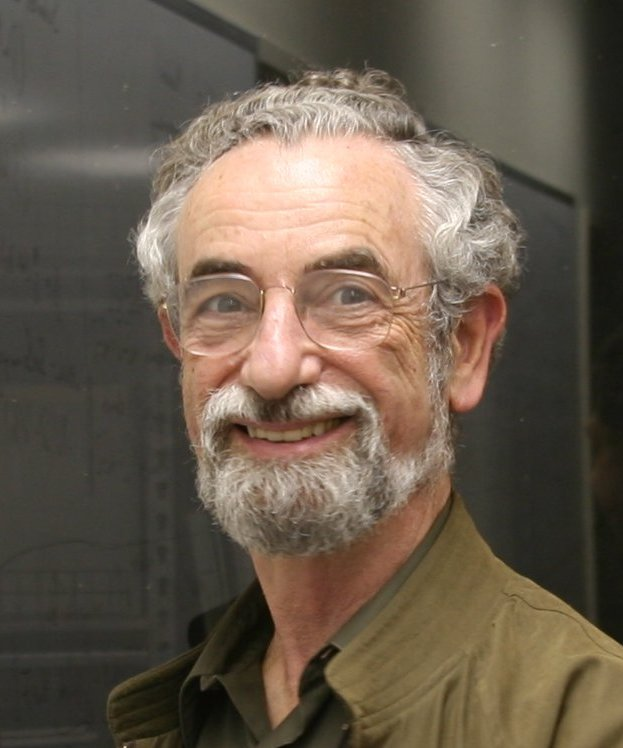
- Born: July 31, 1932 (age 94); Boston, Massachusetts, U.S.
- Education: Massachusetts Institute of Technology (BS); University of Birmingham (PhD)
- Known for: Lieb conjecture Lieb lattice Lieb's concavity theorem Lieb's square ice constant Lieb's theorem Lieb–Liniger model Lieb–Oxford inequality Lieb–Robinson bounds Lieb–Thirring inequality Lieb–Yngvason entropy principle Affleck-Kennedy-Lieb-Tasaki model Borell–Brascamp–Lieb inequality Brascamp–Lieb inequality Brezis–Lieb lemma Carlen–Lieb extension Temperley–Lieb algebra Dicke model Stability of matter Strong subadditivity of quantum entropy
- Awards: Heineman Prize for Mathematical Physics (1978); Max Planck medal Birkhoff Prize (1988); Boltzmann medal (1998); Rolf Schock Prizes in Mathematics (2001); Levi L. Conant Prize (2002); Henri Poincaré Prize (2003); Medal of the Erwin Schrödinger Institute (2021); APS Medal for Exceptional Achievement in Research (2022); Carl Friedrich Gauss Prize (2022); Dirac Medal (2022); Kyoto Prize in Basic Sciences (2023)
- Scientific career
- Fields: Mathematics, Physics
- Workplaces: Princeton University
- Doctoral advisor: Samuel Frederick Edwards; Gerald Edward Brown
- Doctoral students: Rafael Benguria; Jennifer Tour Chayes; Robert McCann; Jan Philip Solovej; Horng-Tzer Yau

Elliott Hershel Lieb (born July 31, 1932) is an American mathematical physicist. He is a professor of mathematics and physics at Princeton University. Lieb's works pertain to the quantum and classical many-body problems, atomic structure, the stability of matter, functional inequalities, the theory of magnetism, and the Hubbard model.

== Biography ==
Lieb was born in Boston in 1932. His family moved to New York when he was five. His father, from Lithuania, was an accountant, while his mother, from Bessarabia, worked as a secretary.

Lieb received his B.S. in physics from the Massachusetts Institute of Technology in 1953 and his PhD in mathematical physics from the University of Birmingham in England in 1956. Lieb was a Fulbright Fellow at Kyoto University, Japan (1956–1957), and worked as the Staff Theoretical Physicist for IBM from 1960 to 1963. In 1961–1962, Lieb was on leave as professor of applied mathematics at Fourah Bay College, the University of Sierra Leone. In 1963, he joined the Yeshiva University as an associate professor. He has been a professor at Princeton since 1975, following a leave from his professorship at MIT.

Lieb is married to fellow Princeton professor Christiane Fellbaum.

For years, Lieb has rejected the standard practice of transferring copyright of his research articles to academic publishers. Instead, he would only give publishers his consent to publish.

== Awards ==
Lieb has been awarded several prizes in mathematics and physics, including the Heineman Prize for Mathematical Physics of the American Physical Society and the American Institute of Physics (1978), the Max Planck Medal of the German Physical Society (1992), the Boltzmann medal of the International Union of Pure and Applied Physics (1998), the Schock Prize (2001), the Henri Poincaré Prize of the International Association of Mathematical Physics (2003), and the Medal of the Erwin Schrödinger Institute for Mathematics and Physics (2021).

In 2022 Lieb was awarded the Medal for Exceptional Achievement in Research from the American Physical Society for ″major contributions to theoretical physics through obtaining exact solutions to important physical problems, which have impacted condensed matter physics, quantum information, statistical mechanics, and atomic physics″ and the Carl Friedrich Gauss Prize at the International Congress of Mathematicians ″for deep mathematical contributions of exceptional breadth which have shaped the fields of quantum mechanics, statistical mechanics, computational chemistry, and quantum information theory.″ Also in 2022 he received the Dirac Medal of the ICTP jointly with Joel Lebowitz and David Ruelle.

Lieb is a member of the U.S. National Academy of Sciences and has twice served (1982–1984 and 1997–1999) as the president of the International Association of Mathematical Physics. Lieb was awarded the Austrian Decoration for Science and Art in 2002. In 2012 he became a fellow of the American Mathematical Society and in 2013 a Foreign Member of the Royal Society.

In 2023 Lieb received Kyoto Prize in Basic Sciences for his achievements in many-body physics.

== Works ==
Lieb has made fundamental contributions to both theoretical physics and mathematics. Only some of them are outlined here. His main research papers are gathered in four Selecta volumes. More details can also be found in two books published by EMS Press in 2022 on the occasion of his 90th birthday. His research is reviewed there in more than 50 chapters.

=== Statistical mechanics, soluble systems ===
Lieb is famous for many groundbreaking results in statistical mechanics concerning, in particular, soluble systems. His numerous works have been collected in the Selecta ″Statistical mechanics″ and ″Condensed matter physics and exactly soluble models″, as well as in a book with Daniel Mattis. They treat (among other things) Ising-type models, models for ferromagnetism and ferroelectricity, the exact solution of the six-vertex model of ice in two dimensions, the one-dimensional delta Bose gas (now called the Lieb-Liniger model) and the Hubbard model.

Together with Daniel Mattis and Theodore Schultz, Lieb solved in 1964 the two-dimensional Ising model (with a new derivation of the exact solution by Lars Onsager via the Jordan-Wigner transformation of the transfer matrices) and in 1961 the XY model, an explicitly solvable one-dimensional spin-1/2 model. In 1968, together with Fa-Yueh Wu, he gave the exact solution of the one-dimensional Hubbard model.

In 1971 Lieb and Neville Temperley introduced the Temperley-Lieb algebra in order to build certain transfer matrices. This algebra also has links with knot theory and the braid group, quantum groups and subfactors of von Neumann algebras.

Together with Derek W. Robinson in 1972, Lieb derived bounds on the propagation speed of information in non-relativistic spin systems with local interactions. They have become known as Lieb-Robinson bounds and play an important role, for instance, in error bounds in the thermodynamic limit or in quantum computing. They can be used to prove the exponential decay of correlations in spin systems or to make assertions about the gap above the ground state in higher-dimensional spin systems (generalized Lieb-Schultz-Mattis theorems).

In 1972 Lieb and Mary Beth Ruskai proved the strong subadditivity of quantum entropy, a theorem that is fundamental for quantum information theory. This is closely related to what is known as the data processing inequality in quantum information theory. The Lieb-Ruskai proof of strong subadditivity is based on an earlier paper where Lieb solved several important conjectures about operator inequalities, including the Wigner-Yanase-Dyson conjecture.

In the years 1997–99, Lieb provided a rigorous treatment of the increase of entropy in the second law of thermodynamics and adiabatic accessibility with Jakob Yngvason.

=== Many-body quantum systems and the stability of matter ===
In 1975, Lieb and Walter Thirring found a proof of the stability of matter that was shorter and more conceptual than that of Freeman Dyson and Andrew Lenard in 1967. Their argument is based on a new inequality in spectral theory, which became known as the Lieb-Thirring inequality. The latter has become a standard tool in the study of large fermionic systems, e.g. for (pseudo-)relativistic fermions in interaction with classical or quantized electromagnetic fields. On the mathematical side, the Lieb-Thirring inequality has also generated a huge interest in the spectral theory of Schrödinger operators. This fruitful research program has led to many important results that can be read in his Selecta ″The stability of matter : from atoms to stars″ as well as in his book ″The stability of matter in quantum mechanics″ with Robert Seiringer.

Based on the original Dyson-Lenard theorem of stability of matter, Lieb together with Joel Lebowitz had already provided in 1973 the first proof of the existence of thermodynamic functions for quantum matter. With Heide Narnhofer he did the same for Jellium, also called the homogeneous electron gas, which is at the basis of most functionals in density functional theory.

In the 1970s, Lieb together with Barry Simon studied several nonlinear approximations of the many-body Schrödinger equation, in particular Hartree-Fock theory and the Thomas-Fermi model of atoms. They provided the first rigorous proof that the latter furnishes the leading order of the energy for large non-relativistic atoms. With Rafael Benguria and Haïm Brezis, he studied several variations of the Thomas-Fermi model.

The ionization problem in mathematical physics asks for a rigorous upper bound on the number of electrons that an atom with a given nuclear charge can bind. Experimental and numerical evidence seems to suggest that there can be at most one, or possibly two extra electrons. To prove this rigorously is an open problem. A similar question can be asked concerning molecules. Lieb proved a famous upper bound on the number of electrons a nucleus can bind. Moreover, together with Israel Michael Sigal, Barry Simon and Walter Thirring, he proved, for the first time, that the excess charge is asymptotically small compared to the nuclear charge.

Together with Jakob Yngvason, Lieb gave a rigorous proof of a formula for the ground state energy of dilute Bose gases. Subsequently, together with Robert Seiringer and Jakob Yngvason he studied the Gross-Pitaevskii equation for the ground state energy of dilute bosons in a trap, starting with many-body quantum mechanics. Lieb's works with Joseph Conlon and Horng-Tzer Yau and with Jan Philip Solovej on what is known as the $N^{7/5}$ law for bosons provide the first rigorous justification of Bogoliubov's pairing theory.

In quantum chemistry Lieb is famous for having provided in 1983 the first rigorous formulation of Density Functional Theory using tools of convex analysis. The universal Lieb functional gives the lowest energy of a Coulomb system with a given density profile, for mixed states. In 1980, he proved with Stephen Oxford the Lieb-Oxford inequality which provides an estimate on the lowest possible classical Coulomb energy at fixed density and was later used for calibration of some functionals such as PBE and SCAN. More recently, together with Mathieu Lewin and Robert Seiringer he gave the first rigorous justification of the Local-density approximation for slowly varying densities.

=== Analysis ===
In the 70s Lieb entered the mathematical fields of calculus of variations and partial differential equations, where he made fundamental contributions. An important theme was the quest of best constants in several inequalities of functional analysis, which he then used to rigorously study nonlinear quantum systems. His results in this direction are collected in the Selecta ″Inequalities″. Among the inequalities where he determined the sharp constants are Young's inequality and the Hardy-Littlewood-Sobolev inequality, to be further discussed below. He also developed tools now considered standard in analysis, such as rearrangement inequalities or the Brezis-Lieb lemma which provides the missing term in Fatou's lemma for sequences of functions converging almost everywhere.

With Herm Brascamp and Joaquin Luttinger, Lieb proved in 1974 a generalization of the Riesz rearrangement inequality, stating that certain multilinear integrals increase when all the functions are replaced by their symmetric decreasing rearrangement. With Frederick Almgren, he clarified the continuity properties of rearrangement. Rearrangement is often used to prove the existence of solutions for some nonlinear models.

In two papers (one in 1976 with Herm Brascamp and another one alone in 1990), Lieb determined the validity and the best constants of a whole family of inequalities that generalizes, for instance, the Hölder's inequality, Young's inequality for convolutions, and the Loomis-Whitney inequality. This is now known as the Brascamp-Lieb inequality. The spirit is that the best constant is determined by the case where all functions are Gaussians. The Brascamp-Lieb inequality has found applications and extensions, for instance, in harmonic analysis.

Using rearrangement inequalities and compactness methods, Lieb proved in 1983 the existence of optimizers for the Hardy-Littlewood-Sobolev inequality and of the Sobolev inequality. He also determined the best constant in some cases, discovering and exploiting the conformal invariance of the problem and relating it, via stereographic projection, to a conformally equivalent, but more tractable problem on the sphere. A new rearrangement-free proof was provided later with Rupert Frank, allowing to treat the case of the Heisenberg group.

In a 1977 work, Lieb also proved the uniqueness (up to symmetries) of the ground state for the Choquard-Pekar equation, also called Schrödinger–Newton equation, which can describe a self gravitating object or an electron moving in a polarizable medium (polaron). With Lawrence Thomas he provided in 1997 a variational derivation of the Choquard-Pekar equation from a model in quantum field theory (the Fröhlich Hamiltonian). This had been solved earlier by Monroe Donsker and Srinivasa Varadhan using a probabilistic path integral method.

In another work with Herm Brascamp in 1976, Lieb extended the Prékopa-Leindler inequality to other types of convex combinations of two positive functions. He strengthened the inequality and the Brunn-Minkowski inequality by introducing the notion of essential addition.

Lieb also wrote influential papers on harmonic maps, among others with Frederick Almgren, Haïm Brezis and Jean-Michel Coron. In particular, Algrem and Lieb proved a bound on the number of singularities of energy minimizing harmonic maps.

== Selected publications ==
Books

- Lieb, Elliott H.; Seiringer, Robert. The stability of matter in quantum mechanics. Cambridge University Press, 2010 ISBN 978-0-521-19118-0
- Lieb, Elliott H.; Loss, Michael. Analysis. Graduate Studies in Mathematics, 14. American Mathematical Society, Providence, RI, 1997. xviii+278 pp. ISBN 0-8218-0632-7
- Lieb, Elliott H.; Seiringer, Robert; Solovej, Jan Philip; Yngvason, Jakob. The mathematics of the Bose gas and its condensation. Oberwolfach Seminars, 34. Birkhäuser Verlag, Basel, 2005. viii+203 pp. ISBN 978-3-7643-7336-8; 3-7643-7336-9

Articles

- Statistical mechanics. Selecta of Elliott H. Lieb. Edited, with a preface and commentaries, by B. Nachtergaele, J. P. Solovej and J. Yngvason. Springer-Verlag, Berlin, 2004. x+505 pp. ISBN 3-540-22297-9
- Condensed matter physics and exactly soluble models. Selecta of Elliott H. Lieb. Edited by B. Nachtergaele, J. P. Solovej and J. Yngvason. Springer-Verlag, Berlin, 2004. x+675 pp. ISBN 3-540-22298-7
- The Stability of Matter: From Atoms to Stars. Selecta of Elliott H. Lieb (4th edition). Edited by W. Thirring, with a preface by F. Dyson. Springer-Verlag, Berlin, 2005. xv+932 pp. ISBN 978-3-540-22212-5
- Inequalities. Selecta of Elliott H. Lieb. Edited, with a preface and commentaries, by M. Loss and M. B. Ruskai. Springer-Verlag, Berlin, 2002. xi+711 pp. ISBN 3-540-43021-0

As editor

- Lieb, Elliott H. and Mattis, Daniel C., editors. Mathematical Physics in One Dimension: Exactly Soluble Models of Interacting Particles, Academic Press, New York, 1966. ISBN 978-0-12-448750-5

Other

- The Physics and Mathematics of Elliott Lieb. Edited by R. L. Frank, A. Laptev, M. Lewin and R. Seiringer. EMS Press, July 2022, 1372 pp. ISBN 978-3-98547-019-8

These are two books published by EMS Press on the occasion of Lieb's 90th birthday, which contain around 50 chapters about his impact on a very broad range of topics and the resulting subsequent developments. Many contributions are of an expository character and thus accessible to non-experts.

== See also ==
- Adiabatic accessibility
- AKLT model
- Araki–Lieb–Thirring inequality
- Borell–Brascamp–Lieb inequality
- Brascamp–Lieb inequality
- Brezis–Lieb lemma
- Carlen-Lieb extension
- Entropy
- Ice-type model
- Lieb conjecture on the Wehrl entropy
- Lieb–Liniger Model
- Lieb–Oxford inequality
- Lieb–Robinson bounds
- Lieb–Thirring inequality
- Lieb-Wu equation for the Hubbard model
- Lieb's square ice constant
- Lieb's concavity theorem
- Stability of matter
- Strong subadditivity of quantum entropy
- Temperley–Lieb algebra
- Von Neumann entropy
