= Borell–Brascamp–Lieb inequality =

Theorem in mathematics

In mathematics, the Borell–Brascamp–Lieb inequality is an integral inequality due to many different mathematicians but named after Christer Borell, Herm Jan Brascamp and Elliott Lieb.

The result was proved for p > 0 by Henstock and Macbeath in 1953. The case p = 0 is known as the Prékopa–Leindler inequality and was re-discovered by Brascamp and Lieb in 1976, when they proved the general version below; working independently, Borell had done the same in 1975. The nomenclature of "Borell–Brascamp–Lieb inequality" is due to Cordero-Erausquin, McCann and Schmuckenschläger, who in 2001 generalized the result to Riemannian manifolds such as the sphere and hyperbolic space.

== Statement of the inequality in R^{n} ==
Let 0 < λ < 1, let −1 / n ≤ p ≤ +∞, and let f, g, h : R^{n} → [0, +∞) be integrable functions such that, for all x and y in R^{n},

$$h \left( (1 - \lambda) x + \lambda y \right) \geq M_{p} \left( f(x), g(y), \lambda \right),$$

where

$$\begin{align}
M_{p} (a, b, \lambda) =
\begin{cases}
&\left( (1 - \lambda) a^{p} + \lambda b^{p} \right)^{1/p} \; \quad \text{if} \quad ab\neq 0\\
&0  \quad \text{if} \quad ab=0
\end{cases}
\end{align}$$

and $M_{0}(a,b,\lambda) = a^{1-\lambda}b^{\lambda}$.

Then

$$\int_{\mathbb{R}^{n}} h(x) \, \mathrm{d} x \geq M_{p / (n p + 1)} \left( \int_{\mathbb{R}^{n}} f(x) \, \mathrm{d} x, \int_{\mathbb{R}^{n}} g(x) \, \mathrm{d} x, \lambda \right).$$

(When p = −1 / n, the convention is to take p / (n p + 1) to be −∞; when p = +∞, it is taken to be 1 / n.)
