= Derek W. Robinson =

British-Australian mathematician (1935–2021)

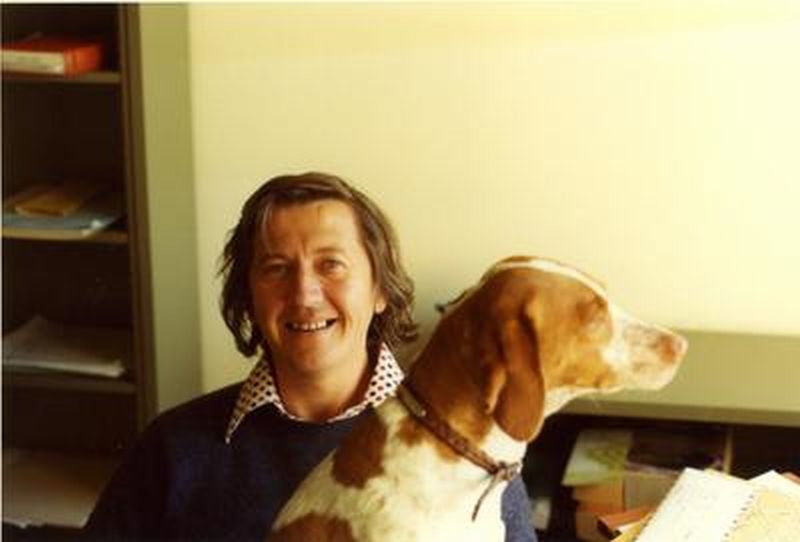
Robinson in 1975

Derek William Robinson FAA (25 June 1935 – 31 August 2021) was a British-Australian theoretical mathematician and physicist. He was a researcher at the Australian National University.

== Early life ==
Derek W. Robinson was born in southern England. He attended grammar school followed by the University of Oxford where he earned a Bachelor of Arts with honours in mathematics in 1957 and a PhD in nuclear physics in 1960 with the dissertation, Multiple Coulomb Excitations in Deformed Nuclei. His PhD advisor was David M. Brink.

== Research ==
His academic focus became the mathematics behind quantum mechanics, which led him to research facilities all over the world. From 1960 to 1962, he was at the ETH Zurich, Switzerland. He then served as a research associate at the University of Illinois for two years, after which he was a research associate at the Max Planck Institute in Munich, Germany from 1964 to 1965. He also spent a year as a professor at Aix-Marseille University, followed by two years as a research associate at CERN in Geneva, Switzerland, followed by another stint as a professor at the Aix Marseille University between 1968 and 1977. He served as the president of the Department of Physics from 1973 to 1975 and the assistant director of the Centre de Physique at CNRS in Marseille from 1974 to 1978.

=== Australia ===
In 1978, he moved his family to Sydney, Australia, where he became a Professor of Pure Mathematics at the University of New South Wales until 1982. From 1982 until his retirement in 2000, he was a Professor of Mathematics at the Centre for Mathematics and its Applications at the Australian National University. From 2000, he continued doing grant-funded research based at Australia National University until his death in 2021. He also served as Chairman of the Board for the Institute for Advanced Studies from 1988 to 1992. In 1980, he was inducted as a Fellow of the Australian Academy of Science.

== Papers and accomplishments ==
Robinson is best known for the discovery of Lieb-Robinson bounds, the theoretical upper limit for the speed of information propagation in a non-relativistic quantum system. He is also known for writing, with Ola Bratteli a two-volume work titled, Operator Algebras and Quantum Statistical Mechanics.

He received the Thomas Ranken Lyle Medal by the Australian Academy of Science in 1981. In 2001, he received the Centenary Medal.

He was also a world-class cyclist, having won Time Trials Championship in the International Masters Games Melbourne in 2002 in the Men 65-69 category.
