= Walter Thirring =

Austrian physicist

Walter E. Thirring
- Born: 29 April 1927; Vienna, Austria
- Died: 19 August 2014 (aged 87); Vienna, Austria
- Education: University of Innsbruck (Ph.D., 1949)
- Known for: Thirring model Thirring–Wess model Lieb-Thirring inequality
- Parent: Hans Thirring (father)
- Awards: Erwin Schrödinger Prize (1969); Max Planck Medal (1978); Henri Poincaré Prize (2000)
- Scientific career
- Fields: Theoretical physics
- Workplaces: University of Vienna
- Doctoral advisor: Felix Ehrenhaft
- Doctoral students: Peter C. Aichelburg; Peter Freund; Peter Grassberger

Walter Eduard Thirring (29 April 1927 – 19 August 2014) was an Austrian physicist after whom the Thirring model in quantum field theory is named. He was the son of the physicist Hans Thirring.

== Life and career ==
Walter Thirring was born in Vienna, Austria, where he earned his Doctor of Physics degree in 1949 at the age of 22. In 1959 he became a professor of theoretical physics at the University of Vienna, and from 1968 to 1971 he was head of the Theory Division and director at CERN.

High-energy physics was Walter's earliest scientific interest. Important papers include the first rigorous proof of divergence of perturbation series in a quantum field theory and the discovery of an exactly soluble model in relativistic quantum field theory, known as the Thirring model. That 1958 work, not Sin-itiro Tomonaga's paper as occasionally alleged, was the source for Joaquin Luttinger's important model in condensed-matter physics and for "bosonization." Walter's 1955 monograph on quantum electrodynamics was highly influential. Two remarkable papers he published in Nuclear Physics in 1959 and 1960 contain ideas pointing to the eightfold way and the theory of quarks developed later by Murray Gell-Mann and Yuval Ne'eman.

Besides pioneering work in quantum field theory, Walter Thirring devoted his scientific life to mathematical physics. He is the author of one of the first textbooks on quantum electrodynamics as well as of a four-volume course in mathematical physics.

In 2000, he received the Henri Poincaré Prize of the International Association of Mathematical Physics.

Walter Thirring authored Cosmic Impressions, Templeton Press, Philadelphia and London, in 2007, and in that book he sums up his feelings about the scientific discoveries made by modern cosmology:

In the last decades, new worlds have been unveiled that our great teachers wouldn't have even dreamed of. The panorama of cosmic evolution now enables deep insights into the blueprint of creation… Human beings recognize the blueprints, and understand the language of the Creator… These realizations do not make science the enemy of religion, but glorify the book of Genesis in the Bible.

His memoirs were published in 2010 as The Joy of Discovery: Great Encounters Along the Way by World Scientific Publishing Company. He recollects encounters with scientists like Albert Einstein, Erwin Schrödinger, Werner Heisenberg, Wolfgang Pauli and others as well as his collaborations with Murray Gell-Mann and Elliott Lieb.

== Honours and awards ==
- Eötvös Medal (1967)
- Erwin Schrödinger Prize (1969)
- Max Planck Medal of the German Physical Society (1978)
- Prize of the city of Vienna (1978)
- Austrian Decoration for Science and Art (1993)
- Honorary Medal of the Austrian capital Vienna in Gold (1993)
- Honorary doctorate from the Comenius University in Bratislava (1994)
- Henri Poincaré Prize of IAMP (International Association of Mathematical Physics) 2000
- Member of the Austrian Academy of Sciences
- Member of the German Academy of Sciences Leopoldina, Halle
- Member of the Pontifical Academy of Sciences, Rome
- Member of the National Academy of Sciences, USA
- Member of the Academia Europaea
- Member of the Hungarian Academy of Sciences

== Works ==
- Selected papers of Walter E. Thirring with Commentaries. American Mathematical Society, 1998, ISBN 0821808125
- Einführung in die Quantenelektrodynamik. Deuticke, Wien 1955
  - Principles of quantum electrodynamics. Academic Press, New York 1958; 2nd edn. 1962
- with Ernest M. Henley: Elementare Quantenfeldtheorie. BI Verlag, Mannheim 1975
- Erfolge und Misserfolge der theoretischen Physik. In: Physikalische Blätter Jg. 33 (1977), p. 542ff. (Singularitäty theorem of Stephen Hawking and Roger Penrose, KAM-theory, stability of matter, lecture delivered at the presentation of the Max Planck medal)
- Lehrbuch der Mathematischen Physik. Springer (trans. into English by Evans M. Harrell as A course in mathematical physics)
  - 1. Klassische Dynamische Systeme. 1977, ISBN 3-211-82089-2; trans. as Classical dynamical systems (1978)
  - 2. Klassische Feldtheorie. 1978, ISBN 3-211-82169-4; trans. as Classical field theory (1978)
  - 3. Quantenmechanik von Atomen und Molekülen. 1979, ISBN 3-211-82535-5; trans. as Quantum mechanics of atoms and molecules (1979)
  - 4. Quantenmechanik großer Systeme. 1980, ISBN 3-211-81604-6; trans. as Quantum mechanics of large systems (1983)
- Stabilität der Materie. In: Naturwissenschaften. Springer, Berlin Jg. 73 (1986), p. 705ff.
- Kosmische Impressionen. Gottes Spuren in den Naturgesetzen. Molden, Wien 2004, ISBN 3-85485-110-3
- Einstein entformelt. Wie ein Teenager ihm auf die Schliche kam. Seifert Verlag, Wien 2007, co-author Cornelia Faustmann, ISBN 3-902-40642-9
- Lust am Forschen: Lebensweg und Begegnungen. Seifert Verlag, Wien 2008, ISBN 978-3902406583
