= Robert Seiringer =

Austrian physicist

Robert Seiringer (1 September 1976, Vöcklabruck) is an Austrian mathematical physicist.

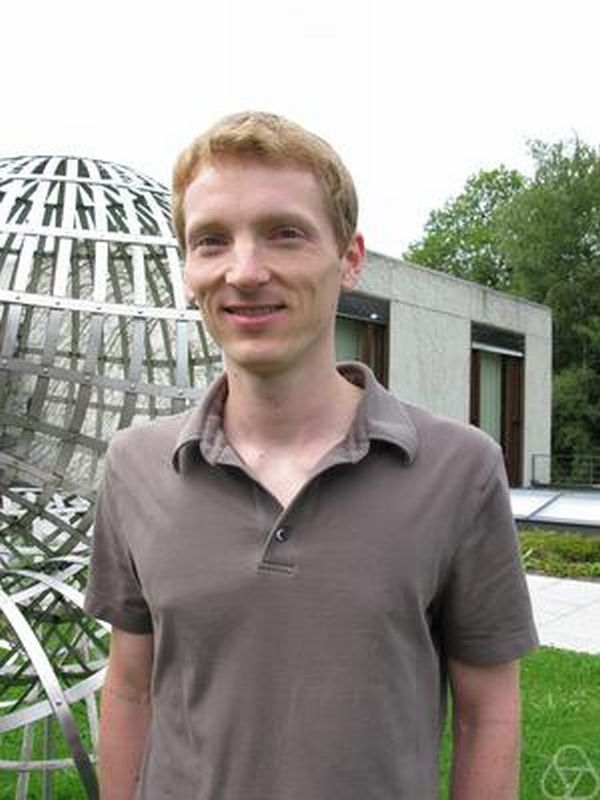
Seiringer at Oberwolfach, 2008

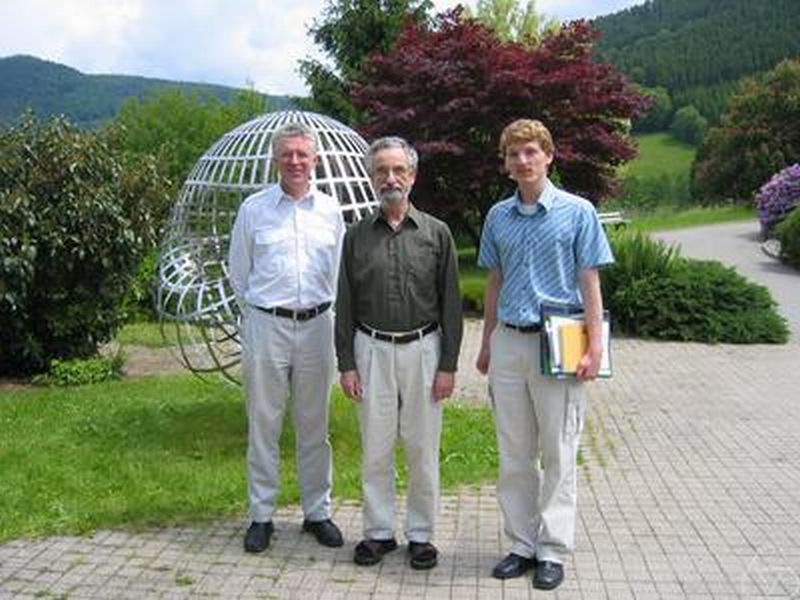
Yngvason (left), Lieb, Seiringer (right) in Oberwolfach in 2004

== Life and work ==
Seiringer studied physics at the University of Vienna, where in 1999 he acquired his diploma and in 2000 with Jakob Yngvason as thesis advisor attained a doctorate. In 2005 he attained his habilitation qualification at the University of Vienna. With a Schrödinger scholarship, he went in 2001 to Princeton University. There he became in 2003 assistant professor. Starting from 2010 he is an associate professor at McGill University. In addition he is extraordinarius professor at the University of Vienna. Since 2013 he is a full professor at the Institute of Science and Technology Austria (ISTA) in Klosterneuburg, Austria.

Seiringer made substantial progress in the mathematical theory of quantum gases and particularly Bose–Einstein condensate (BEC). He partly proved the existence of BEC for interacting boson gases in the Gross–Pitaevskii limit in collaboration with Elliott Lieb. They proved also superfluidity in this limit and derived the Gross–Pitaevskii equation in the special case of BEC in rotating containers.

== Recognition ==
In 2009 Seiringer received the Henri Poincaré Prize for "major contributions to the mathematical analysis of low temperature condensed matter systems, in particular for his work on Bose condensation and the Gross-Pitaevskii equation".

He was elected as a Fellow of the American Mathematical Society in the 2020 Class, for "contributions to mathematical physics and analysis in many-body quantum physics, and for service to the mathematical community".

In 2023 he received the Erwin Schrödinger Prize of the Austrian Academy of Sciences.

== Works ==
- Seiringer, Robert (2013). "Hot topics in cold gases". Japanese Journal of Mathematics. 8 (2). Springer Science and Business Media LLC: 185–232. doi:10.1007/s11537-013-1264-5. ISSN 0289-2316. S2CID 255316109.
- Lieb, Elliott H.; Seiringer, Robert (2010). The stability of matter in quantum mechanics. Cambridge, UK: Cambridge University Press. ISBN 978-0-511-81968-1. OCLC 667042791.

== Sources ==
- Laudatio by Yngvason on the Poincaré Prize für Seiringer, pdf file
