= Lieb–Thirring inequality =

Inequality in mathematical physics

In mathematics and physics, Lieb–Thirring inequalities provide an upper bound on the sums of powers of the negative eigenvalues of a Schrödinger operator in terms of integrals of the potential. They are named after E. H. Lieb and W. E. Thirring.

The inequalities are useful in studies of quantum mechanics and differential equations and imply, as a corollary, a lower bound on the kinetic energy of $N$ quantum mechanical particles that plays an important role in the proof of stability of matter.

== Statement of the inequalities ==
For the Schrödinger operator $-\Delta+V(x)=-\nabla^2+V(x)$ on $\Reals^n$ with real-valued potential $V(x) : \Reals^n \to \Reals,$ the numbers $\lambda_1\le\lambda_2\le\dots\le0$ denote the (not necessarily finite) sequence of negative eigenvalues. Then, for $\gamma$ and $n$ satisfying one of the conditions

$$\begin{align}
\gamma \ge \frac12&,\,n=1,\\
\gamma > 0&,\,n=2,\\
\gamma \ge 0&,\,n\ge3,
\end{align}$$

there exists a constant $L_{\gamma,n}$, which only depends on $\gamma$ and $n$, such that

$\sum_{j \ge 1}|\lambda_j|^\gamma \le L_{\gamma,n}\int_{\Reals^n}V(x)_-^{\gamma + \frac n2}\mathrm{d}^n x$	1

where $V(x)_- := \max(-V(x),0)$ is the negative part of the potential $V$. The cases $\gamma>1/2,n=1$ as well as $\gamma>0,n\ge2$ were proven by E. H. Lieb and W. E. Thirring in 1976 and used in their proof of stability of matter. In the case $\gamma=0, n\ge3$ the left-hand side is simply the number of negative eigenvalues, and proofs were given independently by M. Cwikel, E. H. Lieb and G. V. Rozenbljum. The resulting $\gamma=0$ inequality is thus also called the Cwikel–Lieb–Rosenbljum bound. The remaining critical case $\gamma=1/2, n=1$ was proven to hold by T. Weidl The conditions on $\gamma$ and $n$ are necessary and cannot be relaxed.

== Lieb–Thirring constants ==
=== Semiclassical approximation ===
The Lieb–Thirring inequalities can be compared to the semi-classical limit. The classical phase space consists of pairs $(p, x) \in \Reals^{2n}.$ Identifying the momentum operator $-\mathrm{i}\nabla$ with $p$ and assuming that every quantum state is contained in a volume $(2\pi)^n$ in the $2n$-dimensional phase space, the semi-classical approximation

$$\sum_{j\ge 1}|\lambda_j|^\gamma\approx \frac{1}{(2\pi)^n}\int_{\Reals^n}\int_{\Reals^n}\big(p^2+V(x)\big)_-^\gamma\mathrm{d}^n p\mathrm{d}^n x
=L^{\mathrm{cl}}_{\gamma,n}\int_{\Reals^n} V(x)_-^{\gamma+\frac n2}\mathrm{d}^n x$$

is derived with the constant

$$L_{\gamma,n}^{\mathrm{cl}}=(4\pi)^{-\frac n2}\frac{\Gamma(\gamma+1)}{\Gamma(\gamma+1+\frac n2)}\,.$$

While the semi-classical approximation does not need any assumptions on $\gamma>0$, the Lieb–Thirring inequalities only hold for suitable $\gamma$.

=== Weyl asymptotics and sharp constants ===
Numerous results have been published about the best possible constant $L_{\gamma,n}$ in (1) but this problem is still partly open. The semiclassical approximation becomes exact in the limit of large coupling, that is for potentials $\beta V$ the Weyl asymptotics

$$\lim_{\beta\to\infty}\frac{1}{\beta^{\gamma+\frac n2}}\mathrm{tr} (-\Delta+\beta V)_-^\gamma=L^\mathrm{cl}_{\gamma,n}\int_{\Reals^n} V(x)_-^{\gamma+\frac n2}\mathrm{d}^n x$$

hold. This implies that $L_{\gamma,n}^{\mathrm{cl}}\le L_{\gamma,n}$. Lieb and Thirring were able to show that $L_{\gamma,n}=L_{\gamma,n}^{\mathrm{cl}}$ for $\gamma\ge 3/2, n=1$. M. Aizenman and E. H. Lieb proved that for fixed dimension $n$ the ratio $L_{\gamma,n}/L_{\gamma,n}^{\mathrm{cl}}$ is a monotonic, non-increasing function of $\gamma$. Subsequently $L_{\gamma,n}=L_{\gamma,n}^{\mathrm{cl}}$ was also shown to hold for all $n$ when $\gamma\ge 3/2$ by A. Laptev and T. Weidl. For $\gamma=1/2,\,n=1$ D. Hundertmark, E. H. Lieb and L. E. Thomas proved that the best constant is given by $L_{1/2,1}=2L_{1/2,1}^{\mathrm{cl}}=1/2$.

On the other hand, it is known that $L^\mathrm{cl}_{\gamma,n}<L_{\gamma,n}$ for $1/2\le\gamma<3/2, n=1$ and for $\gamma<1,d\ge1$. In the former case Lieb and Thirring conjectured that the sharp constant is given by

$$L_{\gamma,1} = 2L^\mathrm{cl}_{\gamma,1}\left(\frac{\gamma - \frac12}{\gamma + \frac12}\right)^{\gamma-\frac12}.$$

The best known value for the physical relevant constant $L_{1,3}$ is $1.456 L_{1,3}^\mathrm{cl}$ and the smallest known constant in the Cwikel–Lieb–Rosenbljum inequality is $6.869L_{0,3}^\mathrm{cl}$. A complete survey of the presently best known values for $L_{\gamma,n}$ can be found in the literature.

== Kinetic energy inequalities ==
The Lieb–Thirring inequality for $\gamma=1$ is equivalent to a lower bound on the kinetic energy of a given normalised $N$-particle wave function $\psi\in L^2(\Reals^{Nn})$ in terms of the one-body density. For an anti-symmetric wave function such that

$$\psi(x_1,\dots,x_i,\dots,x_j,\dots,x_N) = -\psi(x_1,\dots,x_j,\dots,x_i,\dots,x_N)$$

for all $1\le i,j\le N$, the one-body density is defined as

$$\rho_\psi(x)
= N\int_{\Reals^{(N-1)n}}|\psi(x,x_2,\dots,x_N)|^2
\mathrm{d}^n x_2\cdots\mathrm{d}^n x_N,\, x \in \Reals^n.$$

The Lieb–Thirring inequality (1) for $\gamma=1$ is equivalent to the statement that

$\sum_{i=1}^N \int_{\Reals^n}|\nabla_i\psi|^2\mathrm{d}^n x_i\ge K_n\int_{\Reals^n}{\rho_\psi(x)^{1+\frac 2n}}\mathrm{d}^n x$	2

where the sharp constant $K_n$ is defined via

$$\left(\left(1+\frac2n\right)K_n\right)^{1+\frac n2}\left(\left(1+\frac n2\right)L_{1,n}\right)^{1+\frac2n}=1\,.$$

The inequality can be extended to particles with spin states by replacing the one-body density by the spin-summed one-body density. The constant $K_n$ then has to be replaced by $K_n/q^{2/n}$ where $q$ is the number of quantum spin states available to each particle ($q=2$ for electrons). If the wave function is symmetric, instead of anti-symmetric, such that

$$\psi(x_1,\dots,x_i,\dots,x_j,\dots,x_n) = \psi(x_1,\dots,x_j,\dots,x_i,\dots,x_n)$$

for all $1 \le i, j \le N$, the constant $K_n$ has to be replaced by $K_n/N^{2/n}$. Inequality (2) describes the minimum kinetic energy necessary to achieve a given density $\rho_\psi$ with $N$ particles in $n$ dimensions. If $L_{1,3}=L^\mathrm{cl}_{1,3}$ was proven to hold, the right-hand side of (2) for $n=3$ would be precisely the kinetic energy term in Thomas–Fermi theory.

The inequality can be compared to the Sobolev inequality. M. Rumin derived the kinetic energy inequality (2) (with a smaller constant) directly without the use of the Lieb–Thirring inequality.

== The stability of matter ==
(for more information, read the Stability of matter page)

The kinetic energy inequality plays an important role in the proof of stability of matter as presented by Lieb and Thirring. The Hamiltonian under consideration describes a system of $N$ particles with $q$ spin states and $M$ fixed nuclei at locations $R_j\in\Reals^3$ with charges $Z_j>0$. The particles and nuclei interact with each other through the electrostatic Coulomb force and an arbitrary magnetic field can be introduced. If the particles under consideration are fermions (i.e. the wave function $\psi$ is antisymmetric), then the kinetic energy inequality (2) holds with the constant $K_n/q^{2/n}$ (not $K_n/N^{2/n}$). This is a crucial ingredient in the proof of stability of matter for a system of fermions. It ensures that the ground state energy $E_{N,M}(Z_1,\dots,Z_M)$ of the system can be bounded from below by a constant depending only on the maximum of the nuclei charges, $Z_{\max}$, times the number of particles,

$$E_{N,M}(Z_1,\dots,Z_M)\ge -C(Z_{\max}) (M+N)\,.$$

The system is then stable of the first kind since the ground-state energy is bounded from below and also stable of the second kind, i.e. the energy of decreases linearly with the number of particles and nuclei. In comparison, if the particles are assumed to be bosons (i.e. the wave function $\psi$ is symmetric), then the kinetic energy inequality (2) holds only with the constant $K_n/N^{2/n}$ and for the ground state energy only a bound of the form $-CN^{5/3}$ holds. Since the power $5/3$ can be shown to be optimal, a system of bosons is stable of the first kind but unstable of the second kind.

== Generalisations ==
If the Laplacian $-\Delta=-\nabla^2$ is replaced by $(\mathrm{i}\nabla+A(x))^2$, where $A(x)$ is a magnetic field vector potential in $\Reals^n,$ the Lieb–Thirring inequality (1) remains true. The proof of this statement uses the diamagnetic inequality. Although all presently known constants $L_{\gamma,n}$ remain unchanged, it is not known whether this is true in general for the best possible constant.

The Laplacian can also be replaced by other powers of $-\Delta$. In particular for the operator $\sqrt{-\Delta}$, a Lieb–Thirring inequality similar to (1) holds with a different constant $L_{\gamma,n}$ and with the power on the right-hand side replaced by $\gamma+n$. Analogously a kinetic inequality similar to (2) holds, with $1+2/n$ replaced by $1+1/n$, which can be used to prove stability of matter for the relativistic Schrödinger operator under additional assumptions on the charges $Z_k$.

In essence, the Lieb–Thirring inequality (1) gives an upper bound on the distances of the eigenvalues $\lambda_j$ to the essential spectrum $[0,\infty)$ in terms of the perturbation $V$. Similar inequalities can be proved for Jacobi operators.

== See also ==
- Birman–Schwinger principle

== Literature ==
- Lieb, E.H.; Seiringer, R. (2010). The stability of matter in quantum mechanics (1st ed.). Cambridge: Cambridge University Press. ISBN 9780521191180.
- Hundertmark, D. (2007). "Some bound state problems in quantum mechanics". In Fritz Gesztesy; Percy Deift; Cherie Galvez; Peter Perry; Wilhelm Schlag (eds.). Spectral Theory and Mathematical Physics: A Festschrift in Honor of Barry Simon's 60th Birthday. Proceedings of Symposia in Pure Mathematics. Vol. 76. Providence, RI: American Mathematical Society. pp. 463–496. Bibcode:2007stmp.conf..463H. ISBN 978-0-8218-3783-2.
