= Department of Mathematics (University of Toronto) =

Academic department at the University of Toronto

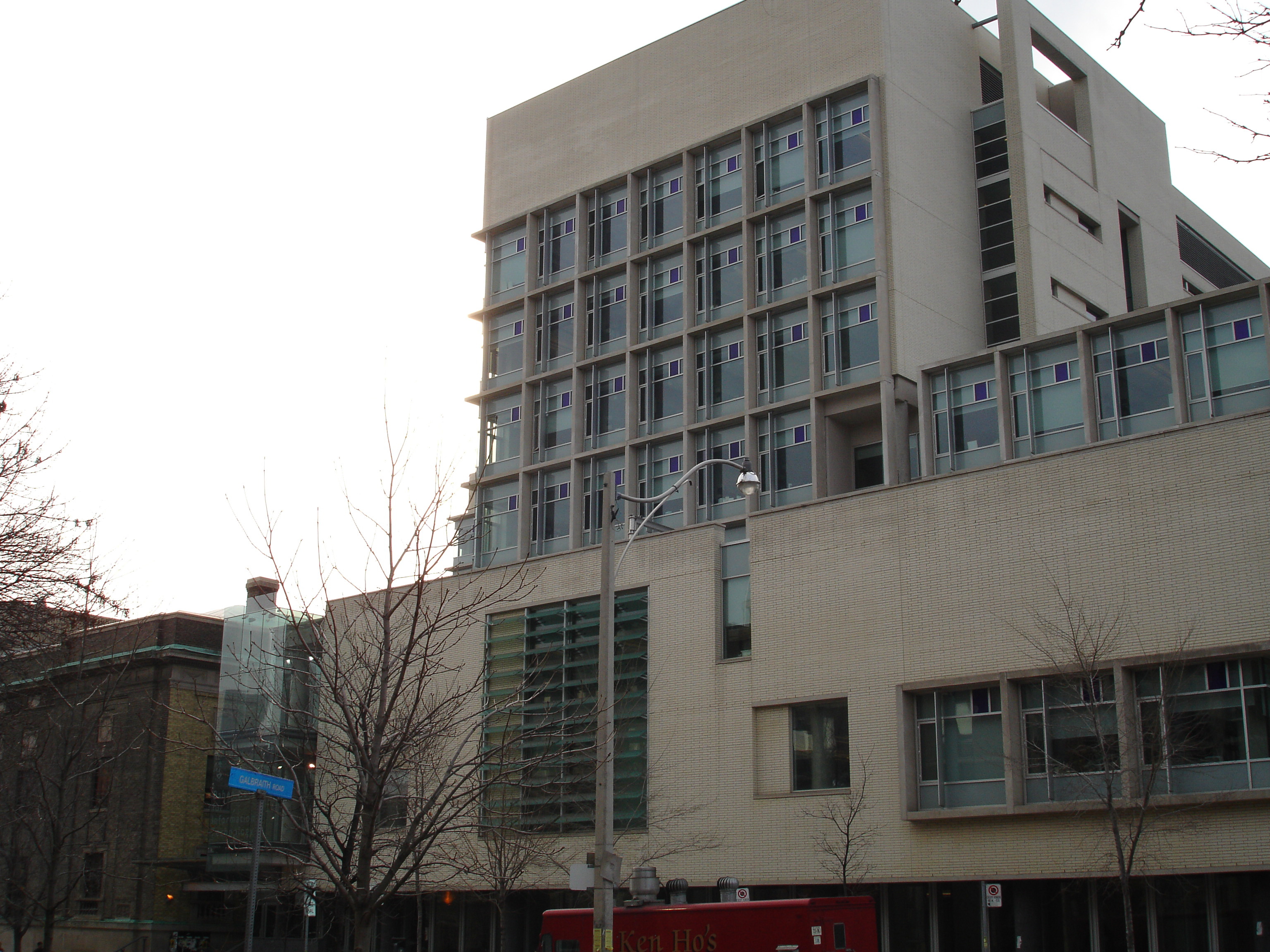
- Bahen Centre, home to the department
- Established: 1843; 183 years ago
- Parent institution: University of Toronto Faculty of Arts and Science
- Chair: Mary Pugh
- Location: Bahen Centre for Information Technology; 40 St. George Street, Toronto, Ontario, Canada
- Website: mathematics.utoronto.ca

The Department of Mathematics at the University of Toronto is an academic department within the Faculty of Arts and Science. It houses undergraduate programs on the St. George campus in addition to the Graduate Department of Mathematics, composed of faculty from all three campuses: St. George, Mississauga, and Scarborough. It is located at the Bahen Centre for Information Technology in downtown Toronto.

In 2018, the University of Toronto was ranked first in Canada for mathematics by the QS World University Rankings, the Times Higher Education World University Rankings, and Maclean's University Rankings.

== History ==
For most of the second half of the 19th century, the University of Toronto was the only English-language university in Canada to offer programs with specializations, one being in mathematics and natural philosophy. The university launched its mathematics program in 1877, which became a model for the rest of Canada during the first half of the 20th century. The Mathematical and Physical Society was founded in 1882 as a mathematics student society.

University College, home of the Mathematics Department from 1859 to 1958

In the early 20th century, the department became the first in North American to explore the field of actuarial science. At the same time, the University of Toronto's mathematics department increasingly took the lead on mathematical research in Canada. Faculty member John Charles Fields, appointed professor in 1902, was perhaps the most important in developing research at Toronto. Fields organized the 1924 International Congress of Mathematicians held in Toronto, and would later found the Fields Medal.

Fields's student, Samuel Beatty, was the first mathematics Ph.D. in Canada, obtaining his degree in 1915 (Beatty would later serve as head of the mathematics department and first president of the Canadian Mathematical Society in 1945). In the next twenty years Toronto produced eight doctorates in mathematics, two of them women, including Cecilia Krieger – the first woman to earn a Ph.D. in mathematics in Canada.

The Department's competitive mathematics team, consisting of Irving Kaplansky, Nathan Mendelsohn and John Coleman, won first place in the first year of the William Lowell Putnam Mathematical Competition in 1938. While competition rules prevented the University of Toronto from entering a team the following year, the team in won again in 1940, 1942 and 1946.

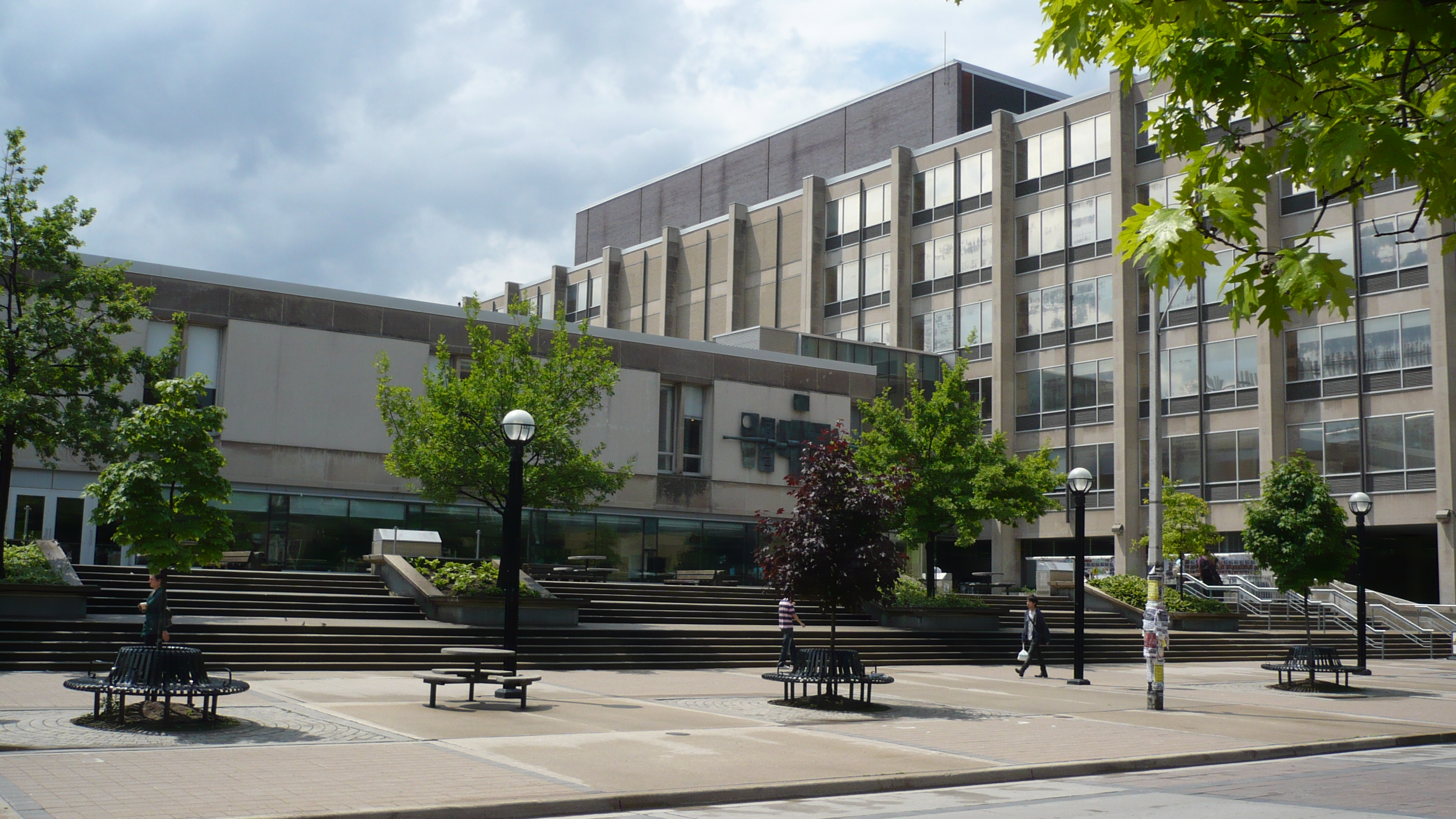
Sidney Smith Hall, home of the Mathematics Department from 1961 to 2006

Meanwhile, the first Canadian mathematics journal, Canadian Journal of Mathematics, began publication by University of Toronto Press in 1949, with faculty members Harold Coxeter and Gilbert de Beauregard Robinson as Editor-in-Chief and Managing Editor, respectively.

The department moved from University College to Baldwin House in 1958, and then to Sidney Smith Hall upon its completion in 1961. The statistics sub-department, first established in 1947, became a separate department in 1978.

The department was one of the founders of the Fields Institute for Research in Mathematical Sciences in 1991. Initially based at the University of Waterloo, the institute is now located at the University of Toronto. In 2006, the Department of Mathematics moved to the sixth floor of the Bahen Centre for Information Technology, located directly behind the Fields Institute.

Today, it is one of three mathematics departments at the University of Toronto, alongside the Department of Mathematical and Computational Sciences at the Mississauga campus and Department of Computer and Mathematical Sciences at the Scarborough campus. It houses undergraduate mathematics programs on the St. George campus and the tri-campus Graduate Department of Mathematics.

== Academics ==
=== Awards and medals ===
Of the 120 current Fellows of the Royal Society of Canada in the discipline of Mathematics and Computer Sciences, 21 (or 18%) are members of the University of Toronto's Department of Mathematics.

A number of individuals affiliated with the department have won international prizes for their research in mathematics, including the Fields Medal, the Wolf Prize, the Steele Prize, the Cole Prize, the Clay Research Award, and the Sloan Fellowship.

=== Rankings ===
In the 2018 QS World University Rankings, the University of Toronto was ranked nineteenth in the world in the subject of Mathematics. The university was ranked first in Canada for Mathematics in 2018 by the Maclean's University Rankings, the Times Higher Education World University Rankings, and the QS World University Rankings.

== Notable members ==
=== Alumni ===
Notable alumni of the Department include Arthur Dempster, Clifford Dowker, Donald Fraser, Irving Kaplansky, Walter Kohn, J. Carson Mark (Ph.D. 1938), Nathan Mendelsohn, John Mighton (Ph.D. 2000), Robert Moody (Ph.D. 1966), Cathleen Morawetz, Gordon Slade, Robert Steinberg (Ph.D. 1948), James Stewart (Ph.D. 1967), and Albert Tucker.

=== Current members ===
- James Arthur CC FRSC FRS; CRM-Fields-PIMS Prize (1997), Wolf Prize (2015), Steele Prize (2017)
- Edward Barbeau
- Dror Bar-Natan
- Edward Bierstone FRSC
- Stephen Cook OC FRSC FRS; Turing Award (1982), CRM-Fields-PIMS Prize (1999)
- Derek Corneil
- Chandler Davis
- George Elliott FRSC
- John Friedlander FRSC
- Lisa Jeffrey FRSC
- Victor Ivrii FRSC
- Yael Karshon
- Boris Khesin
- Askold Khovanskii
- Stephen Kudla FRSC; Sloan Fellowship (1981)
- Robert McCann FRSC
- Eckhard Meinrenken FRSC
- Pierre Milman FRSC
- Kumar Murty FRSC
- Alexander Nabutovsky
- Toniann Pitassi
- Mary Pugh
- Jeremy Quastel FRSC; Sloan Fellowship (1996–98), CRM-Fields-PIMS Prize (2018)
- Jeff Rosenthal FRSC
- Arul Shankar; Sloan Fellowship (2018)
- Israel Sigal FRSC
- Catherine Sulem FRSC
- Stevo Todorčević FRSC; CRM-Fields-PIMS Prize (2012)
- Jacob Tsimerman; Fields Medal (2026)
- Luis A. Seco

=== Former members ===
- Frederick Atkinson FRSC, Professor (1960–2002)
- Artur Avila, Visitor (2011); Fields Medal (2014)
- Samuel Beatty, Professor (1911–33) and Chair (1934–52)
- Richard Brauer, Professor (1935–48); Cole Prize (1949)
- James Colliander, Professor (2001–2015); Sloan Fellowship (2003)
- Harold Coxeter CC FRSC FRS, Professor (1936–80); CRM-Fields-PIMS Prize (1995), Sylvester Medal (1997)
- Arthur Dempster, Lecturer (1957–58)
- Gabriel Andrew Dirac, Lecturer (1952–53)
- George Duff FRSC, Professor (1952–92) and Chair (1968–75)
- John Charles Fields FRSC FRS, Professor (1902–32)
- Larry Guth, Assistant Professor (2008–11); Clay Research Award (2015)
- Israel Halperin CM FRSC, Professor (1966–78)
- Hans Heilbronn FRS, Professor (1964–75)
- Leopold Infeld, Professor (1938–50)
- William Kahan, Professor (1963–70); Turing Award (1989)
- Cecilia Krieger, Professor (1928–69)
- George Lorentz, Assistant Professor (1950–54); Humboldt Prize (1973)
- Louis Mordell FRS, Lecturer (1953–55); Smith's Prize (1912), De Morgan Medal (1941), Sylvester Medal (1949)
- Abraham Robinson, Professor (1952–57)
- Gilbert de Beauregard Robinson FRSC, Professor (1929–30, 1931–71)
- Ralph Gordon Stanton, Assistant Professor (1950–58)
- John Synge FRSC FRS, Assistant Professor (1920–25, 1930–43)
- William Tutte OC FRSC FRS, Associate Professor (1948–62); CRM-Fields-PIMS Prize (2001)
- Maria Wonenburger, Associate Professor (1962–66)
- Maciej Zworski FRSC, Professor (1995–2000)

== See also ==
- List of academic units of the University of Toronto
- Computer science at the University of Toronto
- Fields Institute for Research in Mathematical Sciences
