= Aisenstadt Prize =

Canadian mathematics award

The André Aisenstadt Prize recognizes a young Canadian mathematician's outstanding achievement in pure or applied mathematics.

It has been awarded annually since 1992 (except in 1994, when no prize was given) by the Centre de Recherches Mathématiques at the University of Montreal. The prize consists of a $3,000 award and a medal. It is named after André Aisenstadt.

== Prize winners ==
- 2026 Benjamin Landon (University of Toronto)
- 2025 Carlo Pagano (Concordia University)
- 2024 Alexander Kupers (University of Toronto Scarborough)
- 2023 Elina Robeva (University of British Columbia) and Yakov Shlapentokh-Rothman (University of Toronto)
- 2022 Yevgeny Liokumovich (University of Toronto)
- 2021 Giulio Tiozzo (University of Toronto) and Tristan C. Collins (Massachusetts Institute of Technology)
- 2020 Robert Haslhofer (University of Toronto) and Egor Shelukhin (Université de Montréal)
- 2019 Yaniv Plan (University of British Columbia)
- 2018 Benjamin Rossman (University of Toronto)
- 2017 Jacob Tsimerman (University of Toronto)
- 2016 Anne Broadbent (University of Ottawa)
- 2015 Louis-Pierre Arguin (University of Montréal and the City University of New York – Baruch College and Graduate Center)
- 2014 Sabin Cautis of the University of British Columbia
- 2013 Spyros Alexakis of the University of Toronto
- 2012 Marco Gualtieri of the University of Toronto and Young-Heon Kim of the University of British Columbia
- 2011 Joel Kamnitzer of the University of Toronto
- 2010 Omer Angel of the University of British Columbia
- 2009 Valentin Blomer of the University of Toronto
- 2008 József Solymosi of the University of British Columbia and Jonathan Taylor of the University of Montreal.
- 2007 Greg Smith of Queen's University and Alexander Holroyd of the University of British Columbia.
- 2006 Iosif Polterovich of the University of Montreal and Tai-Peng Tsai of the University of British Columbia
- 2005 Ravi Vakil of Stanford University
- 2004 Vinayak Vatsal of the University of British Columbia
- 2003 Alexander Brudnyi of the University of Calgary
- 2002 Jingyi Chen of the University of British Columbia
- 2001 Eckhard Meinrenken of the University of Toronto
- 2000 Changfeng Gui of the University of Connecticut
- 1999 John Toth of McGill University
- 1998 Boris A. Khesin of the University of Toronto
- 1997 Lisa Jeffrey and Henri Darmon of McGill University
- 1996 Adrian Stephen Lewis of Cornell University
- 1995 Nigel Higson of Pennsylvania State University and Michael J. Ward of the University of British Columbia
- 1994 No award
- 1993 Ian F. Putnam of the University of Victoria
- 1992 Niky Kamran of McGill University

== See also ==
- List of mathematics awards
