= Anna Goldenberg =

Russian-born computer scientist

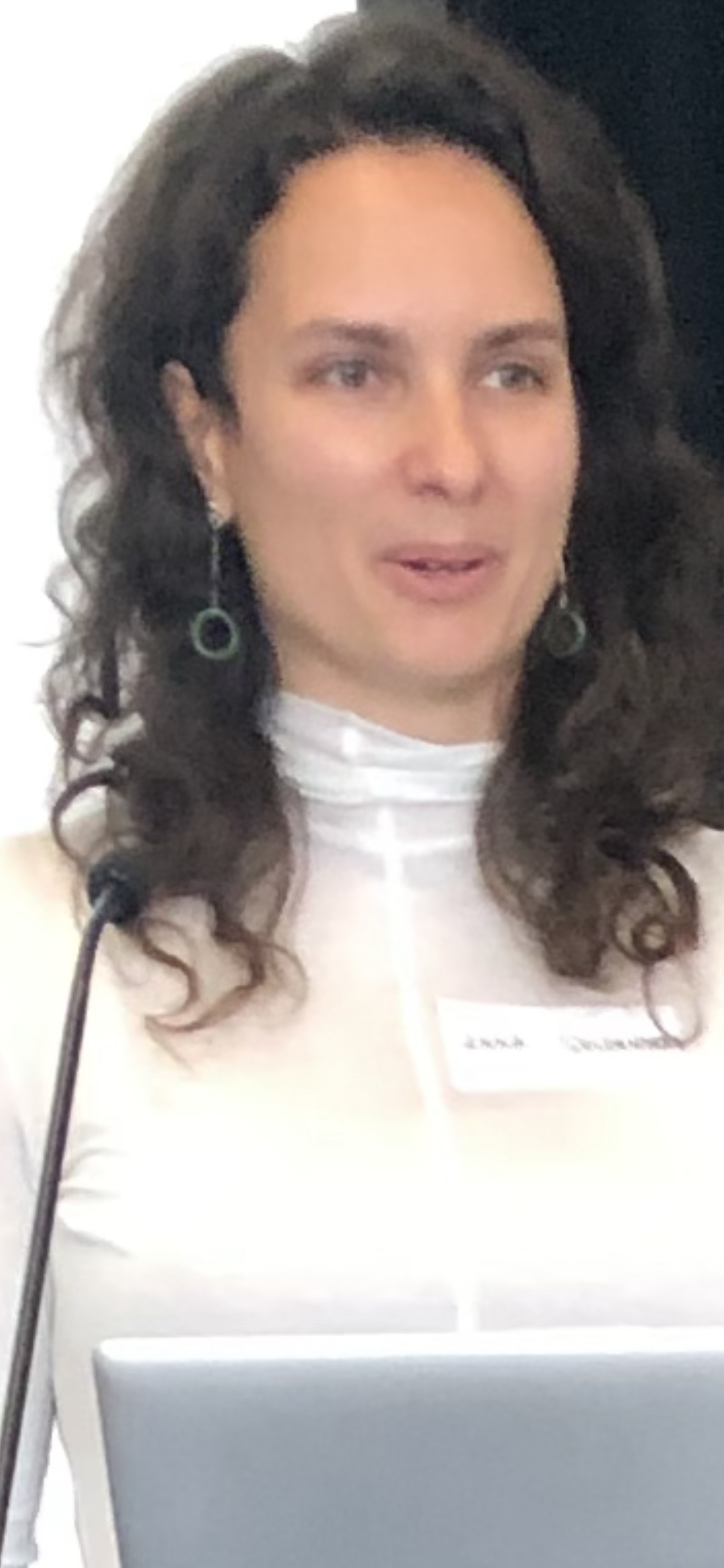
- Born: Voronezh, Russia
- Education: University of Louisville; Carnegie Mellon University
- Awards: Early Researcher Award from Ministry of Research and Innovation
- Scientific career
- Thesis: Scalable Graphical Models for Social Networks (2007)
- Website: goldenberglab.ca

Anna Goldenberg is a Russian-born computer scientist and a full professor at the University of Toronto's Department of Computer Science and Department of Laboratory Medicine and Pathobiology, a senior scientist at the Hospital for Sick Children's Research Institute and the Associate Research Director for health at the Vector Institute. She is the first chair in biomedical informatics and artificial intelligence at the Hospital for Sick Children.

== Early life and education ==
As a young child born and raised in Voronezh, Russia, Goldenberg faced antisemitism in school. Eventually, in 1995, when she was 17 years old, Goldenberg's family left Russia and moved to Kentucky, U.S.A. There, Goldenberg completed a Bachelor of Engineering degree, in Engineering Mathematics and Computer Science, at the University of Louisville.

Goldenberg completed a Master's in Knowledge Discovery & Data Mining, followed by a PhD in machine learning at Carnegie Mellon University in Pittsburgh, where her thesis explored scalable graphical models for social networks. While in graduate school, Goldenberg was close with Joyce Feinberg - who was later one of 11 victims killed in the Pittsburgh's Tree of Life synagogue shooting in October 2018.

== Research career ==
Goldenberg moved to Canada in 2008 as a post-doctoral fellow. She is currently appointed as an associate professor at University of Toronto's Department of Computer Science and the Department of Statistics and a scientist at the Hospital for Sick Children's Research Institute. Her laboratory explores how machine learning can be used to map the heterogeneity seen in various human diseases - specifically to develop methodologies to identify patterns in collected data and improve patient outcomes. She has more than 50 publications in peer-reviewed journals. Similarity Network Fusion, a networking method devised by her research group is the first data integration method developed to integrate patient data which improved survival outcome predictions in different cancers. She has an h-index of 17, and her research has been cited over 2,000 times.

In 2017, Goldenberg was appointed as a new Tier 2 CIHR-funded Canada Research Chair in Computational Medicine at the University of Toronto.

On 15 January 2019, Goldenberg was named the first chair in biomedical informatics and artificial intelligence at the Hospital for Sick Children, which is the first of its kind to exist in a Canadian children's hospital. This position is partially funded by a $1.75 million donation from Amar Varma (a Toronto entrepreneur whose newborn son underwent surgery at the Hospital for Sick Children).

== Selected bibliography ==
- Anna Goldenberg, Galit Shmueli, Richard A Caruana, Stephen E Fienberg. Early statistical detection of anthrax outbreaks by tracking over-the-counter medication sales. Proceedings of the National Academy of Sciences. 2002.
- Anna Goldenberg, Alice X Zheng, Stephen E Fienberg, Edoardo M Airoldi. A survey of statistical network models. Foundations and Trends in Machine Learning. 2010.
- Aziz M Mezlini, Eric JM Smith, Marc Fiume, Orion Buske, Gleb L Savich, Sohrab Shah, Sam Aparicio, Derek Y Chiang, Anna Goldenberg, Michael Brudno. iReckon: simultaneous isoform discovery and abundance estimation from RNA-seq data. Genome Research. 2013.
- Bo Wang, Aziz M Mezlini, Feyyaz Demir, Marc Fiume, Zhuowen Tu, Michael Brudno, Benjamin Haibe-Kains, Anna Goldenberg. Similarity network fusion for aggregating data types on a genomic scale. Nature Methods. 2014.
