= BCIT (disambiguation) =

BCIT stands for British Columbia Institute of Technology, a public polytechnic institution in Burnaby, British Columbia, Canada.

BCIT may also refer to:

- Burlington County Institute of Technology
- BC Rail (reporting mark)
- Bahen Centre for Information Technology at the University of Toronto
