= Alain Fournier =

Alain Fournier may refer to:

- Alain Fournier (academic), French/Canadian computer graphics researcher
- Alain Fournier (animator), Canadian animator and filmmaker
- Alain-Fournier, French writer
