= Yevgeny Liokumovich =

Mathematician and geometer

- Education: University of Toronto
- Known for: Weyl law for the volume spectrum
- Awards: Aisenstadt Prize (2022)
- Scientific career
- Fields: Geometry; Topology; AI safety
- Workplaces: University of Toronto
- Thesis: Sweepouts of Riemannian surfaces (2015)
- Doctoral advisor: Alexander Nabutovsky and Regina Rotman
- Website: www.math.toronto.edu/ylio/

Yevgeny Liokumovich is a mathematician whose research focus on geometry, topology, and AI safety. He is an assistant professor at the University of Toronto Mississauga. In 2016, together with Fernando Codá Marques and André Neves, he solved a conjecture of Mikhael Gromov on a Weyl law for the volume spectrum in compact Riemannian manifolds, which was one of the reasons for which Liokumovich was awarded the André Aisenstadt Prize in 2022.

Liokumovich grew up in Kazakhstan before moving to Canada. He obtained his PhD at the University of Toronto in 2015, with Alexander Nabutovsky and Regina Rotman as advisors, with the thesis Sweepouts of Riemannian surfaces.

He was awarded a Sloan Fellowship in 2021, and a Simons Fellowship in 2025.

== Selected publications ==
- Liokumovich, Yevgeny; Marques, Fernando; Neves, André (2018). "Weyl law for the volume spectrum". Annals of Mathematics. 187 (3): 933–961. arXiv:1607.08721. doi:10.4007/annals.2018.187.3.7. ISSN 0003-486X. https://arxiv.org/abs/1607.08721
- Chodosh, Otis; Li, Chao; Liokumovich, Yevgeny (2023). "Classifying sufficiently connected PSC manifolds in 4 and 5 dimensions". Geometry & Topology. 27 (4): 1635–1655. arXiv:2105.07306. doi:10.2140/gt.2023.27.1635. ISSN 1364-0380. https://arxiv.org/abs/2105.07306
