= Department of Computer Science (University of Toronto) =

Academic department of the University of Toronto

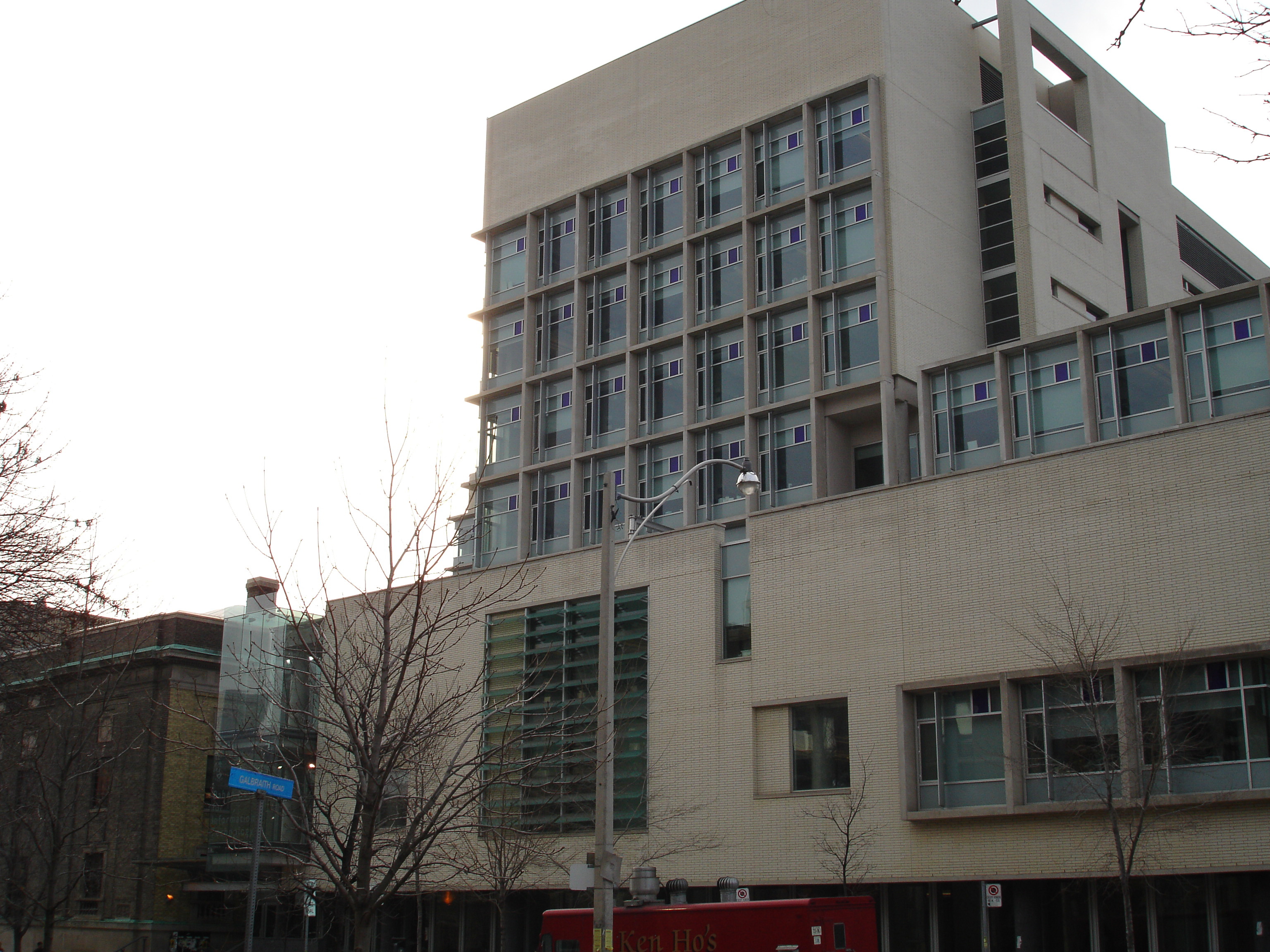
- The Bahen Centre for Information Technology, which houses the department
- Established: 1964; 62 years ago
- Parent institution: University of Toronto Faculty of Arts and Science
- Chair: Eyal de Lara
- Undergraduates: 2,500+
- Postgraduates: 450+
- Location: Toronto, Ontario, Canada; 43°39′34.5″N 79°23′50″W
- Website: cs.toronto.edu

The Department of Computer Science (DCS) at the University of Toronto is an academic department within the Faculty of Arts and Science. It houses undergraduate programs at the St. George campus and the tri-campus Graduate Department of Computer Science. Formally established in 1964, it is the only University of Toronto department that offers graduate programs in computer science (through the School of Graduate Studies). Its main offices are located in the Bahen Centre for Information Technology.

The department has hosted notable faculty known for their contributions to fields such as computational complexity theory and artificial intelligence. University professor emeritus Stephen Cook is credited in his work in advanced understanding of computational complexity theory and NP-completeness, and introduced the unsolved problem of P versus NP in 1971; he received the A.M. Turing Award in 1982. University professor emeritus Geoffrey Hinton is credited for his work in advancing artificial neural networks, which has earned him the title of "the Godfather of AI"; he received the Nobel Prize in Physics in 2024.

== History ==
The Committee on Computing Machines, formed in 1945 by professors Sam Beatty, Bernard Griffith, and V. G. Smith, created Canada's first Computation Centre in a room inside the Physics Building in 1947. They developed the University of Toronto Electronic Computer (UTEC), the first computer in Canada and one of the first working electronic computer prototypes in the world.

The university's first formal computer science department, the Faculty of Arts and Science's Department of Computer Science, was established in 1964 and helped develop one of the earliest interactive computer animation systems in 1967. Computer Science faculty worked to expand Alan Turing's theory of computability to include efficiency, and conducted early work on touchscreen technology in the 1980s. The University of Toronto Mississauga established its Department of Mathematical and Computational Sciences (MCS) in 2003 when the campus separated from the Faculty of Arts and Science and became its own undergraduate division.

In 2012, professor Geoffrey Hinton and graduate students Alex Krizhevsky and Ilya Sutskever (Sutskever would go on to co-found OpenAI) created AlexNet, an image classification neural network which was the first to combine deep neural networks, large datasets, and graphics processing units (GPUs). As of early 2025, the AlexNet paper has been cited over 198,000 times according to Google Scholar.

The University of Toronto announced the Hinton Chair in Artificial Intelligence in 2025, named for professor emeritus and Nobel laureate Geoffrey Hinton. The chair role is supported by a $10 million donation from Google matched by the university.

== Academics ==
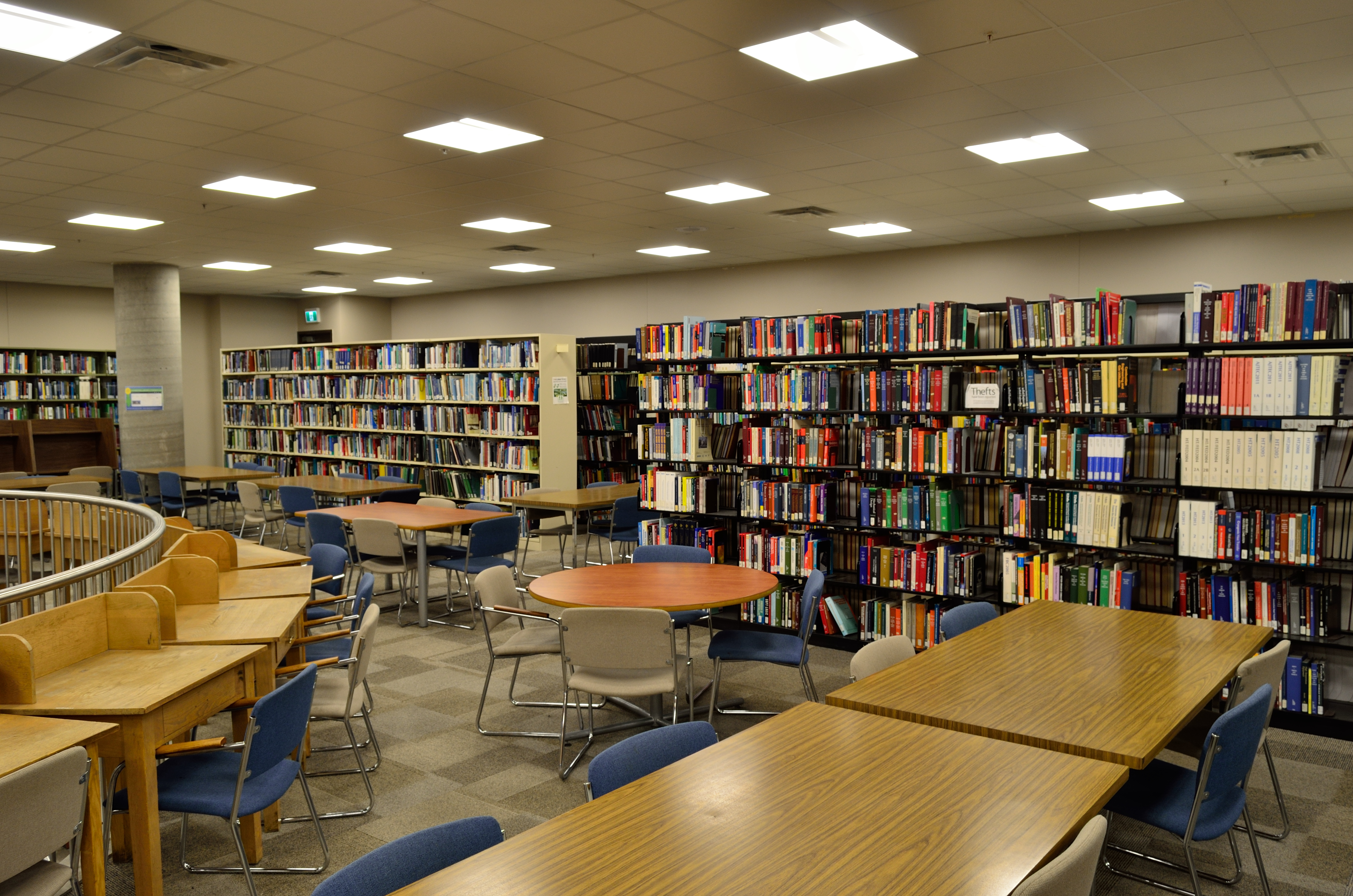
The Engineering and Computer Science Library in the Sandford Fleming Building, St. George campus

Due to the university's unique tri-campus structure, computer science teaching and research is shared between departments and divisions across its campuses, with differences at the undergraduate and graduate level.

=== Undergraduate ===
At the undergraduate level, computer science programs are administered separately at each campus. The Faculty of Arts and Science offers an undergraduate program in computer science on the St. George campus through the Department of Computer Science, with a choice of focuses from artificial intelligence and computer vision to game design and quantitative finance. It also provides courses in data science and a specialist program. The University of Toronto Mississauga hosts undergraduate programs in both computer science and information security through its Department of Mathematical and Computational Sciences. The University of Toronto Scarborough's Department of Computer and Mathematical Sciences offers a program in computer science with options for experiential education and a program in management and information technology on the Scarborough campus. Different areas of its computer science specialist include entrepreneurship, information systems, and software engineering.

=== Graduate ===
The Graduate Department of Computer Science is the university's tri-campus graduate unit for computer science. Although it is administered at St. George, the department is composed of faculty from all three campuses (St. George, Mississauga, and Scarborough) and students in the School of Graduate Studies can affiliate with any campus. The university offers three graduate computer science programs: a Master of Science (MSc), Doctor of Philosophy (PhD), and Master of Science in Applied Computing (MScAC) degree, the latter with concentrations in one of: applied mathematics, artificial intelligence, artificial intelligence in healthcare, computer science, data science, data science for biology, or quantum computing.

=== Research ===
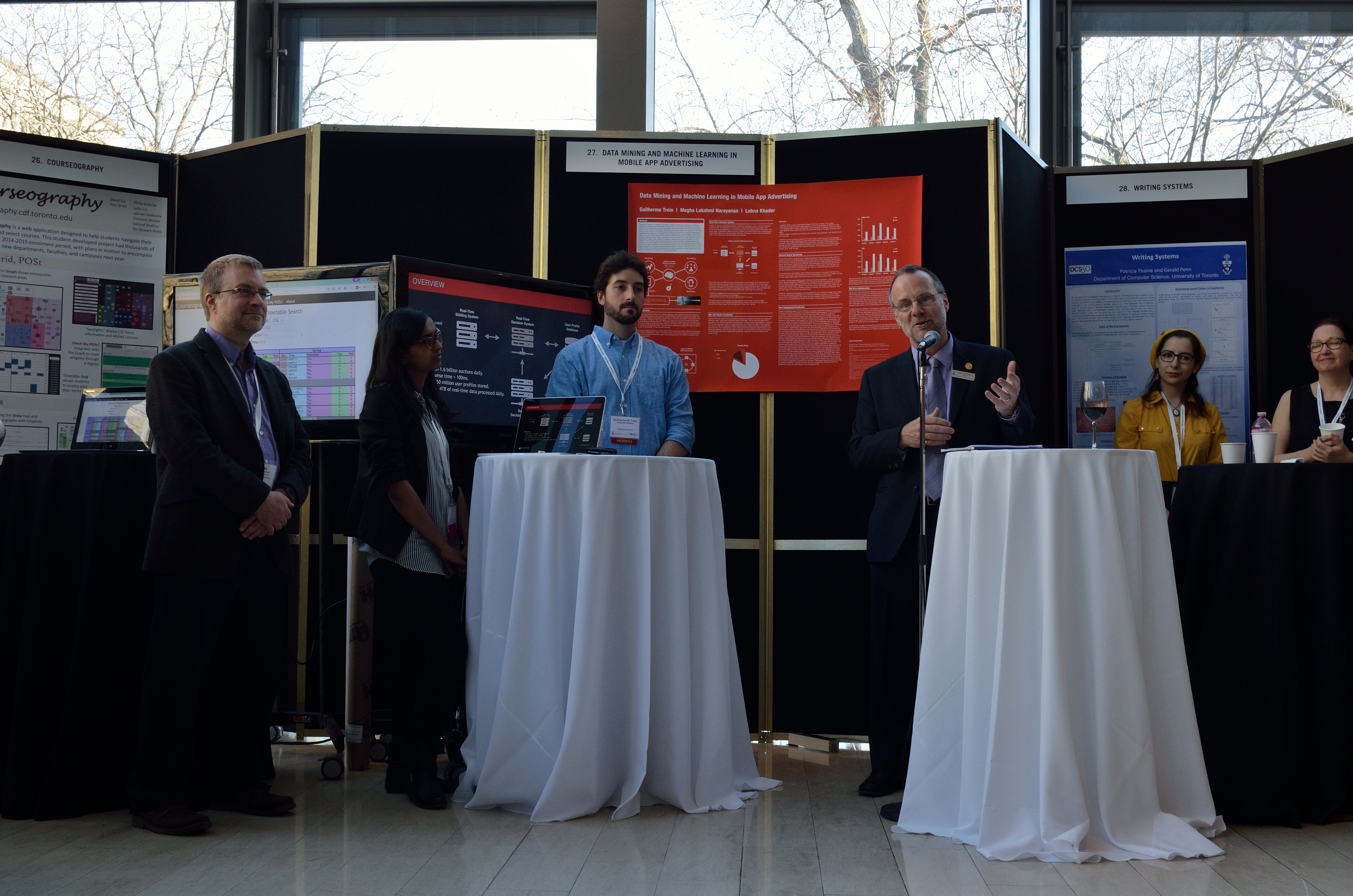
Chair of DCS at the 50th Anniversary Reception

Computer science research at the University of Toronto includes continuum robotics and computer vision in machine learning. The Continuum Robotics Lab on the Mississauga campus is directed by roboticist Jessica Burgner-Kahrs, and researches flexible robotic arms for use in surgery and other areas where humans are limited by mobility and precision.

University of Toronto computer science faculty, including Geoffrey Hinton and Sanja Fidler, vice-president of artificial intelligence research at Nvidia, founded the Vector Institute in 2017, a university-affiliated non-profit artificial intelligence research institute based in Toronto.

Research centres affiliated with computer science faculty include:

- Dynamic Graphics Project
- Vector Institute
- Fields Institute

=== Rankings and reputation ===
The University of Toronto was ranked 12th in the world and first in Canada for computer science and information systems by QS Top Universities' World University Ranking by Subject 2025. It was ranked 23rd in the world and first in Canada for computer science in Times Higher Education's World University Rankings by Subject 2025.

The university ranked third in the world for artificial intelligence in the Academic Ranking of World Universities' 2025 Global Ranking of Academic Subjects.

== Notable tri-campus faculty ==
Notable computer scientist faculty at the University of Toronto have included Stephen Cook, an A.M. Turing Award recipient and founder of the theory of NP-completeness which laid the groundwork for computational complexity theory, and Geoffrey Hinton, the "Godfather of A.I."

Other notable faculty include:

- Alán Aspuru-Guzik
- Fahiem Bacchus
- Ronald Baecker
- Allan Borodin – University Professor and former department chair from 1980 to 1985.
- Jessica Burgner-Kahrs
- Bill Buxton
- Derek Corneil
- David Duvenaud
- Steve M. Easterbrook
- Sanja Fidler – Associate Professor, vice-president of AI research at Nvidia, co-founder of the Vector Institute.
- Brendan Frey
- Anna Goldenberg
- Calvin Gotlieb – Professor and "Father of Computing" in Canada
- Ric Holt
- Konstantin Khanin
- Maria Klawe
- Renée Miller
- Toniann Pitassi
- Charles Rackoff – University Professor Emeritus specializing in cryptography and security protocols.
- Kenneth C. Smith
- Henry Spencer
- Ralph Gordon Stanton
- Demetri Terzopoulos
- Raquel Urtasun – University Professor and researcher in the field of artificial intelligence and deep learning, co-founder of the Vector Institute.
- Beatrice Worsley
- Daniel Zingaro

== See also ==
- List of academic units of the University of Toronto
- Computing education
- Schwartz Reisman Institute
