= Kenneth C. Smith =

Canadian electrical engineer (1932–2023)

Kenneth Carless Smith
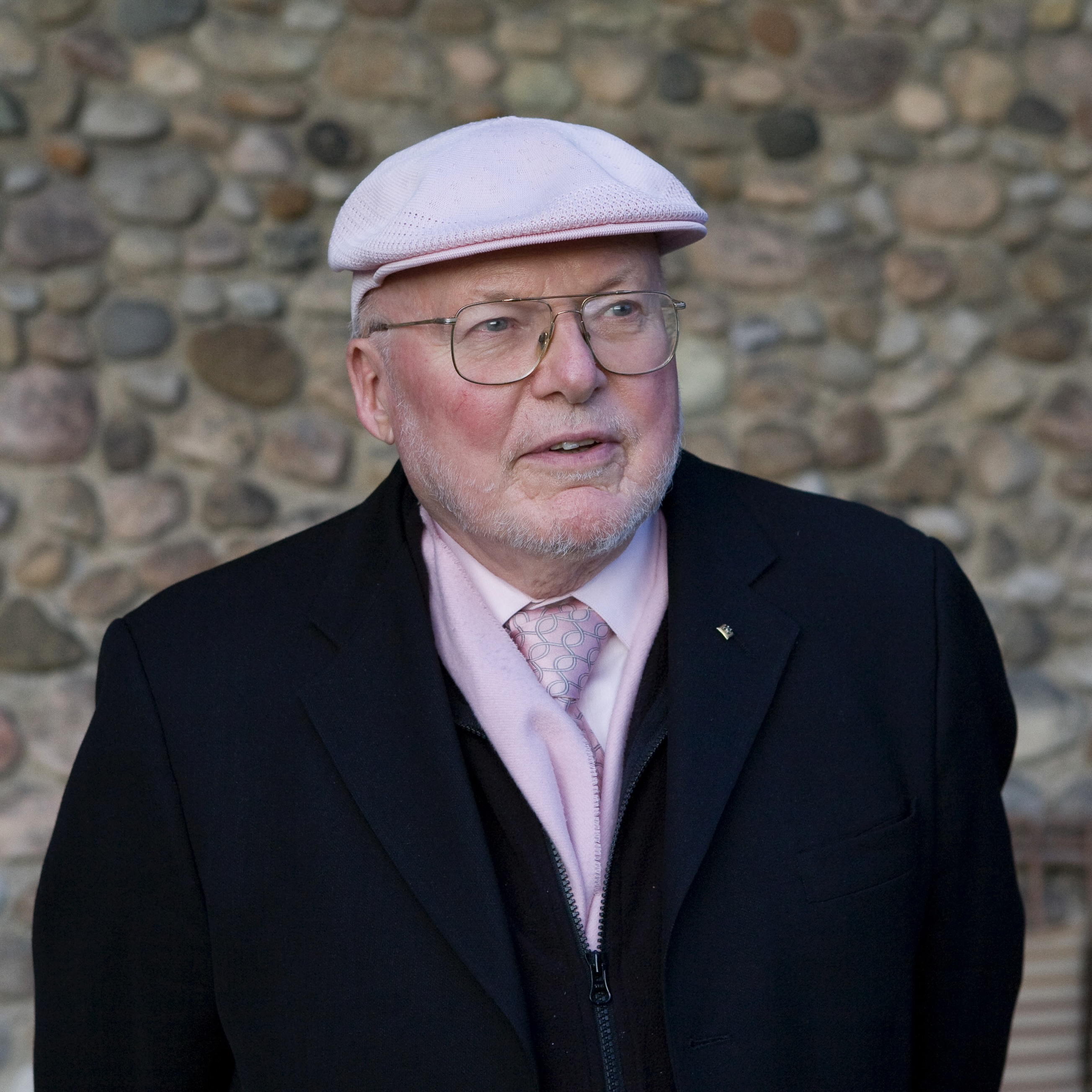
- Kenneth C. Smith, 2009
- Born: May 8, 1932; Toronto, Ontario, Canada
- Died: October 29, 2023 (aged 91); Toronto, Ontario, Canada
- Education: University of Toronto
- Occupations: Professor emeritus, University of Toronto
- Known for: Microelectronics
- Title: Professor
- Scientific career
- Institutions: University of Illinois Urbana-Champaign; University of Toronto
- Doctoral advisor: Robert William McKay
- Doctoral students: Adel Sedra
- Other notable students: Bill Buxton

Professor KC Smith visiting Mann's Phenomenological Augmented Reality Lab, at University of Toronto, December 12, 2014

Kenneth Carless Smith (May 8, 1932 – October 29, 2023) was a Canadian electrical engineer and academic. He was a professor emeritus, University of Toronto, cross-appointed to the departments of electrical and computer engineering, mechanical and industrial engineering, computer science, and the faculty of information science. Smith died on October 29, 2023, at the age of 91.

On May 14, 2024, an event in memory of Smith was held in Toronto called "The Joy of Circuit Design: Honouring the Life and Memory of K.C. Smith". It included presentations by a variety of people related to Prof. Smith and featured his former graduate students: Prof. Adel Sedra and Bill Buxton.

Smith was affectionately called K.C. by his younger colleagues and also known as the "Pink Professor" for his penchant for wearing a pink hat, pink shirt, and pink accessories.

== Academic career ==
Smith received the Bachelor of Applied Science degree from the Division of Engineering Physics (now Division of Engineering Science) in 1954, the M.A.Sc. in electrical engineering in 1956, and the Ph.D. in physics in 1960, all from the University of Toronto.

From 1954 to 1955 he served with Canadian National Telegraphs as a transmission engineer. In 1956, Smith joined the Computation Centre, University of Toronto, as research engineer assigned to assist in the development of high-speed computers at the Digital Computer Laboratory, University of Illinois, Urbana. In 1960, he joined the faculty at the Department of Electrical Engineering at the University of Toronto as an assistant professor. In 1961 he returned the University of Illinois as an assistant professor of electrical engineering, where he became chief engineer of Illiac II, and of the Illiac III, and attained the rank of associate professor of computer science. In 1965 he returned to the University of Toronto, where he attained the rank of full professor. He served as chair of the Department of Electrical Engineering at the University of Toronto from 1976 to 1981.

Smith's publications are in the areas of electronic circuits, computer architecture,multiple-valued logic, instrumentation, sensors, machine vision, neural networks, computer music, human factors and human-computer interfaces, and databases.

Smith published over 150 scholarly papers. Smith is the co-author of Microelectronic Circuits (with A.S. Sedra). Two of his former graduate students are Adel S. Sedra and Bill Buxton. Smith and Sedra notably invented the current conveyor, a general circuit component similar to an operational amplifier. They also co-wrote the undergraduate microelectronics textbook Microelectronic Circuits, originally published in 1982 and now in its eighth edition (2020). The textbook has over one million copies in print as of June 1988.

Smith was appointed an advisory professor in communications at Shanghai Tiedao University, Shanghai, China in 1989. From 1993 to 1998, Smith was a visiting professor of electrical and electronic engineering at the Hong Kong University of Science and Technology, where he was founding director of its computer engineering department.

== Publications ==
Books

A. Sedra and K.C. Smith, Microelectronic Circuits, 6th ed. London, U.K.: Oxford Univ. Press, 2009.

K.C. Smith, KCs Problems and Solutions to Microelectronic Circuits, 4th ed. London, U.K.: Oxford Univ. Press, 1998.

K.C. Smith, Laboratory Explorations to Microelectronic Circuits, 4th ed. London, U.K.: Oxford Univ. Press, 1998.

Articles, selected

K.C. Smith, A. Sedra, The current conveyor—A new circuit building block, Proceedings of the IEEE, vol. 56, no. 8, pp. 1368–1369, August 1968.

A. Sedra, K.C. Smith, A second-generation current conveyor and its applications, IEEE Transactions on Circuit Theory, vol. 17, no. 1, pp. 132–134, February 1970.

Zvonko G. Vranesic, E. Stewart Lee, Kenneth C. Smith, A many-valued algebra for switching systems, IEEE Transactions on Computers, vol. 19, no. 10, pp. 964–971, October 1970.

E.A. Ozkarahan, S.A. Schuster, K.C. Smith, RAP—An associative processor for data base management, Proceedings of the National Computer Conference, pp. 379–387, May 1975.

W. Buxton, M.R. Lamb, D. Sherman, K.C. Smith, Towards a comprehensive user interface management system, Computer Graphics, vol. 17, no. 3, pp. 35–42, July 1983.

S.K. Lee, W. Buxton, K.C. Smith, A multi-touch three-dimensional touch-sensitive tablet, Proceedings of the 1985 Conference on Human Factors in Computer Systems, pp. 21–25, April 1985.

K.C. Smith, Multiple-valued logic: A tutorial and appreciation, Computer, vol. 21, no. 4, pp. 17–27, April 1988.

R. Safaee-Rad, I. Tchoukanov, K.C. Smith, B. Benhabib, Three-dimensional location estimation of circular features for machine vision, IEEE Transactions on Robotics and Automation, vol. 8, no. 5, pp. 624–640, October 1992.

== Service ==
Smith was the general chairman of the 1973 IEEE International Symposium for Circuits and Systems. He also contributed to the IEEE International Solid-State Circuits Conference as member of the program committee and member of the executive committee and awards chairman. He was also the chairman of the Publications Council of the Canadian Society of Electrical Engineering(CSEE), and a director of the Canadian Society for Professional Engineers (CSPE).

== Industry ==
Smith co-founded and was principal scientist at Z-Tech, a medical-instrumentation company that developed bio-impedance measurement devices for the detection of breast cancer.

== Awards and honors ==
Smith was elected fellow of the Institute of Electrical and Electronics Engineers (IEEE) in 1978 for "contributions to digital circuit design" and became a Life Fellow in 1996.

In 1984, he received the IEEE Computer Society Certificate of Appreciation "for contributions to multiple-valued circuit and device technology".

In 2009, he received the IEEE Canada Computer Medal for "lasting technical and educational contributions to electronics for computing".

An anonymous former student donated $75,000 to establish the Kenneth Carless Smith Engineering Science Research Fellowship, which is awarded yearly to a student or students in the Engineering Science program at the University of Toronto.

In 2011, he received the Lifetime Achievement Award from Information Technology Association of Canada (ITAC). He also received University of Toronto Faculty of Applied Science and Engineering Alumni Medal in 2011.

In 2012, the "Kenneth C. Smith Early Career Award for Microelectronics Research" was created by the International Symposium on Multiple-Valued Logic to honor Smith for his contribution to the field of multiple-valued logic.

In 2014, Kenneth C. Smith and Laura Fujino were presented with the Annual Creativity in Electronics (ACE) Award, selected by a panel of EDN and EE Times editors.

Other awards include:

- IEEE International Solid-State Circuits Service Award, 2000
- Special Issue of the Journal of Multiple-Valued Logic (MVL) and Soft Computing, in recognition of Smith's 70th year and 30 years of contributions to MVL, 2003
- IEEE Computer Society Service Award, 2004
