= Dimitris Metaxas =

American computer scientist

Dimitris N. Metaxas
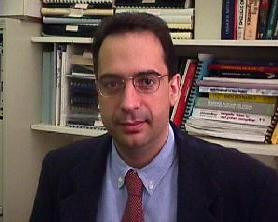
- Education: University of Toronto; University of Maryland; National Technical University of Athens
- Awards: NSF Career Award (1996); NSF Research Initiation Award (1993)
- Scientific career
- Fields: Computer Vision; Biomedical Image Analysis; Medical Image Computing; Data Science; Computer Graphics
- Workplaces: Rutgers University; University of Pennsylvania
- Thesis: Physics Based Modeling of Nonrigid Objects for Vision and Graphics (1992)
- Doctoral advisor: Demetri Terzopoulos
- Website: cbim.rutgers.edu

Dimitris Metaxas is a Greek American computer scientist who is a Board of Governors and Distinguished Professor of Computer Science Department at Rutgers University, where he directs the Center for Computational Biomedicine Imaging and Modeling (CBIM).

== Education ==
Metaxas did his undergraduate studies with highest honors in Electrical and Computer Engineering at the National Technical University of Athens. He was awarded an M.Sc. in Computer Science from the University of Maryland, College Park in 1988. He was awarded a PhD in 1992 from the University of Toronto under the supervision of Demetri Terzopoulos as part of the Dynamic Graphics Project.

== Career ==
Metaxas became an assistant professor in the Computer and Information Science Department at the University of Pennsylvania and director of the VAST Lab in 1992. From January 1998 to September 2001 he was a tenured associate professor in the same department, having received early tenure.

In September 2001, he moved to Rutgers as a professor in the Department of Computer Science at Rutgers University, where he founded and has since directed the Center for Computational Biomedicine, Imaging and Modeling (CBIM). Since July 2007, Metaxas is a professor II (distinguished professor). He served as Chair of the Department of Computer Science from 2013 to 2017. In June 2024, he was appointed Board of Governors Professor of Computer Science by the Rutgers University Board of Governors, the highest academic distinction at the university. He also serves as director of the NSF University-Industry Collaboration Center CARTA (Center for Accelerated Real Time Analytics).

== Research ==
In computer vision, Metaxas' work pioneered the simultaneous segmentation and fitting of complex objects, statistical model-based tracking, shape representation, learning, sparsity, ASL as well as gesture recognition. In particular, Metaxas is focusing on human body and shape motion analysis, human surveillance, security applications, ASL recognition, behavior modeling and analysis and scalable solutions to large and distributed sensor-based networks. In the area of biomedical applications, Metaxas has developed new methods for material modeling and shape estimation of internal body parts (such as the lungs) using data from MRI, SPAMM and CT scan.

Metaxas has pioneered the linking of the anatomical and physiological models of the human body and deformable models used for the automatic diagnosis of heart disease from MRI data. In computer graphics, Metaxas introduced the Navier-Stokes methodology for Fluids, based on which the water scenes in the movie Antz were created in 1998. For this work, his student Nick Foster won a Technical Achievement award from the Academy of Motion Picture Arts and Sciences in 1999. Since then, Metaxas is working on new techniques for modeling fluid phenomena, and control theoretic techniques for automating and improving the animation of articulated (e.g., humans) objects. Metaxas has published over 900 research articles. He has more than 67,000 citations.

== Awards and honors ==
Metaxas's research has been awarded by government agencies NSF, NIH, NASA, ONR, AFOSR, DARPA, HSARPA, and the ARO.

His work and that of his students have been recognized with numerous best paper awards, including Menglin Jiang and Shaoting Zhang's Best Paper at MICCAI 2015, Chaowei Tan's Best Student Paper at ISBI 2018, Anastasis Stathopoulos's Best Student Paper at FTC 2020, Zachary Daniels's Best Paper at DDDAS 2020, and Bingyu Xin and Meng Ye's first-place finish at the MICCAI CMRxRecon2024 Challenge.

He has served as the General Chair of CVPR 2014, 2026; the General Chair of ICCV 2011, 2031; the Program Chair of ICCV 2007; the General Chair of MICCAI 2008; and the Senior Program Chair for SCA 2007. He also served as General Chair of FIMH 2011, co-organizer of DDDAS 2024, and General Chair of IPMI 2025.

He is a long-standing member of the CVPR/ICCV Steering Committee.
