= Jonathan Rosenberg (mathematician) =

American mathematician (born 1951)

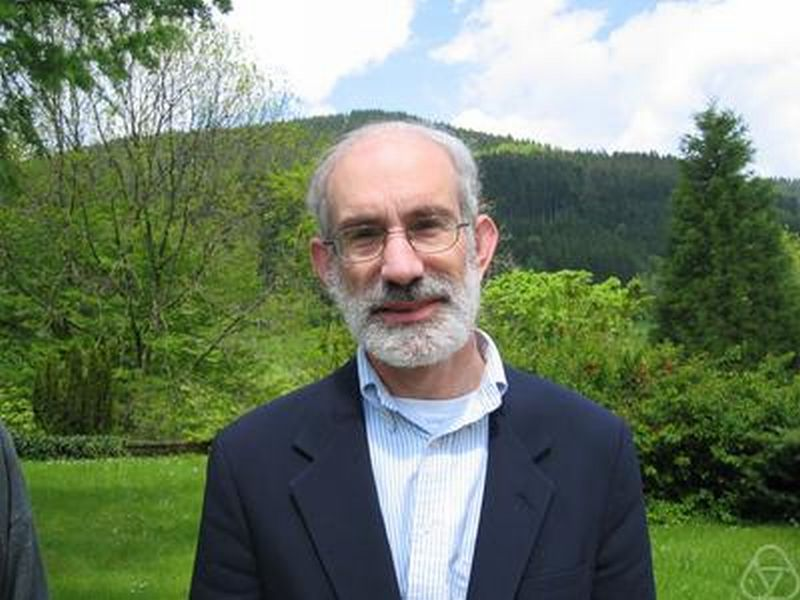
Jonathan Rosenberg, Oberwolfach 2005

Jonathan Micah Rosenberg (born December 30, 1951, in Chicago, Illinois) is an American mathematician, working in algebraic topology, operator algebras, K-theory and representation theory, with applications to string theory (especially dualities) in physics.

Rosenberg received his Ph.D. in 1976, under the supervision of Marc Rieffel, from the University of California, Berkeley (Group C*-algebras and square integrable representations). From 1977 to 1981 he was an assistant professor at the University of Pennsylvania. Since 1981, he has been at the University of Maryland at College Park where he is the Ruth M. Davis Professor of Mathematics. He is also a fellow of the American Mathematical Society (AMS).

He studies operator algebras and their relations with topology, geometry, with the unitary representation theory of Lie groups, K-theory and index theory. Along with H. Blaine Lawson and Mikhail Leonidovich Gromov, he is known for the Gromov–Lawson–Rosenberg conjecture.

Since 2015 he has been a managing editor of the Annals of K-Theory. During 2007–2015 he was an editor of the Journal of K-Theory. Before that, he was an associate editor of the Journal of the AMS (2000–2003), and of the Proceedings of the AMS (1988–1992). He was a Sloan Fellow from 1981 to 1984.

== Writings ==
- Rosenberg, Jonathan (1994). Algebraic K-Theory and Its Applications. Vol. 147. New York, NY: Springer New York. doi:10.1007/978-1-4612-4314-4. ISBN 978-1-4612-8735-3.
- Coombes, Kevin R.; Lipsman, Ronald L.; Rosenberg, Jonathan M. (1998). Multivariable Calculus and Mattiematica®. New York, NY: Springer New York. doi:10.1007/978-1-4612-1698-8. ISBN 978-0-387-98360-8.
- Topological and Bivariant K-Theory. Vol. 36. Basel: Birkhäuser Basel. 2007. doi:10.1007/978-3-7643-8399-2. ISBN 978-3-7643-8398-5.
- Superstrings, geometry, topology, and C*-algebras: NSF-CBMS Conference Topology, C*-algebras, and String Duality, May 18-22, 2009, Texas Christian University, Fort Worth, Texas. Providence, R.I: American Mathematical Society. 2010. ISBN 978-0-8218-4887-6.
- Rosenberg, Jonathan M.; Schochet, Claude (1986). The Künneth theorem and the universal coefficient theorem for equivariant K-theory and KK-theory. Providence, R.I., USA: American Mathematical Society. ISBN 0-8218-2349-3.
- Rosenberg, Jonathan; Schochet, Claude (1 June 1987). "The Künneth theorem and the universal coefficient theorem for Kasparov's generalized K-functor". Duke Mathematical Journal. 55 (2): 431–474. doi:10.1215/S0012-7094-87-05524-4. ISSN 0012-7094.
- Ferry, Steven C.; Ranicki, Andrew; Rosenberg, Jonathan M., eds. (23 November 1995). Novikov Conjectures, Index Theorems, and Rigidity: Oberwolfach 1993. Cambridge University Press. doi:10.1017/CBO9780511662676. ISBN 978-0-521-49796-1.
- Rosenberg, Jonathan (7 December 1983). "C * -algebras, positive scalar curvature, and the Novikov conjecture". Publications Mathématiques de l'IHÉS. 58: 197–212. doi:10.1007/BF02953775. ISSN 0073-8301.
- Surveys on surgery theory: papers dedicated to C.T.C. Wall. Princeton, N.J: Princeton University Press. 2000. ISBN 978-0-691-04938-0.
- Rosenberg, Jonathan (1991). "The KO-assembly map and positive scalar curvature". Algebraic Topology Poznań 1989. Lecture Notes in Mathematics. Vol. 1474. Berlin, Heidelberg: Springer Berlin Heidelberg. pp. 170–182. doi:10.1007/BFb0084745. ISBN 978-3-540-54098-4.
- Rosenberg, Jonathan; Stolz, Stephan (1995). The Čech Centennial: A Conference on Homotopy Theory. Vol. 181. Providence, Rhode Island: American Mathematical Society. arXiv:dg-ga/9407002. doi:10.1090/conm/181. ISBN 978-0-8218-0296-0.
- Gootman, Elliot C.; Rosenberg, Jonathan (1979). "The structure of crossed productC *-algebras: A proof of the generalized Effros-Hahn conjecture". Inventiones Mathematicae. 52 (3): 283–298. Bibcode:1979InMat..52..283G. doi:10.1007/BF01389885. ISSN 0020-9910.

== See also ==
- Twisted K-theory
