= Anita Layton =

American applied mathematician

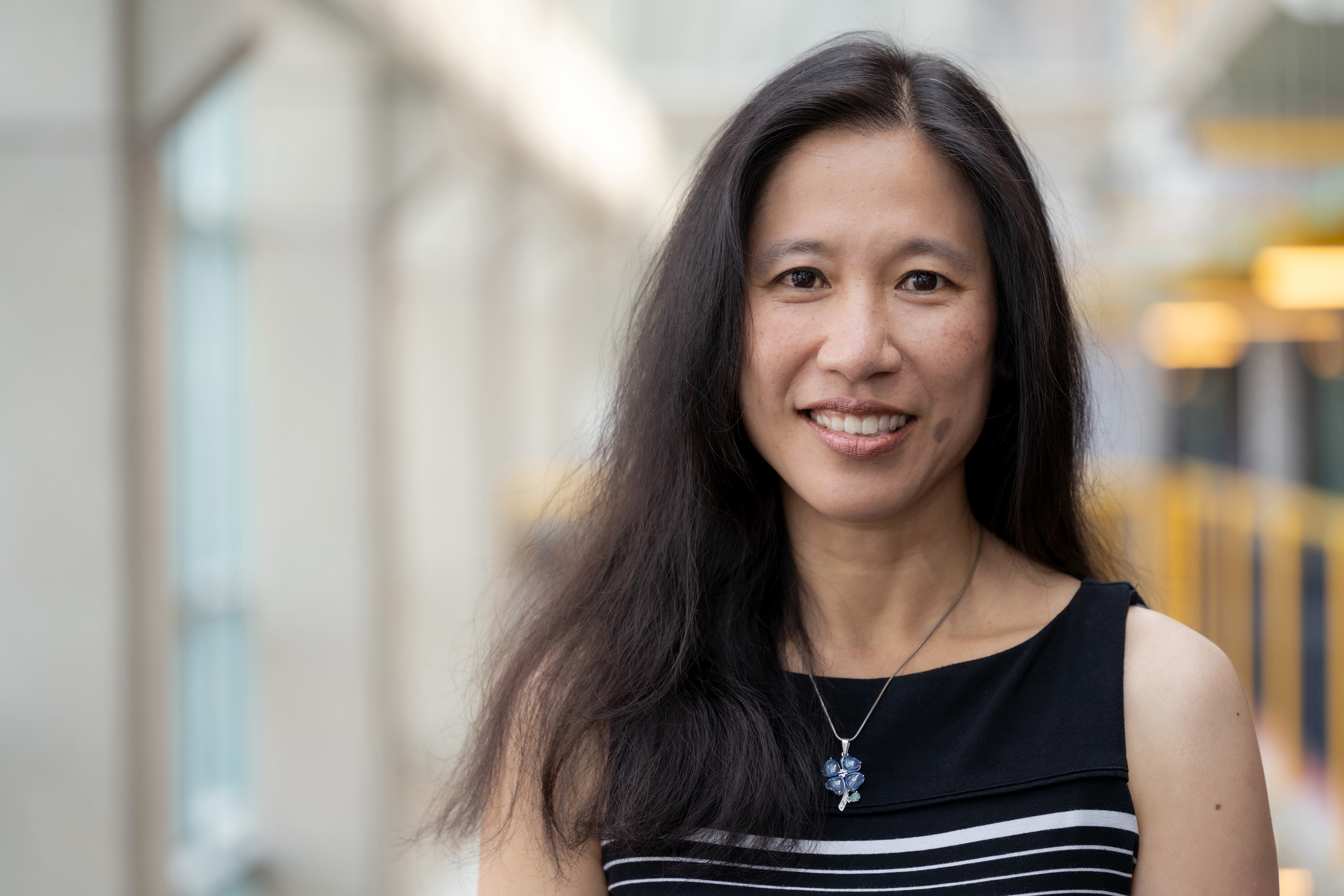
- Known for: Computational mathematics and partial differential equations to model kidney function

Anita T. Layton is an applied mathematician who applies methods from computational mathematics and partial differential equations to model kidney function. She presently holds a Canada 150 Research Chair in Mathematical Biology and Medicine at the University of Waterloo. She is also a professor in the university's Department of Applied Mathematics. She joined the Waterloo faculty in 2018. Previously, she was the Robert R. & Katherine B. Penn Professor of Mathematics at Duke University, where she also held appointments in the department of biomedical engineering and the department of medicine.

== Early life and education ==
Layton was born in Hong Kong, where her father was a secondary school mathematics teacher. She did her undergraduate studies at Duke, entering with the plan of studying physics but eventually switching to computer science and graduating in 1994. She went to the University of Toronto for her graduate studies, and completed a Ph.D. there in 2001. Her dissertation, High-Order Spatial Discretization Methods for the Shallow Water Equations, concerned numerical weather prediction, and was jointly supervised by Kenneth R. Jackson and Christina C. Christara.

== Research ==
Layton's main research interest is the application of mathematics to biological systems. She works with physiologists and clinicians to formulate detailed computational models of kidney function, which she uses to understand the impacts of diabetes and hypertension on kidney function, and the effectiveness of novel therapeutic treatments. With Aurélie Edwards, Layton is the author of Mathematical Modeling in Renal Physiology (Springer, Lecture Notes on Mathematical Modelling in the Life Sciences, 2014).

== Recognition ==
In 2018, Layton was awarded the Canada 150 Research Chair, and then joined the University of Waterloo, Department of Applied Mathematics. Layton is the 2021 winner of the Krieger–Nelson Prize of the Canadian Mathematical Society., a 2021 winner of the Top 100 Most Powerful Women in Canada by the Women’s Executive Network, a 2022 Fellow of the Association for Women in Mathematics, a 2022 Fellow of the Royal Society of Canada, the 2023 winner of the Award of Merit by the Federation of Chinese Canadian Professionals, the 2023 winner of the John L. Synge Award by the Royal Society of Canada, and the 2025 winner of the CAIMS*SCMAI Research Prize. Also in 2025 Layton was named a University Professor, a designation by the University of Waterloo that recognizes “exceptional scholarly achievement and international pre-eminence.”

== See also ==
- List of University of Waterloo people
