= Peter Constantin =

Romanian-American mathematician

- Born: August 29, 1951 (age 75); Cluj-Napoca, Romania
- Education: University of Bucharest; Hebrew University of Jerusalem
- Known for: Partial differential equations Fluid dynamics Navier–Stokes equations Onsager's conjecture
- Awards: Fellow of the American Academy of Arts and Sciences (2010); Member of the National Academy of Sciences (2021)
- Scientific career
- Fields: Mathematics
- Workplaces: Princeton University; University of Chicago
- Doctoral advisor: Shmuel Agmon
- Doctoral students: Mary Pugh

Peter S. Constantin (born 29 August 1951) is a Romanian-American mathematician known for his work on partial differential equations and fluid dynamics. His research focuses on mathematical aspects of hydrodynamics, including the Euler equations, the Navier–Stokes equations, and the theory of turbulence. He is the John von Neumann Professor of Mathematics and Applied and Computational Mathematics at Princeton University. He was elected to the National Academy of Sciences in 2021.

== Education and career ==
Constantin studied mathematics at the University of Bucharest, receiving his B.A. in 1974 and an M.A. summa cum laude in 1975. He later emigrated to Israel and received his Ph.D. from the Hebrew University of Jerusalem under the supervision of Shmuel Agmon. His doctoral dissertation was titled Spectral Properties of Schrödinger Operators in Domains with Infinite Boundaries.

In 1985 he joined the faculty of the University of Chicago as an assistant professor. He became professor of mathematics in 1988 and later held the titles of Louis Block Professor and Louis Block Distinguished Service Professor. From 2007 to 2011 he served as chair of the department of mathematics.

Constantin joined Princeton University in 2011 as the William R. Kenan Jr. Professor of Mathematics and Applied and Computational Mathematics and later became John von Neumann Professor.

== Research ==
Constantin’s research concerns nonlinear partial differential equations arising in fluid dynamics and mathematical physics. His work addresses turbulence theory, scaling laws in hydrodynamics, intermittency, turbulent transport, and the mathematical analysis of the Euler and Navier–Stokes equations.

He has contributed to the study of active scalar equations, nonlocal models in fluid mechanics, and problems related to the existence and regularity of solutions of fluid-dynamics equations. Constantin also introduced mathematical tools such as local smoothing estimates for dispersive equations and developed approaches to the analysis of generalized Lyapunov exponents and attractor dimensions for the Navier–Stokes equations.

In 1994, Constantin, together with Weinan E and Edriss Titi, proved that weak solutions of the Euler equations with Hölder regularity greater than one third conserve energy, establishing the energy-conservation side of Onsager's conjecture. The complementary part of the conjecture, concerning non-conservation below this regularity threshold, was proved by Philip Isett in 2018.

== Honors and awards ==
- He was an invited speaker at the International Congress of Mathematicians in 1994 in Zurich.
- He is a Fellow of the Society for Industrial and Applied Mathematics and an inaugural Fellow of the American Mathematical Society.
- He was elected to the American Academy of Arts and Sciences in 2010 and to the National Academy of Sciences in 2021.

== Selected publications ==
- Constantin, Peter; Foias, Ciprian; Temam, Roger; Nicolaenko, B. (1988). Integral manifolds and inertial manifolds for dissipative partial differential equations. Springer.
- Constantin, Peter; Foias, Ciprian (1988). Navier–Stokes Equations. University of Chicago Press.
- Constantin, Peter; Weinan E; Titi, Edriss S. (1994). "Onsager’s conjecture on the energy conservation for solutions of Euler’s equation". Communications in Mathematical Physics.
- Constantin, Peter (2007). "On the Euler Equations of Incompressible Flow". Bulletin of the American Mathematical Society.
