= Bahen Centre for Information Technology =

Building at the University of Toronto St. George

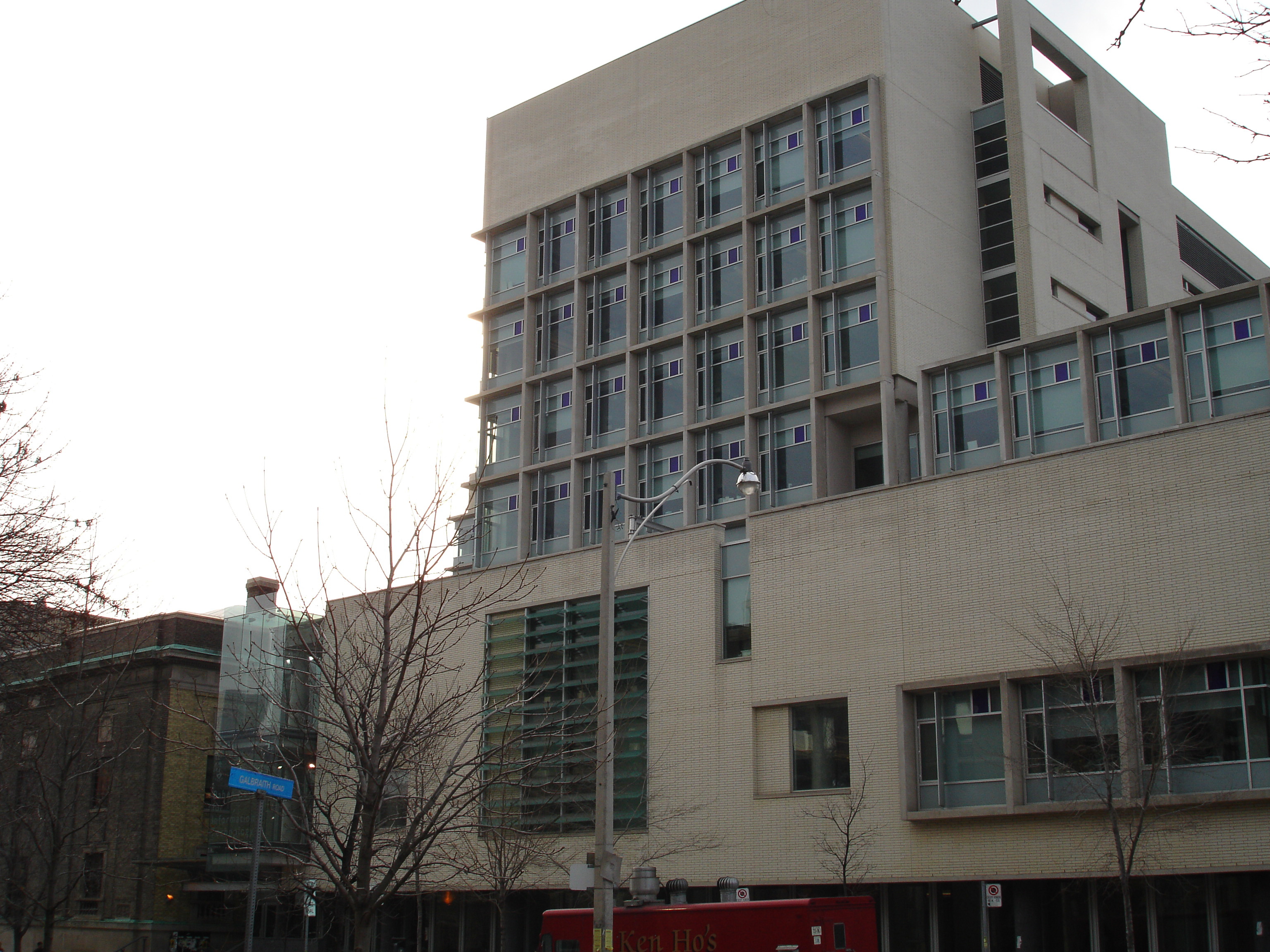
- View of the Bahen Centre from St. George Street

General information
- Location: 40 St. George St, Toronto, Ontario, Canada
- Coordinates: 43°39′34.5″N 79°23′50″W
- Opened: October 8, 2002; 24 years ago
- Cost: $111 million (CAD)
- Owner: University of Toronto

Technical details
- Floor count: 8
- Floor area: 20,000m^{2}

Design and construction
- Architect: Diamond Schmitt Architects

Other information
- Public transit: 506

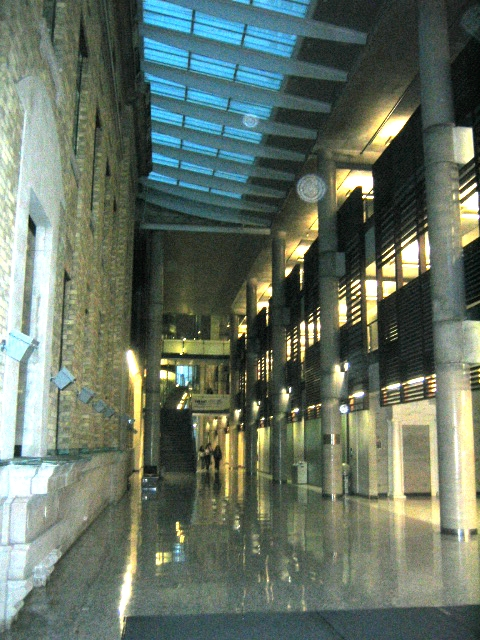
Bahen Centre lobby

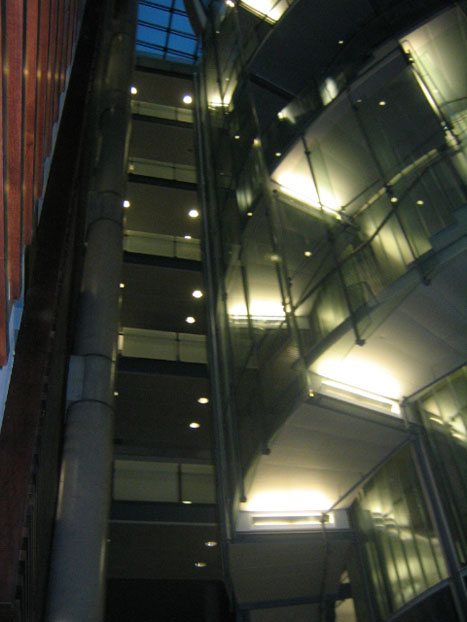
Looking up in the Bahen Centre

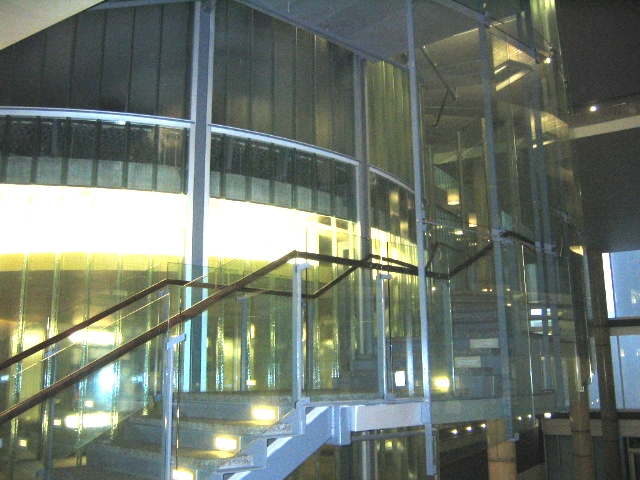
Building stairwell, third storey

The Bahen Centre for Information Technology is a building on the St. George campus of the University of Toronto. It is primarily used by the Faculty of Applied Science and Engineering, the Department of Computer Science and the Department of Mathematics.

The large 8-floor building contains 50 laboratories (including the Dynamic Graphics Project), 10 lecture theatres (including the large Adel Sedra Auditorium), 13 tutorial rooms, 9 seminar rooms, and about 300 offices. It is home to the Emerging Communications Technology Institute (formerly the Nortel Institute), the Bell University Laboratories and an Advanced Surface Coatings Laboratory.

== History ==
The Bahen Centre was constructed to meet the growing needs of the university's computer science and electrical and computer engineering programs, as the university doubled the size and funding of the programs. The building was named after engineer John Bahen, president of the Peter Kiewit and Sons building company, who was the leading donor to the C$108 million project. Jeffrey Skoll of eBay also donated $7 million.

The building was constructed at 40 St. George Street, immediately south of Russell Street, and wrapping around the Koffler Centre. This site had been home to several smaller structures, including the 1965 Boys and Girls House; the Toronto Public Library had operated a similar house on the site in some form from 1922 to 1995, originally under Lillian Smith.

One of the historic buildings was slated to be moved, but was instead incorporated into the design by the architects. Another building, the former Mendel Granatstein residence designed by Benjamin Brown, was demolished but its entrance portico was saved for display in the lobby of the new building.

The facilities were officially opened October 8, 2002, after opening in the summer of 2002. The sixth floor however was finished only in August 2005 and the Department of Mathematics moved in.

Designed by Diamond Schmitt Architects, the 20,000 gross square metre facility cost $111 million to build. The January 2003 issue of Canadian Architect magazine dubbed the Bahen Centre as "a complex interweaving of urbanity, public space and sustainability." It won the Ontario Association of Architects Award and City of Toronto Architecture and Urban Design Award, both in 2003. It also won a Bronze in the Environmental Category of the National Post Design Exchange Award.

== Sustainability ==
There are many elements of the Bahen Centre that contribute to the overall sustainability of the project. One of the biggest factors is the use of excess steam from the U of T steam plant to provide 92% of the total heating needs for the building. The Building also incorporates sun-shading devices along both the east and south side of the building reducing the amount of cooling needs during the summer months. Diamond Schmitt also used the program of the building to create the most efficient use of space and add to the sustainability of the building. Owing to the large numbers of computers used in the departments, labs were designed to face the coolest wall (north) to provide relief from the heat created by the computers. Incorporated into the building, a two-story storm management tank feeds all the water features within the courtyards. This includes the small waterfall which leads from the south of the building to College St. Despite the claims of sustainability, the center consumed site energy (electricity plus heat) of 625 kWh/m^{2} of energy in 2010–2011, compared to the average of new commercial buildings in the 300–350 range.

== Controversies ==
The Bahen Centre has been the site of three student suicides since mid-2018, with all three students committing suicide through jumping off a high unfenced and unguarded platform within the building. There has been numerous calls by both students and faculty for greater mental health awareness, and for more safety measures to be constructed within the building.

== Trivia ==
- The Bahen Centre lost the bid to host both the Wikimania 2006 and Wikimania 2009 conferences.
- An action scene of the series Flashpoint (season 4, episode 1) was shot in the central stairs from the 5th to the 7th floor of the building during the night of February 18, 2011.
- 40 St. George Street was once home to Boys and Girls House and a library branch (relocated to Lillian H. Smith Branch at 239 College Street). Original Second Empire-style home was built in 1922 was demolished in 1963 to make way for new Boys and Girls House and library (c. 1964)
- The Bahen Centre is home to the Engineering Science undergraduate common room and Electrical Engineering study hall, as well as the Computer Science Student Union.

== See also ==
- List of University of Toronto buildings
