= Dynamic Graphics Project =

Research laboratory at the University of Toronto

- Motto: The enhancement of human creativity through advances in human-computer interaction, user interface design, and interactive computer graphics.
- Established: 1967; 59 years ago
- Field of research: Computer Graphics, Human Computer Interaction, Computer Vision
- Location: 40 St. George Street, Toronto, Ontario, Canada
- Operating agency: Department of Computer Science (University of Toronto)
- Website: www.dgp.toronto.edu

The Dynamic Graphics Project (commonly referred to as DGP) is an interdisciplinary research laboratory at the University of Toronto's Department of Computer Science devoted to projects involving computer graphics, computer vision, human computer interaction, and visualization. The lab began as the computer graphics research group of computer science Professor Leslie Mezei in 1967. Mezei invited Bill Buxton, a pioneer of human–computer interaction (HCI) to join. In 1972, Ronald Baecker, another HCI pioneer joined, establishing DGP as the first Canadian university group focused on computer graphics and human-computer interaction. According to csrankings.org, the DGP is the top research institution in the world for the combined subfields of computer graphics, HCI, and visualization.

Since then, DGP has hosted many well known faculty and students in computer graphics, computer vision and HCI (e.g., Alain Fournier, Bill Reeves, Jos Stam, Demetri Terzopoulos, Marilyn Tremaine). DGP also occasionally hosts artists in residence (e.g., Oscar-winner Chris Landreth). Many past and current researchers at Autodesk (and before that Alias Wavefront) graduated after working at DGP. DGP is located in the St. George campus of University of Toronto in the Bahen Centre for Information Technology. DGP researchers regularly publish at ACM SIGGRAPH, ACM SIGCHI and ICCV.

DGP hosts the Toronto User Experience (TUX) Speaker Series and the Sanders Series Lectures.

== Notable alumni ==
- Bill Buxton (MS 1978)
- James McCrae (PhD 2013)
- Dimitris Metaxas (PhD 1992)
- Bill Reeves (MS 1976, Ph.D. 1980)
- Jos Stam (MS 1991, Ph.D. 1995)
