= Anne Broadbent =

Canadian mathematician

- Education: Université de Montréal
- Known for: quantum computing; quantum cryptography; quantum information
- Awards: 2010 John Charles Polanyi Prize in Physics; 2016 Aisenstadt Prize; 2026 John L. Synge Award
- Scientific career
- Fields: Mathematics
- Workplaces: University of Waterloo; University of Ottawa
- Thesis: Quantum nonlocality, cryptography and complexity (2008)
- Doctoral advisor: Alain Tapp; Gilles Brassard

Anne Lise Broadbent is a mathematician at the University of Ottawa who won the 2016 Aisenstadt Prize for her research in quantum computing, quantum cryptography, and quantum information. As of July 2024, she holds the Tier 1 Canada Research Chair in Quantum Communications and Cryptography.

== Early life and education ==
Broadbent specialised in music at De La Salle High School in Ottawa, graduating in 1997. Her interest in science led her to major in mathematics for her undergraduate degree.

Broadbent was a student of Alain Tapp and Gilles Brassard at the Université de Montréal, where she completed her master's in 2004 in the topic of Quantum pseudo-telepathy games, and her Ph.D. in 2008 with a dissertation on Quantum nonlocality, cryptography and complexity.

== Career ==
After postdoctoral studies at the Institute for Quantum Computing at the University of Waterloo, she moved to Ottawa in 2014. She is a Full Professor at the Department of Mathematics and Statistics of the University of Ottawa. From 2014 to 2024, she held the University of Ottawa University Research Chair in Quantum Information Processing.

== Awards ==
Broadbent is the winner of the 2010 John Charles Polanyi Prize in Physics of the Council of Ontario Universities. She was awarded the Aisenstadt Prize by International Scientific Advisory Committee of the Centre de Recherches Mathématiques in 2016 for her leadership and work in quantum information and cryptography. In 2026, she received the John L. Synge Award from the Royal Society of Canada.
