= Marc Rieffel =

American mathematician

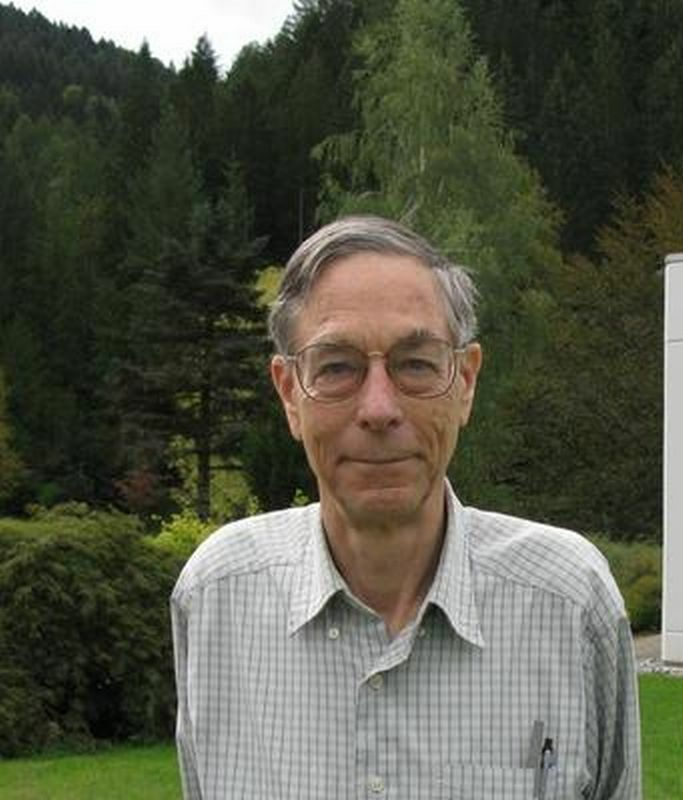
- Born: Marc Rieffel; December 22, 1937 (age 88); New York City, New York, U.S.
- Education: Columbia University
- Known for: Noncommutative torus
- Scientific career
- Fields: C*-algebras; Quantum group theory Noncommutative geometry
- Workplaces: University of California, Berkeley
- Doctoral advisor: Richard Kadison
- Doctoral students: Philip Green; Ian F. Putnam; Jonathan Rosenberg

Marc Aristide Rieffel is an American mathematician noted for his fundamental contributions to C*-algebra and quantum group theory. He is currently a professor in the department of mathematics at the University of California, Berkeley.

In 2012, he was selected as one of the inaugural fellows of the American Mathematical Society.

== Contributions ==
Rieffel earned his doctorate from Columbia University in 1963 under Richard Kadison with a dissertation entitled A Characterization of Commutative Group Algebras and Measure Algebras.

Rieffel introduced Morita equivalence as a fundamental notion in noncommutative geometry and as a tool for classifying C*-algebras. For example, in 1981 he showed that if A_{θ} denotes the noncommutative torus of angle θ, then A_{θ} and A_{η} are Morita equivalent if and only if θ and η lie in the same orbit of the action of SL(2, Z) on R by linear fractional transformations. More recently, Rieffel has introduced a noncommutative analogue of Gromov-Hausdorff convergence for compact metric spaces which is motivated by applications to string theory.
