= Mary Pugh =

American mathematician

Mary Claire Pugh is an applied mathematician known for her research on thin films, including the thin-film equation and Hele-Shaw flow. She is a professor of mathematics and chair and graduate chair of the Department of Mathematics at the University of Toronto, and was awarded the Faculty of Arts and Science's Outstanding Teaching Award in 2025.

Pugh obtained her BA in mathematics at the University of California, Berkeley and completed her Ph.D. in 1993 at the University of Chicago. Her dissertation, Dynamics of Interfaces of Incompressible Fluids: The Hele-Shaw Problem, was supervised by Peter Constantin. Before moving to Toronto, she worked at the Courant Institute of Mathematical Sciences at New York University and then as a faculty member at the University of Pennsylvania, where she won a Sloan Research Fellowship in 1999.
