= Michael Loss =

American mathematician (b. 1954)

Michael Loss (born 1954) is a mathematician and mathematical physicist who works as a professor of mathematics at the Georgia Institute of Technology.

Loss obtained his Ph.D. in 1982 from the ETH Zurich, with a dissertation on the three-body problem jointly supervised by Walter Hunziker and Israel Michael Sigal.

He coauthors the graduate textbook Analysis (Graduate Studies in Mathematics 14. American Mathematical Society, 1997; 2nd ed., 2001) with Elliott H. Lieb.

In 2012, he became one of the inaugural fellows of the American Mathematical Society, and was elected as a Foreign Corresponding Member of the Chilean Academy of Sciences. He is one of the 2015 winners of the Humboldt Prize.
