= Ronald Baecker =

American computer scientist (born 1942)

- Born: October 7, 1942 (age 83); Kenosha, Wisconsin
- Education: MIT
- Scientific career
- Fields: Computer science
- Workplaces: University of Toronto; Columbia University

Ronald Baecker (born October 7, 1942) is an Emeritus Professor of Computer science and Bell Chair in Human-Computer Interaction at the University of Toronto (U of T), and Adjunct Professor of Computer Science at Columbia University. An American-born computer scientist, he is a prominent figure in Canadian human–computer interaction, computer graphics, and interactive media research.

He co-founded the Dynamic Graphics Project (DGP) a University of Toronto laboratory researching computer graphics, human–computer interaction, visualization, and computer vision, which he joined in 1972. He founded the Knowledge Media Design Institute (KMDI) in 1996, an interdisciplinary institute studying digital media, knowledge technologies, and human interaction with information systems, and later founded the Technologies for Aging Gracefully Lab (TAGlab) which designs technology to support older adults' independence, health, and social connectivity.

He created Canada's five-year research network on collaboration technologies (NECTAR) and was a founding researcher of AGE-WELL, Canada's national research network on technologies for older adults and caregivers. He also founded Springer Nature's Synthesis Lectures on Technology and Health.

Most recently, he has led a project modeling extreme weather disasters to compare plausible futures under inaction versus constructive climate action. He has also started five software companies between 1976 and 2015.

His earlier edited collections Readings in Human Computer Interaction Toward the Year 2000 (1995), Readings in Groupware and Computer Supported Cooperative Work (1993), Human Factors and Typography for More Readable Programs (1990), and Readings in Human Computer Interaction A Multidisciplinary Approach.

== Education ==
Baecker received a B.Sc. in physics from Massachusetts Institute of Technology (MIT) in 1963, an M.Sc. in electrical engineering from MIT in 1964, and a Ph.D. in computer science from MIT in 1969.

His doctoral research at MIT focused on interactive computer-mediated animation. His dissertation explored techniques for creating animated computer graphics through interactive systems. He developed the Genesys animation system, a computer animation environment that demonstrated how animators could work creatively with computers using tablets and interactive displays.

== Academic career ==
Baecker joined the University of Toronto in 1972 as an assistant professor in the Department of Computer Science. He became co-director of the Dynamic Graphics Project, helping to build it into one of the leading research centers for human–computer interaction and computer graphics. He later served as Associate Professor and was cross-appointed to the Department of Electrical and Computer Engineering in 1975, before being promoted to full Professor in 1989. From 2002 to 2011 he held the Bell University Laboratories Chair in Human-Computer Interaction.

Throughout his academic career, Baecker developed a number of pioneering university courses in areas such as human–computer interaction, interactive computer graphics, computer-supported cooperative work, and software entrepreneurship. His “Business of Software” course, first introduced in 1986, trained thousands of students in the principles of technology entrepreneurship and innovation.

He also helped establish one of the first undergraduate specializations in human–computer interaction within a computer science program.

== Summary of research interests ==
Baecker is an expert in human-computer interaction (HCI), user interface (UI) design, software visualization, multimedia, computer-supported cooperative work and learning, entrepreneurship in the software industry, and the design of technologies for aging gracefully.

Much of his research has focused on improving the ways in which people interact with computing systems by designing intuitive interfaces and visual representations of complex information. He has contributed to research areas including software visualization, collaborative writing systems, multimedia learning environments and interactive animation.

Baecker’s work also contributed to early research in computer-supported cooperative work (CSCW) and computer-supported collaborative learning (CSCL), which examine how digital technologies can support teamwork, communication, and knowledge sharing among distributed groups.

His research increasingly focused on the societal impacts of computing technologies, including ethical technology development, digital governance, and the social consequences of artificial intelligence and online platforms.

== Honors and awards ==
- ACM Distinguished Speaker, 1 March 2022 - 28 February 2025.
- Social Impact Award from the ACM Special Interest Group on Computers and Human Interaction (SIGCHI), 2020.
- Lifetime Achievement Award from the Canadian Association of Computer Science/Association d’informatique Canadienne, the national organization of Canadian Computer Science Departments/Schools/Faculties, May 2015.
- Given the 3rd Canadian Digital Media Pioneer Award, GRAND Network of Centres of Excellence, May 2013.
- Elected as an ACM Fellow, November 2011.
- Second-place recipient, University of Toronto Inventor of the Year Award, Information and Computer Technology, January 2011.
- Awarded the 2007 Leadership Award of Merit from the Ontario Research and Innovation Optical Network (ORION) in June 2007.
- Awarded the Canadian Human Computer Communications Society Achievement Award in May 2005.
- Elected to the ACM SIGCHI CHI Academy in February 2005.
- Named one of the 60 Pioneers of Computer Graphics by ACM SIGGRAPH in 1998.
