= Eckhard Meinrenken =

Canadian mathematician

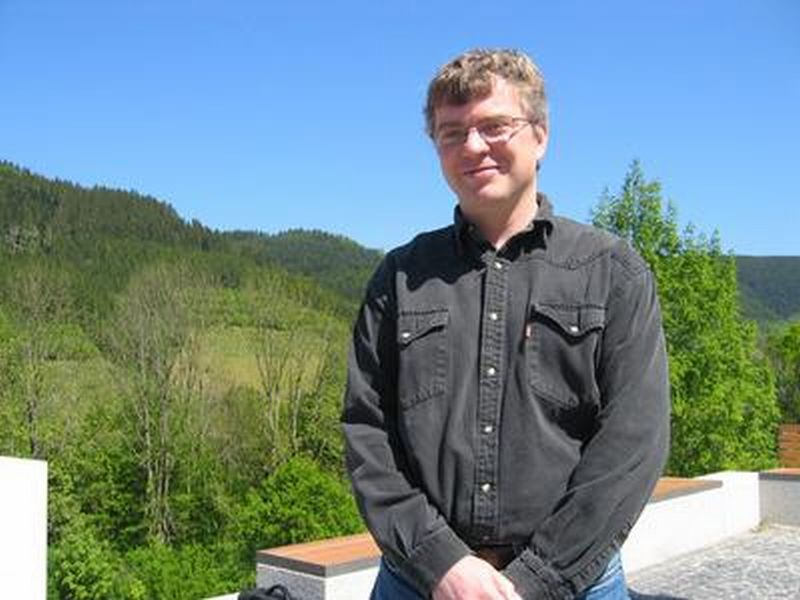
- Meinrenken in 2007
- Education: Albert-Ludwigs-Universität Freiburg
- Awards: Aisenstadt Prize, 2001; Fellow of the Royal Society of Canada, 2008
- Scientific career
- Fields: Mathematics
- Workplaces: University of Toronto
- Thesis: Vielfachheitsformeln für die Quantisierung von Phasenräumen (1994)
- Doctoral advisor: Hartmann Roemer
- Website: https://www.math.toronto.edu/mein/

Eckhard Meinrenken FRSC is a German-Canadian mathematician working in differential geometry and mathematical physics. He is a professor at University of Toronto.

== Education and career ==
Meinrenken studied Physics at Albert-Ludwigs-Universität Freiburg, where he obtained a Diplom in 1990 and a PhD in 1994, with a thesis entitled Vielfachheitsformeln für die Quantisierung von Phasenräumen (Multiplicity formulas for the quantization of phase spaces), under the supervision of Hartmann Römer.

He was a postdoc at Massachusetts Institute of Technology from 1995 to 1997, and then he joined University of Toronto Department of Mathematics in 1998 as assistant professor. In 2000 he became an associate professor, and since 2004 he is full professor at the same university.

Meinrenken was awarded in 2001 an André Aisenstadt Prize, in 2003 a McLean Award and in 2007 a NSERC Steacie Memorial Fellowship.

In 2002 he was invited speaker at the International Congress of Mathematicians in Beijing and in 2008 he was elected Fellow of the Royal Society of Canada.

== Research ==
Meinrenken's research interests lie in the fields of differential geometry and mathematical physics. In particular, he works on symplectic geometry, Lie theory and Poisson geometry.

Among his most important contributions, in 1998 he proved, together with Reyer Sjamaar the conjecture "quantisation commutes with reduction", originally formulated in 1982 by Guillemin and Sternberg. In the same year, together with Anton Alekseev and Anton Malkin, he introduced Lie group-valued moment maps in symplectic geometry.

Meinrenken is author of more than 50 research papers in peer-reviewed journals, as well as a monograph on Clifford algebras. He has supervised 9 PhD students as of 2021.
