= Anton Alekseev (mathematician) =

Russian mathematician

Anton Yurevich Alekseev (Антон Юрьевич Алексеев, born 9 August 1967) is a Russian mathematician.

Alekseev was a student of Ludvig Faddeev. Alekseev worked at the Steklov Institute in Saint Petersburg and, at the beginning of the 1990s, at Uppsala University, Sweden. He is now a professor ordinarius at the University of Geneva.

Alekseev does research on representation theory of Lie groups and algebras, moment theory, symplectic geometry and mathematical physics.

In 2006 he, with Eckhard Meinrenken, published in Inventiones Mathematicae a proof of the Kashiwara-Vergne conjecture. In 2008 he gave a new proof with fr:Charles Torossian.

In 2014 Alekseev was an invited speaker with talk Three lives of the Gelfand-Zeitlin integrable system at the International Congress of Mathematicians in Seoul.

In 2020 Alekseev received the Medal of the Erwin Schrödinger International Institute for Mathematics and Physics.

== Selected publications ==
- as editor with A. Hietamäki, K. Huitu, A. Morozov, Antti Juhani Niemi: Integrable Models and Strings, Proceedings of the 3rd Baltic Rim Student Seminar Held at Helsinki, Finland, 13.–17. September 1993, Springer, Lecture Notes in Physics, 1994; abstract doi:10.1007/3-540-58453-6
  - within the Proceedings by Anton Alekseev and A. Malkin: Symplectic geometry and the Chern-Simons theory, pp. 59–97 preprint
- with Eckhard Meinrenken: The non commutative Weil Algebra, Inventiones Mathematicae, vol. 139, 2000, pp. 135–172, Arxiv
- with Eckhard Meinrenken: Poisson geometry and the Kashiwara-Vergne conjecture, C. R. Acad. Sci., 335, 2003, pp. 723–728, Arxiv
- with Eckhard Meinrenken: Clifford algebras and the classical dynamical Yang-Baxter-Equations, Math.Res.Lett., vol. 10, 2003, pp. 253–268, Arxiv
- with Eckhard Meinrenken: On the Kashiwara-Vergne conjecture, Inventiones Mathematicae 164, 2006, 615–634, Arxiv
- with Carlo A. Rossi, Charles Torossian, Thomas Willwacher: Logarithms and Deformation Quantization, Inventiones Mathematicae, vol. 206, 2016, pp. 1–26, Arxiv
- with C. Torossian: The Kashiwara-Vergne Conjecture and Drinfeld's associators, Annals of Mathematics, vol. 175, 2012, pp. 415–463, Arxiv
- with C. Torossian: On triviality of the Kashiwara-Vergne problem for quadratic Lie algebras, C. R. Math. Acad. Sci. Paris, vol. 347, 2009, pp. 21–22, 1231–1236. Arxiv
- with C. Torossian: Kontsevich deformation quantization and flat connections, Comm. Math. Phys., vol. 300, 2010, pp. 47–64, Arxiv
- with B. Enriquez, C. Torossian: Drinfeld associators, braid groups and explicit solutions of the Kashiwara-Vergne equations, Publ. Math. Inst. Hautes Études Sci., Band 112, 2010, S. 143–189, Arxiv
- with Arkady Berenstein, Benjamin Hoffman, Yanpeng Li: Langlands Duality and Poisson-Lie Duality via Cluster Theory and Tropicalization, Arxiv 2018
