= Philip Palmer Green =

- Education: Berkeley
- Known for: Developing important algorithms and procedures used in gene mapping and DNA sequencing
- Awards: Gairdner Award
- Scientific career
- Fields: Theoretical and computational biology
- Thesis: C*-algebra (1976)
- Doctoral advisor: Marc Rieffel

Philip Palmer Green is a theoretical and computational biologist noted for developing important algorithms and procedures used in gene mapping and DNA sequencing. He earned his doctorate from Berkeley in mathematics in 1976 with a dissertation on C*-algebra under the direction of Marc Rieffel, but transitioned from pure mathematics into applied work in biology and bioinformatics. Green has obtained numerous important results, including in developing Phred, a widely used DNA trace analyzer, in mapping techniques, and in genetic analysis. Green was elected to the National Academy of Sciences in 2001 and won the Gairdner Award in 2002.

== See also ==
- Phred base calling
