= Bálint Virág =

Hungarian mathematician

Bálint Virág FRSC (born 1973) is a Hungarian mathematician working in Canada, known for his work in probability theory, particularly determinantal processes, random matrix theory, and random walks and other probabilistic questions on groups. He received his Ph.D. from U.C. Berkeley in 2000, under the direction of Yuval Peres, and was a post-doc at MIT. Since 2003 he has been a Canada research chair at the University of Toronto.

Virág was awarded a Sloan Fellowship (2004), the Rollo Davidson Prize (2008), the Coxeter–James Prize (2010), and the John L. Synge Award (2014). He was an invited speaker at the International Congress of Mathematicians in 2014. In 2024, he was named a Fellow of the Royal Society of Canada.
