= Israel Halperin Prize =

The Israel Halperin Prize is awarded every five years by the Canadian Annual Symposium on Operator Theory and Operator Algebras to a member of the Canadian mathematical community who has recently obtained a doctorate and has made contributions to operator theory or operator algebras. It honors Israel Halperin, the founder of a group of researchers in operator algebras and operator theory at the University of Toronto who strongly influenced the field across Canada. First awarded in 1980.

== Recipients ==
The recipients of the award are:

- 1980: Man-Duen Choi
- 1985: Kenneth R. Davidson, David Handelman
- 1990: Ian F. Putnam
- 1995: Nigel Higson
- 2000: Guihua Gong, Alexandru Nica
- 2010: Andrew Toms
- 2015: Serban Belinschi, Zhuang Niu
- 2020: Matthew Kennedy, Aaron Tikuisis
- 2025: Michael Hartz, Christopher Schafhauser

== See also ==
- List of mathematics awards
