= John L. Synge Award =

John L. Synge Award is an award by the Royal Society of Canada for outstanding research in any branch of the mathematical sciences. It was created in 1986 and is given at irregular intervals. The award is named in honor of John Lighton Synge.

== Winners ==
Source: Royal Society of Canada

- 2026 – Anne Broadbent
- 2025 – Ben Adcock
- 2024 – Jacob Tsimerman FRS
- 2023 – Anita Layton FRSC
- 2022 – Kevin Costello FRS
- 2021 – Paul McNicholas FRSC
- 2020 – Christian Genest FRSC
- 2018 – Bojan Mohar FRSC
- 2014 – Bálint Virág FRSC
- 2008 – Henri Darmon FRSC
- 2006 – Stephen Cook FRSC
- 1999 – George A. Elliott FRSC
- 1996 – Joel Feldman FRSC
- 1993 – Israel Michael Sigal FRSC
- 1987 – James G. Arthur CC FRSC FRS

== See also ==
- List of mathematics awards
- Laureates 2020
