= Ian F. Putnam =

Mathematician

- Education: University of California, Berkeley
- Awards: Israel Halperin Prize (1990); Aisenstadt Prize (1993)
- Scientific career
- Fields: Dynamical systems theory
- Workplaces: University of Victoria
- Thesis: The C*-algebras Associated with Denjoy Homeomorphisms (1985)
- Doctoral advisor: Marc Rieffel
- Website: web.uvic.ca/~ifputnam/

Ian Fraser Putnam is a mathematician whose research focus on the intersection between dynamical systems and algebra, including C*-algebras and K-theory. He is a professor at the University of Victoria.

== Education ==
He obtained his PhD at the University of California, Berkeley in 1985, with Marc Aristide Rieffel as advisor (thesis The C*-algebras Associated with Denjoy Homeomorphisms).

== Honours ==
- Israel Halperin Prize in 1990.
- Aisenstadt Prize in 1993.
- Fellow of the Royal Society of Canada.
- Fellow of the American Mathematical Society since 2013 (inaugural class).

== Selected publications ==
- GIORDANO, Thierry; PUTNAM, Ian F.; SKAU, Christian F. "Topological orbit equivalence and C*-crossed products". 1995.
- ANDERSON, Jared E.; PUTNAM, Ian F. "Topological invariants for substitution tilings and their associated-algebras". Ergodic Theory and Dynamical Systems, v. 18, n. 3, p. 509–537, 1998.
- HERMAN, Richard H.; PUTNAM, Ian F.; SKAU, Christian F. "Ordered Bratteli diagrams, dimension groups and topological dynamics". International Journal of Mathematics, v. 3, n. 06, p. 827–864, 1992.
- Putnam, Ian F. (2018). Cantor Minimal Systems. American Mathematical Soc. ISBN 978-1-4704-4115-9.
