= Nigel Higson =

Canadian mathematician (born 1963)

Nigel David Higson (born 1963) is a Canadian math professor at Pennsylvania State University who received the 1995 Israel Halperin Prize and the 1996 Coxeter–James Prize. His doctorate came from Dalhousie University in 1985, under the supervision of Peter Fillmore. He works in the fields of operator algebra and K-theory. In 1998 he was an Invited Speaker of the International Congress of Mathematicians in Berlin. In 2012 he was chosen as one of the inaugural Fellows of the American Mathematical Society.

== Books ==
- Analytic K-Homology Oxford University Press, 2000 with John Roe
- Surveys in Noncommutative Geometry, 2000 with John Roe
