= Alexander Nabutovsky =

Canadian mathematician

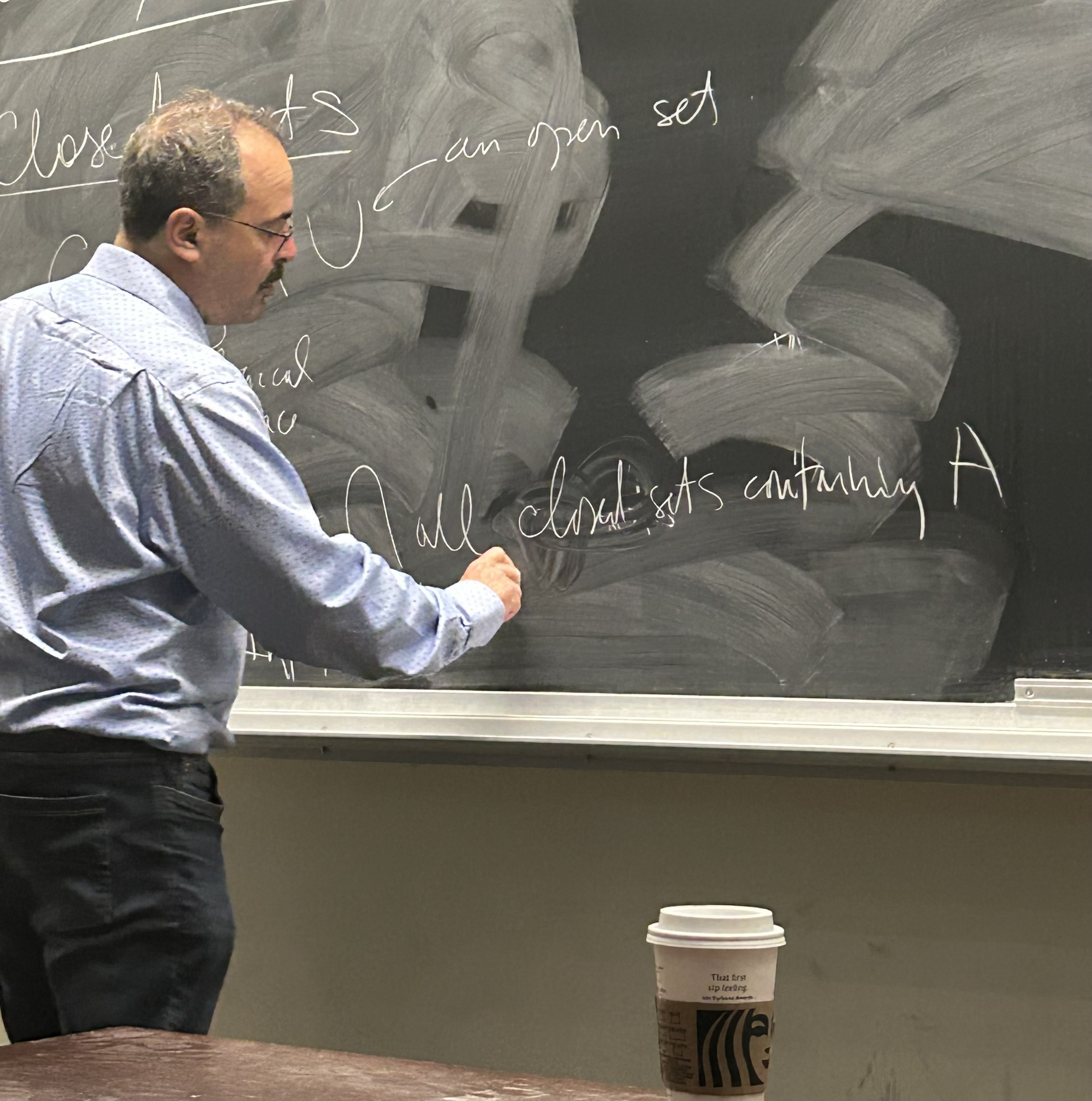
- Nabutovsky lecturing at the University of Toronto, September 2025.
- Born: Novosibirsk, Russia
- Education: Weizmann Institute of Science
- Scientific career
- Fields: Mathematics
- Workplaces: University of Toronto
- Doctoral advisor: Shmuel Kiro
- Doctoral students: Yevgeny Liokumovich
- Website: https://www.math.utoronto.ca/nabutovsky/

Alexander Nabutovsky is a Canadian mathematician specializing in differential geometry, geometric calculus of variations and quantitative aspects of topology of manifolds. He is a professor at the University of Toronto Department of Mathematics.

Nabutovsky earned a Ph.D. degree from the Weizmann Institute of Science in 1993; his advisor was Shmuel Kiro. His doctoral dissertation was Geometry Of Spaces Of Objects With Complexity: Algebraic Hypersurfaces, Knots With Thick Rope And Semi-Linear Elliptic Boundary Value Problems.

He was an invited speaker on "Geometry" at International Congress of Mathematicians, 2010 in Hyderabad.

Yevgeny Liokumovich was a PhD student of his.
