= Weyl law =

Description in spectral theory

In mathematics, especially spectral theory, Weyl's law describes the asymptotic behavior of eigenvalues of the Laplace–Beltrami operator. This description was discovered in 1911 (in the $d=2,3$ case) by Hermann Weyl for eigenvalues for the Laplace–Beltrami operator acting on functions that vanish at the boundary of a bounded domain $\Omega \subset \mathbb{R}^d$. In particular, he proved that the number, $N(\lambda)$, of Dirichlet eigenvalues (counting their multiplicities) less than or equal to $\lambda$ satisfies

$$\lim_{\lambda \rightarrow \infty} \frac{N(\lambda)}{\lambda^{d/2}} = (2\pi)^{-d} \omega_d \mathrm{vol}(\Omega)$$

where $\omega_d$ is a volume of the unit ball in $\mathbb{R}^d$. In 1912 he provided a new proof based on variational methods. Weyl's law can be extended to closed Riemannian manifolds, where another proof can be given using the Minakshisundaram–Pleijel zeta function.

== Generalizations ==
The Weyl law has been extended to more general domains and operators. For the Schrödinger operator

$$H=-h^2 \Delta + V(x)$$

it was extended to

$$N(E,h)\sim (2\pi h)^{-d}  \int _{\{ |\xi|^2 + V(x)<E \}} dx\, d\xi$$

as $E$ tending to $+\infty$ or to a bottom of essential spectrum and/or $h\to +0$. Here $N(E,h)$ is the number of eigenvalues of $H$ below $E$ unless there is essential spectrum below $E$ in which case $N(E,h)=+\infty$.

In the development of spectral asymptotics, the crucial role was played by variational methods and microlocal analysis.

== Counter-examples ==
The extended Weyl law fails in certain situations. In particular, the extended Weyl law "claims" that there is no essential spectrum if and only if the right-hand expression is finite for all $E$.

If one considers domains with cusps (i.e. "shrinking exits to infinity") then the (extended) Weyl law claims that there is no essential spectrum if and only if the volume is finite. However for the Dirichlet Laplacian there is no essential spectrum even if the volume is infinite as long as cusps shrinks at infinity (so the finiteness of the volume is not necessary).

On the other hand, for the Neumann Laplacian there is an essential spectrum unless cusps shrinks at infinity faster than the negative exponent (so the finiteness of the volume is not sufficient).

== Weyl conjecture ==
Weyl conjectured that

$$N(\lambda)= (2\pi)^{-d}\lambda ^{d/2} \omega_d \mathrm{vol} (\Omega)\mp \frac{1}{4} (2\pi)^{1-d}\omega_{d - 1}\lambda ^{(d-1)/2}\mathrm{area} (\partial \Omega) +o (\lambda ^{(d-1)/2})$$

where the remainder term is negative for Dirichlet boundary conditions and positive for Neumann. The remainder estimate was improved upon by many mathematicians.

In 1922, Richard Courant proved a bound of $O(\lambda^{(d-1)/2}\log \lambda)$. In 1952, Boris Levitan proved the tighter bound of $O(\lambda^{(d-1)/2})$ for compact closed manifolds. Robert Seeley extended this to include certain Euclidean domains in 1978. In 1975, Hans Duistermaat and Victor Guillemin proved the bound of $o(\lambda ^{(d-1)/2})$ when the set of periodic bicharacteristics has measure 0. This was finally generalized by Victor Ivrii in 1980. This generalization assumes that the set of periodic trajectories of a billiard in $\Omega$ has measure 0, which Ivrii conjectured is fulfilled for all bounded Euclidean domains with smooth boundaries. Since then, similar results have been obtained for wider classes of operators.

== Uses in black body radiation ==
In a cubed hollow cavity with length size $L$ and volume $V=L^3$ the density of states of the electromagnetic radiation with angular frequency $\omega$ is given by

$$g(\omega)=\frac{V\omega^2}{\pi^2c^3}$$

where $c$ is the speed of light. Weyl's law can be used to show that this density of states applies to cavities of any shape if they are sufficiently large.
