= Adel Sedra =

Egyptian-Canadian electrical engineer (born 1943)

Adel S. Sedra
- عادل سدرة

Dean of the University of Waterloo Faculty of Engineering
- In office July 1, 2003 – June 2012

8th Vice-President and Provost of the University of Toronto
- In office July 1, 1993 – 2002
- President: Robert Prichard; Robert J. Birgeneau
- Preceded by: Joan Foley
- Succeeded by: Shirley Neuman

Personal details
- Born: 2 November 1943 (age 82) Egypt
- Education: Cairo University; University of Toronto
- Scientific career
- Occupation: Professor of electrical engineering
- Known for: Microelectronics
- Title: Distinguished Professor Emeritus, University of Waterloo
- Children: 2
- Doctoral advisor: Kenneth C. Smith

Adel S. Sedra (Arabic: عادل سدرة; born 2 November 1943) OC OOnt is an Egyptian-Canadian electrical engineer and professor, specialising in microelectronics. He has held leadership positions at the University of Toronto and the University of Waterloo.

== Career ==
Sedra received his B.Sc. from Cairo University in 1964 and his M.A.Sc. and Ph.D. from the University of Toronto, in 1968 and 1969, respectively. All three of his degrees are in electrical engineering.

Sedra joined the faculty of the University of Toronto in 1969 and became associate professor in 1972 and professor in 1978. He served as chair of the Department of Electrical Engineering from 1986 to 1993, and was vice president, provost, and chief academic officer from July 1, 1993, to 2002. In his nine years as provost Sedra led the university through two major long-range planning cycles in 1994 and 1998.

On July 1, 2003, Sedra joined the University of Waterloo as dean of its Faculty of Engineering and as professor of electrical and computer engineering. In 2004 he initiated the University of Waterloo Engineering Planning Exercise, VISION 2010. He served as Dean of Engineering until June 2012.

A specialist in microelectronics, Sedra's research focuses on applications in communication and instrumentation systems, including theory and design of circuits. Sedra has co-authored three textbooks, including Microelectronic Circuits (with co-author K.C. Smith), now in its eighth edition (2019). The text is published in ten languages, has over one million copies in print, and is one of the most widely used texts on the subject to date. He is co-author with Gordon W. Roberts of the text book SPICE for Microelectronic Circuits published in 1995. His first text book (with co-author Peter O. Brackett) titled Filter Theory and Design: Active and Passive was published in 1978.

Sedra has published about 150 scholarly papers, has guided the research of about 65 graduate students, and has also served as a consultant to industry and governments in Canada and the United States.

Sedra was a founding member and a member of the board of directors of the Information Technology Research Centre, a designated centre-of-excellence funded by the Government of Ontario (now the Centre of Excellence for Communications and Information Technology, one of the Ontario Centres of Excellence). From 1990 to 1994, Sedra was a member of the Scientific Assessment Panel for the Industry Research Program of Technology Ontario, and is currently a member of the Research Council of the Canadian Institute for Advanced Research. Sedra served as a delegate to Oxford University Press (1995–2008) and is currently editing the Oxford Electrical and Computer Engineering Series. More recently, Sedra chaired a committee that reviewed the Structure of NSERC Grant Selection Committees.

== Awards and honours ==
Sedra is the recipient of several honorary degrees, including a Doctor of Laws degree from the University of Toronto (2005), Doctor of Science degrees from Queen's University (2003) and McGill University (2007), and a Doctor of Engineering degree from Ryerson University (2015)

Sedra was elected fellow of the Institute of Electrical and Electronics Engineers (1984), the Canadian Academy of Engineering (1999), and the Royal Society of Canada (2003).

Sedra is the recipient of several awards, including the 1988 Frederick Emmons Terman Award from the American Society for Engineering Education, the 1996 IEEE Education Medal, the 2000 "IEEE Third Millennium Medal", the 2002 "Engineering Medal for Excellence" from Professional Engineers Ontario, the 2002 "Engineering Alumni Medal" of the University of Toronto Engineering Alumni Association, and the 2010 "Outstanding Service Award to the Canadian Microelectronics Industry" from the Information Technology Association of Canada.

In 2002, the "Adel S. Sedra Distinguished Graduate Award" was created by the University of Toronto Alumni Association (UTAA), to honor Sedra for his accomplishments during his nine years as vice-president and provost of the University of Toronto. For every year since 2003, it has been awarded "to a graduate student who demonstrates outstanding academic and extracurricular leadership".

In 2013, the University of Waterloo's 20,000-square-foot student design centre located in Engineering 5 was named the "Sedra Student Design Centre" to honour Sedra as a former Dean of Waterloo Engineering.

In 2014, he was made a Member of the Order of Ontario in recognition for his " seminal work which has resulted in major developments in fields ranging from medical technology to wireless communications".

On June 30, 2025, Sedra was appointed to the Order of Canada by Her Excellency the Right Honourable Mary Simon, Governor General of Canada, stating that "[his] work has influenced developments from medical technology to wireless communications, and the education of generations of engineers across Canada and globally".

== See also ==
- List of University of Waterloo people
