= John Roe (mathematician) =

British mathematician

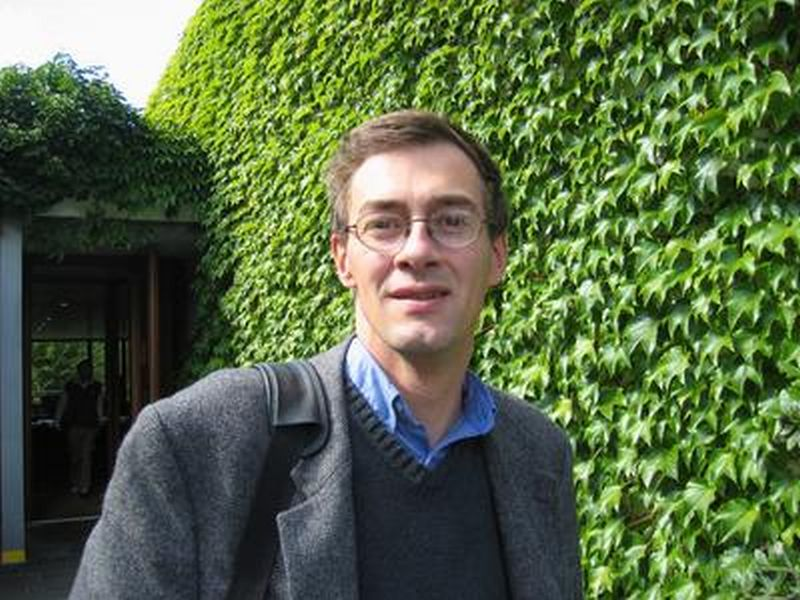
- John Roe, Oberwolfach 2004
- Born: 6 October 1959; Shropshire, England, UK
- Died: 9 March 2018 (aged 58)
- Awards: Whitehead Prize (1996)
- Scientific career
- Fields: Mathematics
- Workplaces: Pennsylvania State University

John Roe (6 October 1959 – 9 March 2018) was a British mathematician.

Roe grew up in the countryside in Shropshire. He went to Rugby School, was an undergraduate at Cambridge University, and received his D.Phil. in 1985 from the University of Oxford under the supervision of Michael Atiyah. As a post-doctoral student, he was at the Mathematical Sciences Research Institute (MSRI) in Berkeley, and then a tutor at Jesus College, Oxford. From 1998 until shortly before his death he was a professor at the Pennsylvania State University.

His research interests center around index theorems, coarse geometry, operator algebras, noncommutative geometry, and the Novikov conjecture in differential topology. He was an editor of the Journal of Noncommutative Geometry and the Journal of Topology.

In 1996 he was awarded the Whitehead Prize. In 2012 he became a fellow of the American Mathematical Society.

== Books ==
- Elementary Geometry
- Lectures on Coarse Geometry
- Winding Around, American Math Society, (2015)
- Analytic K-Homology with Nigel Higson
- Mathematics for Sustainability, Springer, (2018)
