= Alain Fournier (academic) =

French computer graphics researcher

Alain Fournier (1943–2000) was a computer graphics researcher and professor at the University of British Columbia.

== Biography ==
Alain Fournier was born on November 5, 1943, in Lyon, France. He was married twice, first to Beverly Bickle (married 1968, divorced 1984) and later to Adrienne Drobnies, with whom he had one daughter, Ariel.

Fournier's early training was in chemistry, culminating in a B.Sc. from INSA, France, in 1965. After emigrating from France to Montreal, Quebec, Canada in the 1970s, he co-wrote a textbook on chemistry, and taught the subject in Quebec. His career in computer graphics spanned only about 20 years. In 1980 he received a Ph.D. in computer science from the University of Texas at Dallas under the supervision of Zvi Meir Kedem, and with Donald Fussell and Loren Carpenter reported the results of his Ph.D. work on stochastic modelling in a seminal paper in 1980. He then went on to an outstanding academic career, first at the University of Toronto as part of the Dynamic Graphics Project and subsequently at the University of British Columbia. He has contributed to ACM Transactions on Graphics as an author, as co-guest editor of a special issue in 1987, and, from 1990 to 1992, as an associate editor.

Fournier made contributions to computer graphics dealing with modelling of natural phenomena. He advocated a methodology that required validation against real visual phenomena. He once called his approach impressionistic graphics and it both revolutionized the field and drove it forward. An example is his beautiful paper (with Bill Reeves) on the depiction of ocean waves. His subsequent work dealt with illumination models, light transport, rendering, and sampling and filtering.

Fournier died of lymphoma in the early hours of August 14, 2000, in Vancouver.

The SIGGRAPH 2001 Proceedings were dedicated to Fournier.

The first annual Alain Fournier Award for the best Canadian doctoral dissertation in computer graphics was awarded to Michael P. Neff on June 8, 2006, at the Graphics Interface 2006 conference in Quebec City.

== Publications ==
Fournier published 32 scholarly papers about computer graphics.

Bibliography for Alain Fournier
