= Israel Halperin =

Canadian mathematician

- Born: January 5, 1911; Toronto, Ontario, Canada
- Died: March 8, 2007 (aged 96)
- Education: University of Toronto; Princeton University (PhD)
- Known for: Acquittal in the 1946 Gouzenko Affair; Namesake of the Israel Halperin Prize
- Awards: Henry Marshall Tory Medal (1967); Jeffery–Williams Prize (1979)
- Scientific career
- Workplaces: Queen's University at Kingston; University of Toronto
- Doctoral advisor: Salomon Bochner and John von Neumann
- Doctoral students: George Elliott
- Military career
- Allegiance: Canada
- Branch: Canadian Army
- Years: 1942-1945
- Rank: Major
- Unit: Royal Canadian Artillery
- Conflicts: World War II

Israel Halperin CM FRSC (January 5, 1911 – March 8, 2007) was a Canadian mathematician and social activist.

== Early life and education ==
Israel Halperin was born in Toronto, Ontario, the son of Russian Jewish immigrants Solomon Halperin and Fanny Lundy. Halperin attended Malvern Collegiate Institute, Victoria University in the University of Toronto, graduated from the University of Toronto in 1932, and later was a graduate student of John von Neumann at Princeton University, where he received his doctorate in mathematics.

== Early career ==
After completing his doctorate in mathematics at Princeton, Halperin took a faculty position at Queen's University beginning in 1939. Halperin enlisted with the Canadian Army in 1942, serving until 1945 in Ottawa. Under the Royal Canadian Artillery, Halperin assisted with the Canadian Armament Research and Development Establishment (CARDE). He then returned to Queen's.

== Arrest and release ==
In February 1946, Halperin was arrested and accused of espionage in Canada, in connection with the defection of Igor Gouzenko, a Soviet cipher clerk, which occurred in Ottawa in September 1945. Gouzenko's defection and subsequent investigation showed that the Soviet Union was carrying on large-scale spying in Canada and the United States, including nuclear weapons espionage.

After some arduous questioning and confinement lasting several weeks, under a Royal Commission appointed by Justice Minister Louis St-Laurent, followed by a trial in early 1947, Halperin was eventually cleared and freed. He resumed teaching at Queen's, but not until 1948, following more legal hurdles which were raised by Queen's University leadership. Queen's Principal Robert Charles Wallace advocated his return.

== Later career ==
Following von Neumann's death in 1957, Halperin completed two of his unfinished papers, leaving them under von Neumann's name alone.

Halperin taught at Queen's until 1966, earning tenure as a full professor. He then moved to the University of Toronto until his retirement in 1976, by which time he had authored more than 100 academic papers.

In 1980, the Israel Halperin Prize was set up by the Canadian Annual Symposium on Operator Theory and Operator Algebras to be awarded to a member of the Canadian mathematical community who has recently obtained a doctorate and has made contributions to operator theory or operator algebras, in honor of Halperin.

Halperin was awarded an honorary doctorate of laws from Queen's in 1989, and was made a Member of the Order of Canada, both for his humanitarian work.

== Honours ==
Halperin was elected a Fellow of the Royal Society of Canada in 1953, and won the Henry Marshall Tory Medal in 1967.

== Personal life ==
Halperin was the father of four children, all of whom went on to become professors: William Halperin, Connie Eaves, Stephen Halperin, and Mary Hannah.

Halperin died in 2007 at age 96.
