= Israel Michael Sigal =

Canadian mathematician

- Born: 31 August 1945 (age 81); Kiev, Ukrainian SSR
- Citizenship: Israeli, Canadian
- Education: N. I. Lobachevsky State University of Nizhny Novgorod, Tel-Aviv University
- Awards: Fellow of the Royal Society of Canada (1998); Fellow of American Mathematical Society (2012)
- Scientific career
- Fields: Mathematics
- Workplaces: University of Toronto
- Doctoral students: Izabella Łaba; Michael Loss

Israel Michael Sigal FRSC (born 31 August 1945 in Kiev, Ukrainian SSR) is an Israeli, Canadian mathematician specializing in mathematical physics. He is a professor at the University of Toronto Department of Mathematics.

He was an invited speaker at International Congress of Mathematicians, Kyoto—1990 and in International Congress on Mathematical Physics, Lausanne—1979, W. Berlin—1981, Marseille—1986.

== Education ==
Born in Kiev, Ukrainian SSR, Sigal obtained his bachelor's degree at Gorky University and his Ph.D. at Tel-Aviv University

== Research interests ==
Partial differential equation of quantum physics, Quantum mechanics and quantum information theory, Quantum field theory, Statistical mechanics, Non-linear equations, Mathematical biology, Pattern recognition

== Awards ==
- The Jeffrey-Williams Lectureship, CMS Summer Meeting, 1992.
- John L. Synge Award, 1993.
- Fellow of the Royal Society of Canada, 1993.
- University Professor, 1997.
- Norman Stuart Robertson Chair in Applied Mathematics, 1998.
- CRM-Fields-PIMS prize, 2000.
- Fellow of the American Mathematical Society, 2012.

== Selected works ==
- Mathematical foundations of quantum scattering theory for multiparticle systems. Mem. Amer. Math. Soc. 1978. MR 0508478.
- Sigal, I. M. (1982). "Mathematical theory of single channel systems. Analyticity of scattering matrix". Trans. Amer. Math. Soc. 270 (2): 409–437. doi:10.1090/s0002-9947-1982-0645323-x. MR 0645323.
- Scattering theory for many body quantum-mechanical systems: rigorous results. Lecture Notes in Mathematics 1011. Springer Verlag. 1983.
- Bach, V.; Fröhlich, J.; Sigal, I. M. (1995). "Mathematical theory of nonrelativistic matter and radiation". Lett. Math. Phys. 34 (3): 183–201. Bibcode:1995LMaPh..34..183B. CiteSeerX 10.1.1.52.2248. doi:10.1007/bf01872776. S2CID 17664339.
- with Peter D. Hislop: Introduction to spectral theory: with applications to Schrödinger operators. Springer Verlag. 1996.
- with F. Ting: Sigal, I. M.; Ting, F. (2005). "Pinning of magnetic vortices by an external potential". St. Petersburg Math. J. 16 (1): 211–236. doi:10.1090/s1061-0022-04-00848-9. MR 2069485.
- with Stephen J. Gustafson: Mathematical concepts of quantum mechanics (2nd ed.). Springer Verlag. 2011.
