= Galit Shmueli =

Data Scientist

- גלית שמואלי
- Education: University of Haifa, Technion – Israel Institute of Technology
- Awards: Fellow of the Institute of Mathematical Statistics, Elected Member of the International Statistical Institute
- Scientific career
- Fields: Data science, statistics
- Workplaces: National Tsing Hua University, Indian School of Business, University of Maryland, Carnegie Mellon University
- Website: www.galitshmueli.com

Galit Shmueli (Hebrew: גלית שמואלי) is a data scientist who works in Taiwan as Tsing Hua Distinguished Professor at the Institute of Service Science, National Tsing Hua University. She is known for multiple research areas which includes statistical metholody (in particular, clarifying the difference between explanations and predictions in statistical analyses), business analytics, behavioural big data, and information quality as well her for her many textbooks in business analytics.

== Education ==
After first-year studies at the Hebrew University of Jerusalem, Shmueli graduated summa cum laude from the University of Haifa in 1994, with a bachelor's degree in statistics and psychology. She then moved to the Technion – Israel Institute of Technology for graduate study in the statistics program of the faculty of industrial engineering and management, earning a master's degree in 1997 and completing her Ph.D. in 2000. Her dissertation, Run-Related Distributions and their Application to Industrial Statistics, was jointly supervised by Ayala Cohen and Paul D. Feigin.

== Career ==
After a visiting assistant professorship at Carnegie Mellon University, Shmueli became an assistant professor of statistics in the department of decision, operation, and information technologies in the Robert H. Smith School of Business at the University of Maryland, College Park in 2002, where she was tenured in 2007. After a sabbatical in Bhutan she became Professor in Residence and Co-Director of Rigsum Research Lab at the Rigsum Institute of IT & Management in Bhutan from 2010 to 2014. She joined the Indian School of Business in Hyderabad as SRITNE Chaired Professor of Data Analytics in 2011, and she co-directed the Srini Raju Centre for IT and the Networked Economy there from 2012 to 2013. She moved again to National Tsing Hua University as Tsing Hua Distinguished Professor in 2014. At National Tsing Hua University she was Director of the Center for Service Innovation & Analytics at the university's College of Technology Management from 2014 to 2020. From 2020 to 2022 she has directed the Institute of Service Science at National Tsing Hua University.

Shmueli is the founding editor-in-chief of the INFORMS Journal on Data Science, serving from 2020 to 2024.

In 2025, Shmueli was appointed Vice President for Global Affairs at National Tsing Hua University (NTHU) in Taiwan.

== Research ==
Shmueli's research is broad and includes statistical and machine learning methodology, statistical strategy, and business analytics, with applications spanning information systems, healthcare, biosurveillance, and e-commerce.

=== Explanation versus prediction ===
Shmueli is widely known for clarifying the theoretical and practical distinctions between explanatory and predictive modeling. In her seminal 2010 paper, "To Explain or to Predict?", she analyzed the divergent roles of statistical models designed for causal explanation (minimizing bias to test causal hypotheses) versus those designed for empirical prediction (minimizing predictive error to forecast new observations). The work addressed widespread conflation of the two paradigms across empirical fields, including information systems, econometrics, and the social sciences, and established methodological guidelines for selecting modeling techniques, evaluating model performance, and interpreting results.

=== Electronic commerce and biosurveillance ===
Shmueli has made contributions to the statistical analysis of large-scale digital behavioral data. In the field of electronic commerce, her research (frequently in collaboration with Wolfgang Jank) introduced statistical approaches for modeling online auction dynamics, bidding behavior, and consumer surplus, culminating in the books ''Statistical Methods in eCommerce Research'' (2008) and ''Modeling Online Auctions'' (2010). Earlier in her career, she also worked extensively on statistical surveillance and temporal anomaly detection algorithms for early outbreak detection in public health biosurveillance systems.

=== Information quality (InfoQ) ===
Together with statistician Ron S. Kenett, Shmueli developed the Information Quality (InfoQ) framework. InfoQ evaluates the potential of a dataset and an analytics method to generate actionable knowledge in relation to a specific study or business goal. Shmueli and Kenett' 2017 book, Information Quality: The Potential of Data and Analytics to Generate Knowledge, details the framework and provides formal dimensions to assess the utility and robustness of empirical findings across the entire data analysis pipeline.

== Books ==
Shmueli's books include:

- Data Mining for Business Intelligence: Concepts, Techniques, and Applications (with N. R. Patel and P. Bruce, Wiley, 2006; various later editions)
- Statistical Methods in eCommerce Research (with W. Jank, Wiley, 2008)
- Modeling Online Auctions (with W. Jank, Wiley, 2010)
- Getting Started with Business Analytics: Insightful Decision-Making (with D. R. Hardoon, Chapman & Hall / CRC, 2013)
- Information Quality: The Potential of Data and Analytics to Generate Knowledge (with R. S. Kenett, Wiley, 2017)

== Recognition ==
Shmueli was named a Fellow of the Institute of Mathematical Statistics "for extraordinary contributions to statistical methods for biosurveillance, online commerce, and information quality, and for outstanding dissemination of statistical ideas through journal and textbook publications". She is also an Elected Member of the International Statistical Institute.
