= List of things named after Henri Poincaré =

In physics and mathematics, a number of ideas are named after Henri Poincaré:

- Euler–Poincaré characteristic
- Hilbert–Poincaré series
- Poincaré–Bendixson theorem
- Poincaré–Birkhoff theorem
- Poincaré–Birkhoff–Witt theorem, usually known as the PBW theorem
- Poincaré algebra
  - K-Poincaré algebra
  - Super-Poincaré algebra
- Poincaré–Bjerknes circulation theorem
- Poincaré complex
- Poincaré conjecture, one of the Millennium Prize Problems
  - Generalized Poincaré conjecture
- Poincaré disk model, a model of hyperbolic geometry
- Poincaré duality
  - Twisted Poincaré duality
- Poincaré–Einstein synchronization
- Poincaré expansion
- Poincaré group, the group of isometries of Minkowski spacetime, named in honour of Henri Poincaré
  - K-Poincaré group
- Poincaré half-plane model, a model of two-dimensional hyperbolic geometry
- Poincaré homology sphere
- Poincaré–Hopf theorem
- Poincaré inequality
  - Poincaré–Wirtinger inequality
- Poincaré–Lelong equation
- Poincaré lemma
- Poincaré-Lefschetz duality
- Poincaré–Lindstedt method
- Poincaré line bundle
- Poincaré map
- Poincaré metric
- Poincaré–Miranda theorem
- Poincaré–Neumann operator
- Poincaré plot
- Poincaré polynomial
- Poincaré recurrence
- Poincaré residue
- Poincaré separation theorem
- Poincaré series (modular form)
- Poincaré space
- Poincaré sphere (optics)
- Poincaré–Steklov operator
- Poincaré symmetry
- Poincaré wave

== Other ==
- Annales Henri Poincaré
- Institut Henri Poincaré
- Henri Poincaré Prize
- Henri Poincaré University
- Poincaré and the Three-Body Problem
- Poincaré (crater)
- Poincaré Medal
- Poincaré Seminars
- French submarine Henri Poincaré (Q140)

== Books with the title "Henri Poincaré" ==
- Appell, Paul (1925). Henri Poincaré. Paris: Plon-Nourrit et cie.
- Henri Poincaré (29 avril 1854-17 juillet 1912). Palermo, Italia: Circolo matematico di Palermo. 1913.
- Dantzig, Tobias (1954). Henri Poincaré, critic of crisis: reflections on his universe of discourse. New York: Scribner.
- Duplantier, Bertrand; Rivasseau, Vincent, eds. (2015). Henri Poincaré, 1912-2012 : Poincaré Seminar 2012. Basel : Birkhäuser; Basel : Springer. ISBN 9783034808347.
- Ginoux, Jean-Marc; Gerini, Christian (2012). Henri Poincaré : une biographie au(x) quotidien(s); préface de Cédric Villani. Paris: Ellipses.
- Gray, Jeremy (2013). Henri Poincaré : a scientific biography. Princeton University Press. ISBN 9780691152714.
- Greffe, Jean-Louis; Heinzmann, Gerhard; Lorenz, Kuno, eds. (1996). Henri Poincaré : science et philosophie : congrès international, Nancy, France, 1994. Berlin : Akademie Verlag, Paris : Albert Blanchard.
- Lebon, Ernest (1909). Henri Poincaré; biographie, bibliographie analytique des écrits. Paris: Gauthier-Villars. deuxième édition. Savants du jour. Gauthier-Villars. 1912.
- Lubomirski, Andrzej (1974). Henri Poincarégo filozofia geometrii. Wrocław: Zakład Narodowy im. Ossolińskich.
- Nordmann, Charles (1913). Henri Poincaré; his scientific work; his philosophy. Washington.
- Sageret, Jules (1911). Henri Poincaré. Les hommes et les idées. Paris: Mercure de France.
- Schmid, Anne-Françoise (2001). Henri Poincaré : les sciences et la philosophie : suivi en annexe des textes de Bertrand Russell sur La science et l'hypothèse et sur Science et méthode. Paris: L'Harmattan.
- Toulouse, Édouard (1910). Henri Poincaré. Enquête médico-psychologique sur la supériorité intellectuelle.[Tome 2.] Paris: E. Flammarion.
- Verhulst, Ferdinand (2012). Henri Poincaré : impatient genius. New York: Springer. ISBN 9781461424079.
- Volterra, Vito; Hadamard, Jacques; Langevin, Paul; Boutron, Pierre (1914). Henri Poincaré: l'œuvre scientifique, l'œuvre philosophique. Nouvelle collection scientifique. Paris: F. Alcan.
