= Kappa-Poincaré =

κ-Poincaré or kappa-Poincaré, so named after Henri Poincaré, may refer to:

- K-Poincaré algebra, Kappa-Poincaré Hopf algebra
- K-Poincaré group, the Kappa-Poincaré group
