= Poincaré series =

Poincaré series may refer to

- Poincaré series (modular form), associated to a discrete group, in the theory of modular forms
- Hilbert–Poincaré series, associated to a graded vector space, in algebra
