= Mironenko =

Myronenko (Ukrainian: Мироненко), Mironenko (Russian: Мироненко), or Mironienka (Belarusian: Міроненка) is a gender-neutral East Slavic (of Ukrainian origin) surname. It may refer to:

- Alexander Mironenko (1959–1980), Soviet soldier
- Andriy Myronenko (born 1994), Ukrainian basketball player
- Dmytro Myronenko (born 1996), Ukrainian footballer
- Irina Mironenko, Soviet pair skater
- Vitaliy Mironenko (born 1985), Kazakhstani volleyball player
- Vladimir Mironenko (born 1942), Belarusian mathematician
  - Mironenko reflecting function
