= Lindstedt =

Lindstedt may refer to:

- Lindstedt (Gardelegen), a district of Gardelegen in Germany
- Castle Lindstedt, a castle in Brandenburg in Germany

Lindstedt is the name of:

- Anders Lindstedt (1854–1939), Swedish mathematician and astronomer
- Carl-Gustaf Lindstedt (1921–1992), Swedish actor
- Hans Dietrich Lindstedt (1929–2008), German author and journalist
- Berndt Lindstedt (born 1936)
- Pierre Lindstedt (born 1943), Swedish actor
- Jouko Lindstedt (born 1955), Finnish linguist
- Annica Lindstedt (born 1976), Swedish former professional tennis player
- Laura Lindstedt (born 1976), Finnish writer
- Robert Lindstedt (born 1977), Swedish tennis player
- Rosa Lindstedt (born 1988), Finnish ice hockey player
- Oskar Lindstedt (born 1993), Swedish ice hockey defenceman
