= Poincaré Medal =

Math award from the Institut de France, Academy of Sciences

- Awarded for: Excellence in mathematics
- Presented by: Institut de France, Academie des Sciences, Fondation Henri Poincaré
- Established: 1914
- First award: 1954
- Final award: 1992

The Henri Poincaré Medal (Médaille Henri Poincaré) is a mathematics award from the Institut de France, Academie des Sciences, Fondation Henri Poincaré. The medal recognizes an eminent mathematician and is awarded only on exceptional occasions. It was established in 1914 and was eliminated in 1997 in favor of the Grande Médaille.

It should be distinguished from the Henri Poincaré Prize of the International Association of Mathematical Physics, and from various other medals featuring Poincaré's name and likeness.

== Recipients ==
- 1954 Georges Valiron
- 1974 Pierre Deligne
- 1992 John G. Thompson

== See also ==
- List of things named after Henri Poincaré
- List of mathematics awards
