= Vincent Rivasseau =

French mathematical physicist

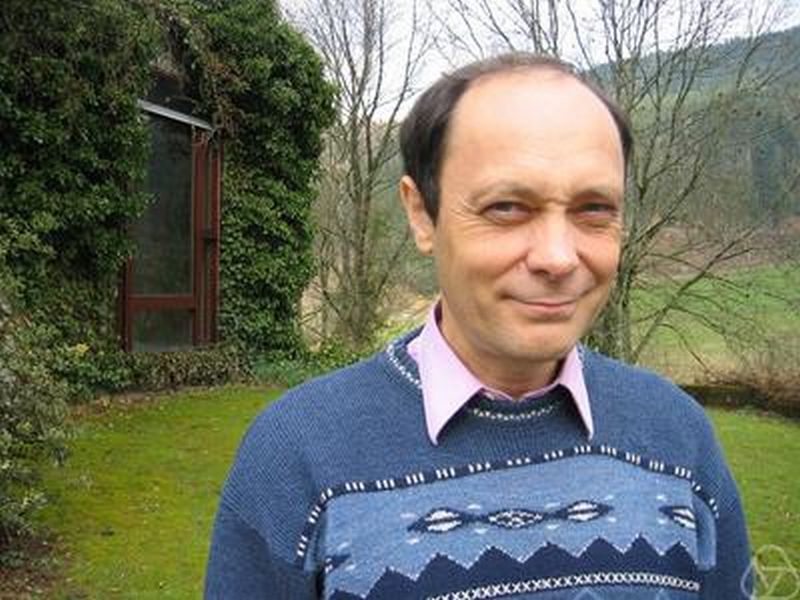
Vincent Rivasseau at the MFO, 2006

Vincent Rivasseau (born 5 December 1955 in Talence) is a French mathematical physicist.

Rivasseau studied from 1974 to 1978 at the École Normale Supérieure and then in 1978/79 at Princeton University with Arthur Wightman as advisor. In 1979 he got his PhD (Thèse de troisième cycle, Sommations et Estimations d'amplitudes de Feynman), at the Pierre and Marie Curie University, followed by the Thèse d'État (1982, Développements asymptotiques et méthodes graphiques en physique mathématique). From 1981 to 2001 he was a scientist of the CNRS at the Center for Theoretical Physics of École Polytechnique. Since 2001 he is professor of physics at the University of Paris-Sud in Orsay.

Rivasseau's research deals with constructive quantum field theory and renormalization theory with applications to many-body theory, such as quantum interacting fermions in solid state physics. Since 2004 he has studied quantum field theories on noncommutative space-time, then group field theory. Since 2011 he develops the tensor track approach to quantum gravity based on random tensors (higher-dimensional generalizations of random matrices).

From 2000 to 2012 he was editor in chief of Annales Henri Poincaré and is currently co-editor in chief of Annales de l'Institut Henri Poincaré D .

He is committed to the development of science in Africa, being a co-founder of the AIMS-Sénégal Institute (2011) and former president of the Association pour la Promotion Scientifique de l'Afrique , which he founded in 2009. He is also co-organizer of the Poincaré Seminars at the Institut Henri Poincaré.

== Books ==
- From Perturbative to Constructive Renormalization Princeton University Press, Princeton NJ u. a. 1991, ISBN 0-691-08530-7.
