= Qualitative theory of differential equations =

In mathematics, the qualitative theory of differential equations studies the behavior of differential equations by means other than finding their solutions. It originated from the works of Henri Poincaré and Aleksandr Lyapunov. There are relatively few differential equations that can be solved explicitly, but using tools from analysis and topology, one can "solve" them in the qualitative sense, obtaining information about their properties.

It was used by Benjamin Kuipers in the book Qualitative reasoning: modeling and simulation with incomplete knowledge to demonstrate how the theory of PDEs can be applied even in situations where only qualitative knowledge is available.
