= Anders Lindstedt =

Swedish mathematician and astronomer (1854–1939)

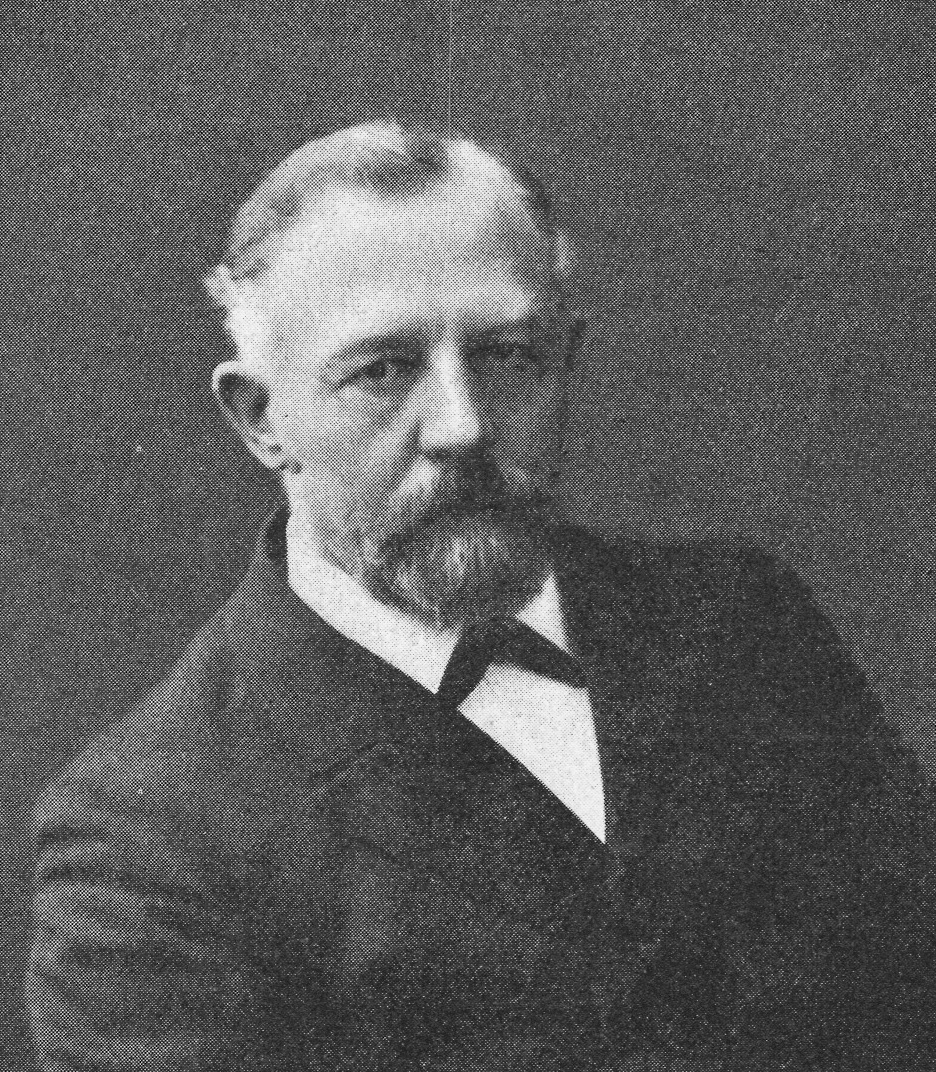
- Born: 27 June 1854; Dalecarlia, Sweden
- Died: 16 May 1939 (aged 84); Stockholm, Sweden
- Known for: Lindstedt-Poincaré method
- Scientific career
- Fields: Mathematics, astronomy and actuarial science

Anders Lindstedt (27 June 1854 – 16 May 1939) was a Swedish mathematician, astronomer, and actuarial scientist, known for the Lindstedt-Poincaré method.

== Life and work ==
Lindstedt was born in a small village in the district of Sundborns, Dalecarlia a province in central Sweden. He obtained a PhD from the University of Lund aged 32 and was subsequently appointed as a lecturer in astronomy. He later went on to a position at the University of Dorpat (then belonging to Russia, now University of Tartu in Estonia) where he worked for around seven years on theoretical astronomy. He combined practical astronomy with an interest in theory, developing especially an interest in the three-body problem This work was to influence Poincaré whose work on the three-body problem led to the discovery that there can be orbits which are nonperiodic, and yet not forever increasing nor approaching a fixed point, the beginning of what we now know as 'chaos theory'.

His papers on celestial mechanics written during that period include a technique for uniformly approximating periodic solutions to ordinary differential equations when regular perturbation approaches fail. This was later developed by Henri Poincaré and is known today as the Lindstedt–Poincaré method.

Lindstedt returned to Sweden in 1886 to take a post as professor at the Royal Institute of Technology in Stockholm, where he was rector from 1903 to 1909. During his time at the institute, until 1909, he developed an interest in actuarial science. He made contributions to the theory of pension funds and worked as a member of government committees responsible for insurance law and social insurance. He became a corresponding member of the Institute of Actuaries in London. He was for a time Kings Inspector of insurance companies.

In 1909 he resigned his professorial position to work full-time on insurance. From 1909 to 1916 Lindstedt was also a Justice of the Supreme Administrative Court of Sweden. In 1912 Lindstedt constructed a life table for annuities using data from Swedish population experience and for each age was able to extrapolate the sequence of annual probability of death, namely the mortality profile. Probably, this work constitutes the earliest projection of age-specific functions. He directed the actuarial work which underpinned the state old age an invalidity pensions in Sweden introduced in 1913 as part of the National Pension Act (see Swedish welfare).

Even after his retirement aged 70 he continued to take an active interest in actuarial activities both in Sweden and abroad, attending meetings of the Swedish Actuarial Society until shortly before his death in 1939.
