= Poincaré–Birkhoff theorem =

Theorem in symplectic topology

In symplectic topology and dynamical systems, Poincaré–Birkhoff theorem (also known as Poincaré–Birkhoff fixed point theorem and Poincaré's last geometric theorem) states that every area-preserving, orientation-preserving homeomorphism of an annulus that rotates the two boundaries in opposite directions has at least two fixed points.

== History ==
The Poincaré–Birkhoff theorem was discovered by Henri Poincaré, who published it in a 1912 paper titled "Sur un théorème de géométrie", and proved it for some special cases. The general case was proved by George D. Birkhoff in his 1913 paper titled "Proof of Poincaré's geometric theorem".
