= Vladimir Mironenko =

Belarusian mathematician (born 1942)

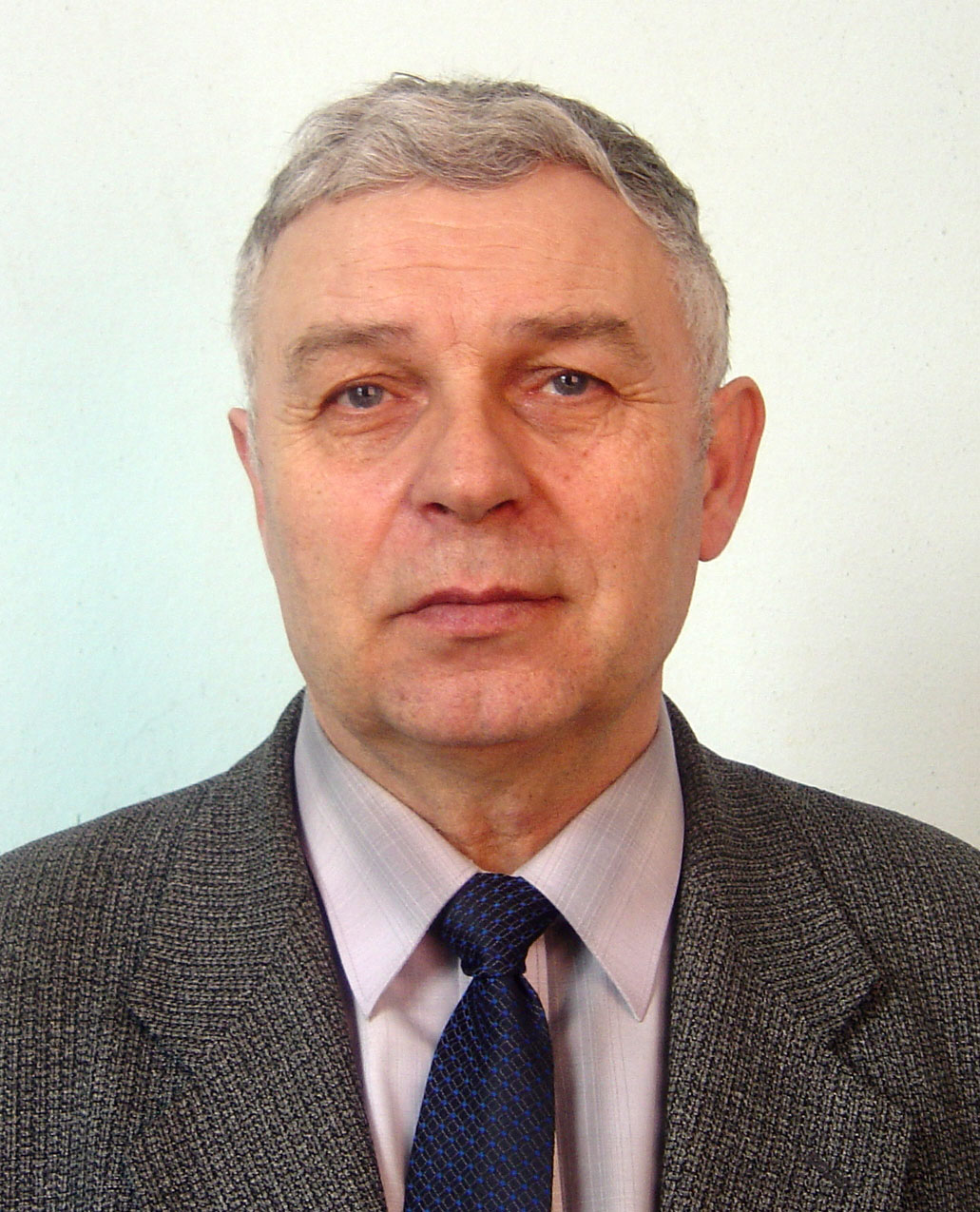
Uladzimir Ivanavich Mironenka

Uladzimir Ivanavich Mironenka (Belarusian: Уладзімір Іванавіч Міроненка; born 9 February 1942, Bych, Homel region, Belarus) is a Belarusian mathematician.

== Biography ==
In 1964 Uladzimir Ivanavich graduated from Mogilev State University, Faculty of Physics and Mathematics. In 1970 he defended his PhD thesis on the topic "Embeddable Systems". In 1975 approved in the rank of associate professor and in 1992 in the rank of professor.

Professor Mironenka has introduced in the theory of the differential equations motions of φ-solution, embeddable system and reflecting function. He applied these concepts to study of the existence of periodic solutions and solutions boundary value problems of differential systems, and to study of stability of these solutions.

== Literature ==
- Мироненко В. И. Отражающая функция и исследование многомерных дифференциальных систем. – Мин. образов. РБ, ГГУ им. Ф. Скорины“. – Гомель, 2004. – 196 с.
- Мироненко В. И. Линейная зависимость функций вдоль решений дифференциальных уравнений. – Изд-во БГУ им. В. И. Ленина, Минск, 1981. – 104 с.
- Мироненко В. И. Отражающая функция и периодические решения дифференциальных систем. – Изд-во «Университетское», Минск, 1986, – 76 с.
- Mironenko V. I., Mironenko V. V. Time symmetry preserving perturbations of systems, and Poincaré mappings. 2008, Differential equations, volume 44, № 10, 1406–1411.
- Mironenko V. I., Mironenko V. V. How to construct equivalent differential systems. Applied Mathematic Letters, 22 (2009), 1356–1359.
- Mironenko V. I., Mironenko V. V. Time symmetries and in-period transformations. Applied Mathematic Letters, 24 (2011), 1721–1723.
- Mironenko V. I., Mironenko V. V. The New Method for the Searching Periodic Solutions of Periodic Differential Systems. Journal of Applied Analysis and Computation, Vol. 6, Num. 3, 2016, 876-883
