= K-Poincaré group =

In physics and mathematics, the κ-Poincaré group, named after Henri Poincaré, is a quantum group, obtained by deformation of the Poincaré group into a Hopf algebra. It is generated by the elements $a^\mu$ and ${\Lambda^\mu}_\nu$ with the usual constraint:

$$\eta^{\rho \sigma} {\Lambda^\mu}_\rho {\Lambda^\nu}_\sigma = \eta^{\mu \nu} ~,$$

where $\eta^{\mu \nu}$ is the Minkowskian metric:

$$\eta^{\mu \nu} = \left(\begin{array}{cccc} -1 & 0 & 0 & 0 \\ 0 & 1 & 0 & 0 \\ 0 & 0 & 1 & 0 \\ 0 & 0 & 0 & 1 \end{array} \right) ~.$$

The commutation rules reads:

- $[a_j ,a_0] = i \lambda a_j ~, \; [a_j,a_k]=0$
- $[a^\mu , {\Lambda^\rho}_\sigma ] = i \lambda \left\{ \left( {\Lambda^\rho}_0 - {\delta^\rho}_0 \right) {\Lambda^\mu}_\sigma - \left( {\Lambda^\alpha}_\sigma \eta_{\alpha 0} + \eta_{\sigma 0} \right) \eta^{\rho \mu} \right\}$

In the (1 + 1)-dimensional case the commutation rules between $a^\mu$ and ${\Lambda^\mu}_\nu$ are particularly simple. The Lorentz generator in this case is:

$${\Lambda^\mu}_\nu = \left( \begin{array}{cc} \cosh \tau  & \sinh \tau \\ \sinh \tau & \cosh \tau \end{array} \right)$$

and the commutation rules reads:

- $[ a_0 , \left( \begin{array}{c} \cosh \tau \\ \sinh \tau \end{array} \right) ] = i \lambda ~ \sinh \tau \left( \begin{array}{c} \sinh \tau \\ \cosh \tau \end{array} \right)$
- $[ a_1 , \left( \begin{array}{c} \cosh \tau \\ \sinh \tau \end{array} \right) ] = i \lambda \left( 1- \cosh \tau \right) \left( \begin{array}{c} \sinh \tau \\ \cosh \tau \end{array} \right)$

The coproducts are classical, and encode the group composition law:

- $\Delta a^\mu = {\Lambda^\mu}_\nu \otimes a^\nu + a^\mu \otimes 1$
- $\Delta {\Lambda^\mu}_\nu = {\Lambda^\mu}_\rho \otimes {\Lambda^\rho}_\nu$

Also the antipodes and the counits are classical, and represent the group inversion law and the map to the identity:

- $S(a^\mu) = - {(\Lambda^{-1})^\mu}_\nu a^\nu$
- $S({\Lambda^\mu}_\nu) = {(\Lambda^{-1})^\mu}_\nu = {\Lambda_\nu}^\mu$
- $\varepsilon (a^\mu) = 0$
- $\varepsilon ({\Lambda^\mu}_\nu) ={\delta^\mu}_\nu$

The κ-Poincaré group is the dual Hopf algebra to the K-Poincaré algebra, and can be interpreted as its “finite” version.
