= Poincaré separation theorem =

Theorem on eigenvalues and eigenvectors of Hermitian matrices

In mathematics, the Poincaré separation theorem, also known as the Cauchy interlacing theorem, gives some upper and lower bounds of eigenvalues of a real symmetric matrix B^{T}AB that can be considered as the orthogonal projection of a larger real symmetric matrix A onto a linear subspace spanned by the columns of B. The theorem is named after Henri Poincaré.

More specifically, let A be an n × n real symmetric matrix and B an n × r semi-orthogonal matrix such that B^{T}B = I_{r}. Denote by $\lambda_i$, i = 1, 2, ..., n and $\mu_i$, i = 1, 2, ..., r the eigenvalues of A and B^{T}AB, respectively (in descending order). We have

$$\lambda_i \geq \mu_i \geq \lambda_{n-r+i},$$

== Proof ==
An algebraic proof, based on the variational interpretation of eigenvalues, has been published in Magnus' Matrix Differential Calculus with Applications in Statistics and Econometrics. From the geometric point of view, B^{T}AB can be considered as the orthogonal projection of A onto the linear subspace spanned by B, so the above results follow immediately.

An alternative proof can be made for the case where B is a principal submatrix of A, demonstrated by Steve Fisk.

== Applications ==
When considering two mechanical systems, each described by an equation of motion, that differ by exactly one constraint (such that $n-r =1$), the natural frequencies of the two systems interlace.

This has an important consequence when considering the frequency response of a complicated system such as a large room. Even though there may be many modes, each with unpredictable modes shapes that will vary as details change such as furniture being moved, the interlacing theorem implies that the modal density (average number of modes per frequency interval) remains predictable and approximately constant. This allows for the technique of modal density analysis.

== See also ==
Min-max theorem#Cauchy interlacing theorem
