= Oskar Lindstedt =

Swedish ice hockey player

- Born: July 16, 1993 (age 32) Stockholm, Sweden
- Height: 6 ft 0 in (183 cm)
- Weight: 194 lb (88 kg; 13 st 12 lb)
- Position: Defence
- Shot: Right
- Played for: AIK IF; Tranås AIF; Visby/Roma HK; Väsby IK HK; CCCP HC
- Playing career: 2011–2018

Oskar Lindstedt (born July 16, 1993) is a Swedish ice hockey defenceman. He is currently playing with AIK IF in the Elitserien.

== Career statistics ==
			Regular season					Playoffs
Season	Team	League	GP	G	A	Pts	PIM	GP	G	A	Pts	PIM
2008–09	SDE HF J18	J18 Elit	25	2	6	8	42	—	—	—	—	—
2009–10	AIK IF J18	J18 Elit	20	2	8	10	38	—	—	—	—	—
2009–10	AIK IF J18	J18 Allsvenskan	16	1	1	2	20	2	0	0	0	2
2010–11	AIK IF J18	J18 Elit	14	3	5	8	18	—	—	—	—	—
2010–11	AIK IF J18	J18 Allsvenskan	18	3	7	10	61	6	1	1	2	6
2010–11	AIK IF J20	J20 SuperElit	14	0	1	1	10	—	—	—	—	—
2011–12	AIK IF J20	J20 SuperElit	45	4	6	10	36	3	0	0	0	6
2011–12	AIK IF	Elitserien	3	0	0	0	0	—	—	—	—	—
2012–13	Djurgårdens IF J20	J20 SuperElit	42	2	12	14	83	2	0	0	0	0
2013–14	Tranås AIF	Hockeyettan	39	8	10	18	69	—	—	—	—	—
2013–14	Visby/Roma HK	Hockeyettan	1	0	0	0	0	4	0	1	1	0
2014–15	Visby/Roma HK	Hockeyettan	20	0	4	4	8	—	—	—	—	—
2015–16	Väsby IK HK J20	J20 Div.1	2	1	2	3	4	—	—	—	—	—
2015–16	Väsby IK HK	Hockeyettan	31	1	5	6	18	—	—	—	—	—
2016–17	Väsby IK HK	Hockeyettan	8	3	1	4	16	—	—	—	—	—
2017–18	CCCP HC	Division 4	4	0	3	3	8	—	—	—	—	—
Elitserien totals			3	0	0	0	0	—	—	—	—	—
Hockeyettan totals			99	12	20	32	111	4	0	1	1	0
