= K-Poincaré algebra =

In physics and mathematics, the κ-Poincaré algebra, named after Henri Poincaré, is a deformation of the Poincaré algebra into a Hopf algebra. In the bicrossproduct basis, introduced by Majid-Ruegg its commutation rules reads:

- $[P_\mu, P_\nu] = 0$
- $[R_j , P_0] = 0, \; [R_j , P_k] = i \varepsilon_{jkl} P_l, \; [R_j , N_k] = i \varepsilon_{jkl} N_l, \; [R_j , R_k] = i \varepsilon_{jkl} R_l$
- $[N_j , P_0] = i P_j, \;[N_j , P_k] = i \delta_{jk} \left( \frac{1 - e^{- 2 \lambda P_0}}{2 \lambda} + \frac{ \lambda }{2} |\vec{P}|^2 \right) - i \lambda P_j P_k, \; [N_j,N_k] = -i \varepsilon_{jkl} R_l$

Where $P_\mu$ are the translation generators, $R_j$ the rotations and $N_j$ the boosts. The coproducts are:

- $\Delta P_j = P_j \otimes 1 + e^{- \lambda P_0} \otimes P_j ~, \qquad \Delta P_0 = P_0 \otimes 1 + 1 \otimes P_0$
- $\Delta R_j = R_j \otimes 1 + 1 \otimes R_j$
- $\Delta N_k = N_k \otimes 1 + e^{-\lambda P_0} \otimes N_k + i \lambda \varepsilon_{klm} P_l \otimes R_m .$

The antipodes and the counits:

- $S(P_0) = - P_0$
- $S(P_j) = -e^{\lambda P_0} P_j$
- $S(R_j) = - R_j$
- $S(N_j) = -e^{\lambda P_0}N_j +i \lambda \varepsilon_{jkl} e^{\lambda P_0} P_k R_l$
- $\varepsilon(P_0) = 0$
- $\varepsilon(P_j) = 0$
- $\varepsilon(R_j) = 0$
- $\varepsilon(N_j) = 0$

The κ-Poincaré algebra is the dual Hopf algebra to the κ-Poincaré group, and can be interpreted as its “infinitesimal” version.
