= Poincaré Seminars =

The Poincaré Seminars, named for the mathematician and theoretical physicist Henri Poincaré, were founded in 2001. They are nicknamed "Bourbaphy" for their inspiration by the Bourbaki Seminars.

The goal of this seminar is to provide information on topics of current interest in physics. Its way of working is directly inspired by the Bourbaki Seminar in mathematics. A series of pedagogical talks aims at explaining a topic of current interest both from a theoretical and an experimental point of view, possibly complemented by a historical introduction. A booklet with the contributions of the speakers is distributed on the day of the seminar. The seminar aims at a general audience of mathematicians and physicists and does not require any specialized knowledge.

== Publications ==
- Bertrand Duplantier; Vincent Rivasseau, eds. (2003), Vacuum Energy - Renormalization (Poincaré Seminar 2002), Progress in Mathematical Physics, vol. 30, Birkhäuser Verlag, ISBN 978-3-7643-0579-6, MR 2164890
- Jean Dalibard; Bertrand Duplantier; Vincent Rivasseau, eds. (2004), Bose-Einstein condensation - Entropy (Poincaré Seminar 2003), Progress in Mathematical Physics, vol. 38, Birkhäuser Verlag, ISBN 3-7643-7106-4, MR 2164890
- Benoît Douçot; Bertrand Duplantier; Vincent Pasquier; Vincent Rivasseau, eds. (2004), The Quantum Hall Effect (Poincaré Seminar 2004), Progress in Mathematical Physics, vol. 45, Birkhäuser Verlag
- Thibault Damour; Olivier Darrigol; Bertrand Duplantier; Vincent Rivasseau, eds. (2005), Einstein, 1905-2005 (Poincaré Seminar 2005), Progress in Mathematical Physics, vol. 47, Birkhäuser Verlag
- Bertrand Duplantier; Jean-Michel Raimond; Vincent Rivasseau, eds. (2005), Quantum Decoherence (Poincaré Seminar 2005), Progress in Mathematical Physics, vol. 48, Birkhäuser Verlag
- Thibault Damour; Bertrand Duplantier; Vincent Rivasseau, eds. (2006), Gravitation and Experiment (Poincaré Seminar 2006), Progress in Mathematical Physics, vol. 52, Birkhäuser Verlag
- Bertrand Duplantier; Jean-Michel Raimond; Vincent Rivasseau, eds. (2007), Quantum Spaces (Poincaré Seminar 2007), Progress in Mathematical Physics, vol. 53, Birkhäuser Verlag
- Bertrand Duplantier; Vincent Rivasseau, eds. (2007), The Spin (Poincaré Seminar 2007), Progress in Mathematical Physics, vol. 55, Birkhäuser Verlag
- Bertrand Duplantier; Vincent Rivasseau, eds. (2009), Biological Physics (Poincaré Seminar 2009), Progress in Mathematical Physics, vol. 60, Birkhäuser Verlag
- Bertrand Duplantier; Thomas Halsey; Vincent Rivasseau, eds. (2009), Glasses and Grains (Poincaré Seminar 2009), Progress in Mathematical Physics, vol. 61, Birkhäuser Verlag
- Bertrand Duplantier, ed. (2010), Time (Poincaré Seminar 2010), Progress in Mathematical Physics, vol. 63, Birkhäuser Verlag
- Bertrand Duplantier; Stéphane Nonnemacher; Vincent Rivasseau, eds. (2010), Chaos (Poincaré Seminar 2010), Progress in Mathematical Physics, vol. 66, Birkhäuser Verlag
- Bertrand Duplantier; Vincent Rivasseau, eds. (2012), Henri Poincaré, 1912-2012 (Poincaré Seminar 2012), Progress in Mathematical Physics, vol. 67, Birkhäuser Verlag
- Olivier Darrigol; Bertrand Duplantier; Jean-Michel Raimond; Vincent Rivasseau, eds. (2013), Niels Bohr, 1913-2013 (Poincaré Seminar 2013), Progress in Mathematical Physics, vol. 68, Birkhäuser Verlag
