= Poincaré–Lindstedt method =

Technique used in perturbation theory

In perturbation theory, the Poincaré–Lindstedt method or Lindstedt–Poincaré method is a technique for uniformly approximating periodic solutions to ordinary differential equations, when regular perturbation approaches fail. The method removes secular terms—terms growing without bound—arising in the straightforward application of perturbation theory to weakly nonlinear problems with finite oscillatory solutions.

The method is named after Henri Poincaré, and Anders Lindstedt.

All efforts of geometers in the second half of this century have had as main objective the elimination of secular terms.

— Henri Poincaré, Les Méthodes Nouvelles de la Mécanique Céleste, preface to volume I

The article gives several examples. The theory can be found in Chapter 10 of Nonlinear Differential Equations and Dynamical Systems by Verhulst.

== Example: the Duffing equation ==
The undamped, unforced Duffing equation is given by

$$\ddot{x} + x + \varepsilon\, x^3 = 0\,$$

for t > 0, with 0 < ε ≪ 1.

Consider initial conditions

$x(0) = 1,\,$ $\dot x(0) = 0.\,$

A perturbation-series solution of the form x(t) = x_{0}(t) + ε x_{1}(t) + ... is sought. The first two terms of the series are

$$x(t) = \cos(t) + \varepsilon \left[ \tfrac{1}{32}\, \left( \cos(3t) - \cos(t) \right) - \tfrac{3}{8}\, t\, \sin(t) \right] + \cdots.\,$$

This approximation grows without bound in time, which is inconsistent with the physical system that the equation models. The term responsible for this unbounded growth, called the secular term, is $t\sin(t)$. The Poincaré–Lindstedt method allows for the creation of an approximation that is accurate for all time, as follows.

In addition to expressing the solution itself as an asymptotic series, form another series with which to scale time t:

$\tau = \omega t,\,$ where $\omega = \omega_0 + \varepsilon \omega_1 + \cdots.\,$

We have the leading order $\omega_0 = 1$, because when $\varepsilon = 0$, the equation has solution $x = \cos (t)$. Then the original problem becomes

$$\omega^2\, x''(\tau) + x(\tau) + \varepsilon\, x^3(\tau) = 0\,$$

Now search for a solution of the form x(τ) = x_{0}(τ) + ε x_{1}(τ) + ... . The following solutions for the zeroth and first order problem in $\varepsilon$ are obtained:

$$\begin{align}
x_0 &= \cos(\tau) \\
\text{and }
x_1 &= \tfrac{1}{32}\, \left(\cos(3\tau)-\cos(\tau)\right) + \left( \omega_1 - \tfrac{3}{8}  \right)\, \tau\, \sin(\tau).
\end{align}$$

So the secular term can be removed through the choice: ω_{1} = 3/8. Higher orders of accuracy can be obtained by continuing the perturbation analysis along this way. As of now, the approximation—correct up to first order in ε—is

$$x(t) \approx \cos\Bigl(\left(1 + \tfrac{3}{8}\, \varepsilon \right)\, t \Bigr)
+ \tfrac{1}{32}\, \varepsilon\, \left[\cos\Bigl( 3 \left(1 + \tfrac{3}{8}\,\varepsilon\, \right)\, t \Bigr)-\cos\Bigl(\left(1 + \tfrac{3}{8}\,\varepsilon\, \right)\, t \Bigr)\right]. \,$$

== Example: the van der Pol oscillator ==
We solve the van der Pol oscillator only up to order 2. This method can be continued indefinitely in the same way, where the order-n term $\epsilon^n x_n$ consists of a harmonic term $a_n\cos(t) + b_n\cos(t)$, plus some super-harmonic terms $a_{n, 2}\cos(2t) + b_{n, 2}\cos(2t) + \cdots.$ The coefficients of the super-harmonic terms are solved directly, and the coefficients of the harmonic term are determined by expanding down to order-(n+1), and eliminating its secular term.

See chapter 10 of for a derivation up to order 3, and for a computer derivation up to order 164.

Consider the van der Pol oscillator with equation
$$\ddot x + \epsilon (x^2-1) \dot x + x = 0$$
where $\epsilon$ is a small positive number. Perform substitution to the second order:

$\tau = \omega t,\,$ where $\omega = 1 + \epsilon \omega_1 + \epsilon^2 \omega_2 + O(\epsilon^3)$

which yields the equation
$$\omega^2\ddot x + \omega\epsilon (x^2-1) \dot x + x = 0$$
Now plug in $x = x_0 + \epsilon x_1 + \epsilon^2 x_2 + O(\epsilon^3)$, and we have three equations, for the orders $1, \epsilon, \epsilon^2$ respectively:
$$\begin{cases}
\ddot x_0 + x_0 = 0 \\
\ddot x_1 + x_1 + 2\omega_1 \ddot x_0 + (x_0^2-1)\dot x_0 = 0 \\
\ddot x_2 + x_2 + (\omega_1^2 + 2\omega_2)\ddot x_0 + 2\omega_1 \ddot x_1 + 2x_0x_1\dot x_0 + \omega_1(x_0^2-1)\dot x_0 + \dot x_1(x_0^2-1) = 0
\end{cases}$$
The first equation has general solution $x_0 =A \cos (\tau + \phi)$. Pick origin of time such that $\phi = 0$. Then plug it into the second equation to obtain (after some trigonometric identities)
$$\ddot x_1 + x_1 + (A-A^3/4) \sin\tau - 2\omega_1 A \cos \tau - (A^3/4) \sin(3\tau) = 0$$
To eliminate the secular term, we must set both $\sin\tau, \cos \tau$ coefficients to zero, thus we have
$$\begin{cases}
A= A^3/4 \\
2\omega_1 A = 0
\end{cases}$$
yielding $A = 2, \omega_1 = 0$. In particular, we found that when $\epsilon$ increases from zero to a small positive constant, all circular orbits in phase space are destroyed, except the one at radius 2. Now solving $\ddot x_1 + x_1 = 2\sin(3\tau)$ yields $x_1 = B \cos(\tau + \phi) -\frac 14 \sin(3\tau)$. We can always absorb $\epsilon B\cos(\tau + \phi)$ term into $x_0$, so we can WLOG have just $x_1 = -\frac 14 \sin(3\tau)$.

Now plug into the second equation to obtain
$$\ddot x_2 + x_2 -(4\omega_2 + 1/4)\cos\tau - \frac 34 \cos 3\tau - \frac 54 \cos 5\tau = 0$$
To eliminate the secular term, we set $\omega_2 = -\frac{1}{16}$.

Thus we find that $\omega = 1 - \frac{1}{16}\epsilon^2 + O(\epsilon^3)$.

== Example: Mathieu equation ==
This is an example of parametric resonance.

Consider the Mathieu equation $\ddot x + (1 + b\epsilon^2 + \epsilon \cos(t))x = 0$, where $b$ is a constant, and $\epsilon$ is small. The equation's solution would have two time-scales, one fast-varying on the order of $t$, and another slow-varying on the order of $T = \epsilon^2 t$. So expand the solution as
$$x(t) = x_0(t, T) + \epsilon x_1(t, T) + \epsilon^2 x_2(t, T) + O(\epsilon^3)$$
Now plug into the Mathieu equation and expand to obtain
$$\begin{cases}
\partial_t^2 x_0 + x_0 = 0 \\
\partial_t^2 x_1 + x_1 = -\cos(t)x_0 \\
\partial_t^2 x_2 + x_2 = -bx_0 - 2\partial_{tT}x_0 - \cos(t)x_1
\end{cases}$$
As before, we have the solutions
$$\begin{cases}
x_0 = A\cos(t) + B \sin(t) \\
x_1 = -\frac A2 + \frac A6 \cos(2t) + \frac B6 \sin(2t)
\end{cases}$$
The secular term coefficients in the third equation are
$$\begin{cases}
\frac{1}{12} \left(-12 b A+5 A-24 B'\right) \\
\frac{1}{12} \left(24 A'-12 b B-B\right)
\end{cases}$$
Setting them to zero, we find the equations of motion:

$$\frac{d}{dT} \begin{bmatrix}
A \\ B
\end{bmatrix} =
\begin{bmatrix}
0 & \frac 12 (\frac{1}{12} + b) \\
\frac 12 (\frac{5}{12} - b) & 0 \\
\end{bmatrix}
\begin{bmatrix}
A\\B
\end{bmatrix}$$

Its determinant is $\frac 14 (b-5/12) (b + 1/12)$, and so when $b \in (-1/12, 5/12)$, the origin is a saddle point, so the amplitude of oscillation $\sqrt{A^2 + B^2}$ grows unboundedly.

In other words, when the angular frequency (in this case, $1$) in the parameter is sufficiently close to the angular frequency (in this case, $\sqrt{1+b\epsilon^2 }$) of the original oscillator, the oscillation grows unboundedly, like a child swinging on a swing pumping all the way to the moon.

== Shohat expansion ==
For the van der Pol oscillator, we have $\omega \sim 1/\epsilon$ for large $\epsilon$, so as $\epsilon$ becomes large, the serial expansion of $\omega$ in terms of $\epsilon$ diverges and we would need to keep more and more terms of it to keep $\omega$ bounded. This suggests to us a parametrization that is bounded:
$$r := \frac{\epsilon}{1+\epsilon}$$
Then, using serial expansions $\epsilon \omega = r + c_2 r^2 + c_3 r^3 + c_4 r^4 + \cdots$ and $x = x_0 + r x_1 + r^2 x_2 + \cdots$, and using the same method of eliminating the secular terms, we find $c_2 = 1, c_3 = \frac{15}{16}, c_4 = \frac{13}{16}$.

Because $\lim_{\epsilon \to \infty}r = 1$, the expansion $\epsilon \omega = r + c_2 r^2 + c_3 r^3 + c_4 r^4 + \cdots$ allows us to take a finite number of terms for the series on the right, and it would converge to a finite value at $\epsilon \to \infty$ limit. Then we would have $\omega \sim 1/\epsilon$, which is exactly the desired asymptotic behavior. This is the idea behind Shohat expansion.

The exact asymptotic constant is $\epsilon\omega \to \frac{2\pi}{3-2\ln 2} = 3.8936\cdots$, which as we can see is approached by $1 + c_2 + c_3 + c_4 = 3.75$.
