= Mironenko reflecting function =

Mathematical function

In applied mathematics, the reflecting function $\,F(t,x)$ of a differential system $\dot x=X(t,x)$ connects the past state $\,x(-t)$ of the system with the future state $\,x(t)$ of the system by the formula $\,x(-t)=F(t,x(t)).$ The concept of the reflecting function was introduced by Uladzimir Ivanavich Mironenka.

== Definition ==
For the differential system $\dot x=X(t,x)$ with the general solution $\varphi(t;t_0,x)$ in Cauchy form, the Reflecting Function of the system is defined by the formula $F(t,x)=\varphi(-t;t,x).$

== Application ==
If a vector-function $X(t,x)$ is $\,2\omega$-periodic with respect to $\,t$, then $\,F(-\omega,x)$ is the in-period $\,[-\omega;\omega]$ transformation (Poincaré map) of the differential system $\dot x=X(t,x).$ Therefore the knowledge of the Reflecting Function give us the opportunity to find out the initial dates $\,(\omega,x_0)$ of periodic solutions of the differential system $\dot x=X(t,x)$ and investigate the stability of those solutions.

For the Reflecting Function $\,F(t,x)$ of the system $\dot x=X(t,x)$ the basic relation

$$\,F_t+F_x X+X(-t,F)=0,\qquad F(0,x)=x.$$

is holding.

Therefore we have an opportunity sometimes to find Poincaré map of the non-integrable in quadrature systems even in elementary functions.

== Literature ==
- Мироненко В. И. Отражающая функция и периодические решения дифференциальных уравнений. — Минск, Университетское, 1986. — 76 с.
- Мироненко В. И. Отражающая функция и исследование многомерных дифференциальных систем. — Гомель: Мин. образов. РБ, ГГУ им. Ф. Скорины, 2004. — 196 с.
