= Hilbert–Poincaré series =

Formal power series in algebra

In mathematics, and in particular in the field of algebra, a Hilbert–Poincaré series (also known under the name Hilbert series), named after David Hilbert and Henri Poincaré, is an adaptation of the notion of dimension to the context of graded algebraic structures (where the dimension of the entire structure is often infinite). It is a formal power series in one indeterminate, say $t$, where the coefficient of $t^n$ gives the dimension (or rank) of the sub-structure of elements homogeneous of degree $n$. That is, it is a Generating function of the dimensions.

It is closely related to the Hilbert polynomial in cases when the latter exists; however, the Hilbert–Poincaré series describes the rank in every degree, while the Hilbert polynomial describes it only in all but finitely many degrees, and therefore provides less information. In particular the Hilbert–Poincaré series cannot be deduced from the Hilbert polynomial even if the latter exists. In good cases, the Hilbert–Poincaré series can be expressed as a rational function of its argument $t$.

== Definition ==
Let K be a field, and let $V=\textstyle\bigoplus_{i\in\N}V_i$ be an $\mathbb{N}$-graded vector space over K, where each subspace $V_i$ of vectors of degree i is finite-dimensional. Then the Hilbert–Poincaré series of V is the formal power series

$\sum_{i\in\N}\dim_K(V_i)t^i.$

A similar definition can be given for an $\N$-graded R-module over any commutative ring R in which each submodule of elements homogeneous of a fixed degree n is free of finite rank; it suffices to replace the dimension by the rank. Often the graded vector space or module of which the Hilbert–Poincaré series is considered has additional structure, for instance, that of a ring, but the Hilbert–Poincaré series is independent of the multiplicative or other structure.

Example: Since there are $\textstyle\binom {n+k}{k}$ monomials of degree k in variables $X_0, \dots, X_n$ (by induction, say), one can deduce that the sum of the Hilbert–Poincaré series of $K[X_0, \dots, X_n]$ is the rational function $1/(1-t)^{n+1}$.

== Hilbert–Serre theorem ==
Suppose M is a finitely generated graded module over $A[x_1, \dots, x_n], \deg x_i = d_i$ with an Artinian ring (e.g., a field) A. Then the Poincaré series of M is a polynomial with integral coefficients divided by $\prod (1-t^{d_i})$. The standard proof today is an induction on n. Hilbert's original proof made a use of Hilbert's syzygy theorem (a projective resolution of M), which gives more homological information.

Here is a proof by induction on the number n of indeterminates. If $n = 0$, then, since M has finite length, $M_k = 0$ if k is large enough. Next, suppose the theorem is true for $n - 1$ and consider the exact sequence of graded modules (exact degree-wise), with the notation $N(l)_k = N_{k+l}$,

$$0 \to K(-d_n) \to M(-d_n) \overset{x_n} \to M \to C \to 0$$.

Since the length is additive, Poincaré series are also additive. Hence, we have:

$$P(M, t) = -P(K(-d_n), t) + P(M(-d_n), t) - P(C, t)$$.

We can write $P(M(-d_n), t) = t^{d_n} P(M, t)$. Since K is killed by $x_n$, we can regard it as a graded module over $A[x_0, \dots, x_{n-1}]$; the same is true for C. The theorem thus now follows from the inductive hypothesis.

== Chain complex ==
An example of graded vector space is associated to a chain complex, or cochain complex C of vector spaces; the latter takes the form

$$0\to C^0 \stackrel{d_0}{\longrightarrow} C^1\stackrel{d_1}{\longrightarrow} C^2 \stackrel{d_2}{\longrightarrow} \cdots \stackrel{d_{n-1}}{\longrightarrow} C^n \longrightarrow 0.$$

The Hilbert–Poincaré series (here often called the Poincaré polynomial) of the graded vector space $\bigoplus_iC^i$ for this complex is

$$P_C(t) = \sum_{j=0}^n \dim(C^j)t^j.$$

The Hilbert–Poincaré polynomial of the cohomology, with cohomology spaces H^{j} = H^{j}(C), is

$$P_H(t) = \sum_{j=0}^n \dim(H^j)t^j.$$

A famous relation between the two is that there is a polynomial $Q(t)$ with non-negative coefficients, such that $P_C(t) - P_H(t) = (1+t)Q(t).$
