= Poincaré series (modular form) =

In number theory, a Poincaré series is a mathematical series generalizing the classical theta series that is associated to any discrete group of symmetries of a complex domain, possibly of several complex variables. In particular, they generalize classical Eisenstein series. They are named after Henri Poincaré.

If Γ is a finite group acting on a domain D and H(z) is any meromorphic function on D, then one obtains an automorphic function by averaging over Γ:

$$\sum_{\gamma\in\Gamma} H(\gamma(z)).$$

However, if Γ is an infinite discrete group, then additional factors must be introduced in order to assure convergence of such a series. To this end, a Poincaré series is a series of the form

$$\theta_k(z) = \sum_{\gamma\in\Gamma^*} (J_\gamma(z))^k H(\gamma(z))$$

where J_{γ} is the Jacobian determinant of the group element γ, and the asterisk denotes that the summation takes place only over coset representatives yielding distinct terms in the series.

The classical Poincaré series of weight 2k of a Fuchsian group Γ is defined by the series

$$\theta_k(z) = \sum_{\gamma\in\Gamma^*} (cz+d)^{-2k}H\left(\frac{az+b}{cz+d}\right)$$

the summation extending over congruence classes of fractional linear transformations

$$\gamma=\begin{pmatrix}a&b\\c&d\end{pmatrix}$$

belonging to Γ. Choosing H to be a character of the cyclic group of order n, one obtains the so-called Poincaré series of order n:

$$\theta_{k,n}(z) = \sum_{\gamma\in\Gamma^*} (cz+d)^{-2k}\exp\left(2\pi i n\frac{az+b}{cz+d}\right)$$

The latter Poincaré series converges absolutely and uniformly on compact sets (in the upper halfplane), and is a modular form of weight 2k for Γ. Note that, when Γ is the full modular group and n = 0, one obtains the Eisenstein series of weight 2k. In general, the Poincaré series is, for n ≥ 1, a cusp form.
