= Poincaré–Lelong equation =

In mathematics, the Poincaré–Lelong equation, studied by Lelong (1964), is the partial differential equation

$$i\partial\overline\partial u=\rho$$

on a Kähler manifold, where ρ is a positive (1,1)-form.
