= Henri Poincaré =

French mathematician, physicist and engineer (1854–1912)

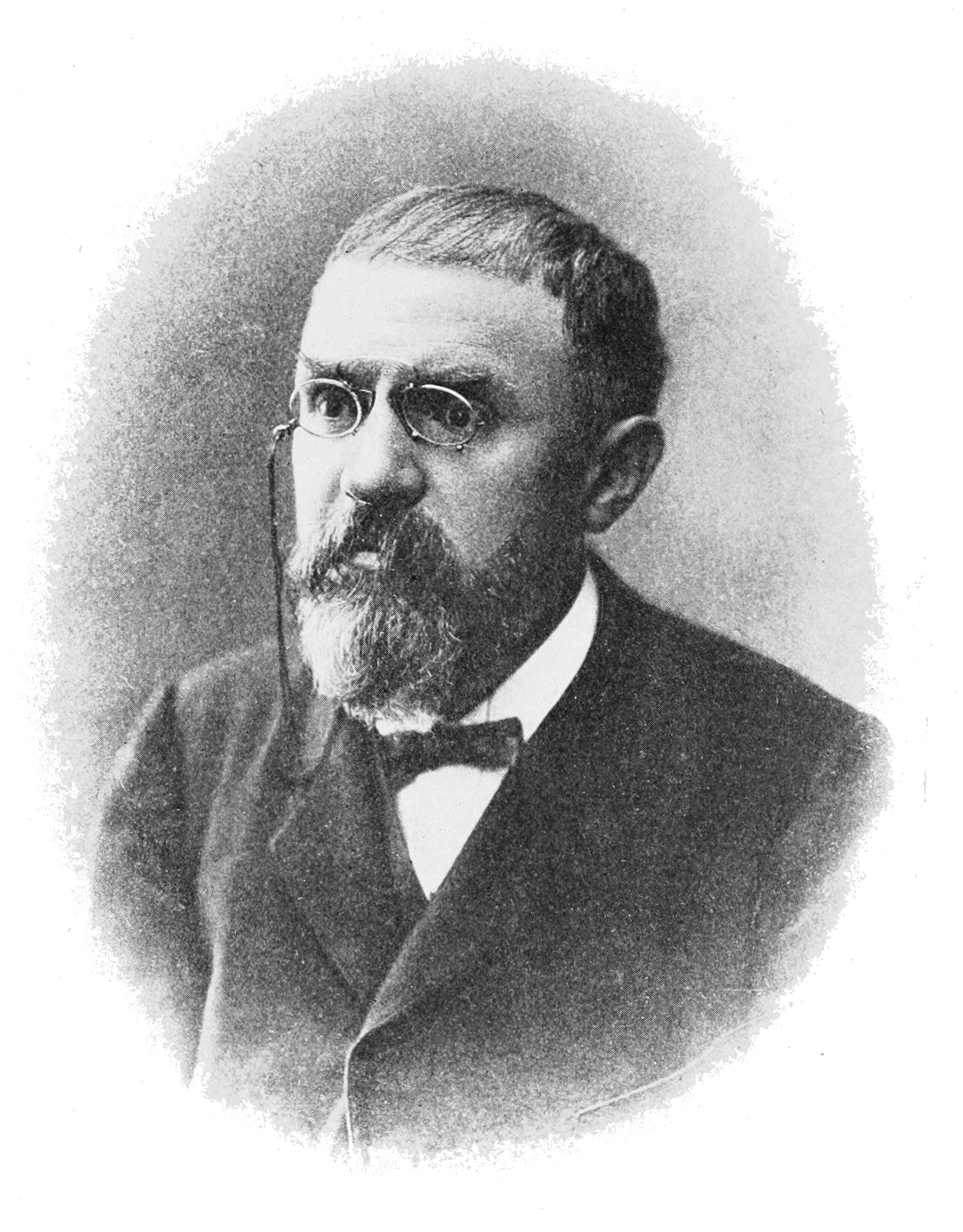
- Born: Jules Henri Poincaré; 29 April 1854; Nancy, Meurthe-et-Moselle, France
- Died: 17 July 1912 (aged 58); Paris, France
- Education: École Polytechnique; École des Mines; University of Paris (Doctorat)
- Known for: List: Epistemic structural realism; Poincaré conjecture; Poincaré–Bendixson theorem; Poincaré–Lindstedt method; Poincaré recurrence theorem; Poincaré–Bjerknes circulation theorem; Poincaré group; Poincaré gauge; Poincaré–Hopf theorem; Poincaré duality; Poincaré–Birkhoff–Witt theorem; Poincaré inequality; Hilbert–Poincaré series; Poincaré series; Poincaré metric; Automorphic form; Coining the term "Betti number"; Brouwer fixed-point theorem; Bifurcation theory; Chaos theory; Dynamical system theory; Dark matter; French historical epistemology; Fundamental group; Gravitational wave; Hairy ball theorem; Homological algebra; Limit cycle; Phase space; Preintuitionism/conventionalism; Predicativism; Qualitative theory of differential equations; Special relativity; Quantum mechanics; Sphere-world; Rotation number; Uniformization theorem; Three-body problem; Topology
- Spouse: Jeanne-Louise Poulain d'Andecy
- Relatives: Raymond Poincaré (cousin); Lucien Poincaré (cousin)
- Awards: RAS Gold Medal (1900); Sylvester Medal (1901); Matteucci Medal (1905); Bolyai Prize (1905); Bruce Medal (1911)
- Scientific career
- Fields: Mathematics; physics
- Workplaces: Corps des Mines; Caen University; University of Paris; Bureau des Longitudes
- Thesis: Sur les propriétés des fonctions définies par les équations différences (1879)
- Doctoral advisor: Charles Hermite
- Doctoral students: Louis Bachelier; Jean Bosler; Édouard Le Roy; Michel Pétrovitch; Dimitrie Pompeiu
- Other notable students: Tobias Dantzig; Théophile de Donder

Notes
- He was an uncle of Pierre Boutroux.

Jules Henri Poincaré (UK: /ˈpwæ̃kɑːreɪ/, US: /ˌpwæ̃kɑːˈreɪ/; French: [ɑ̃ʁi pwɛ̃kaʁe]; 29 April 1854 – 17 July 1912) was a French mathematician, theoretical physicist, engineer, and philosopher of science. He is often described as a polymath, and in mathematics as "The Last Universalist", since he excelled in all fields of the discipline as it existed during his lifetime. He has further been called "the Gauss of modern mathematics". Due to his success in science, along with his influence in philosophy, he has also been called "the philosopher par excellence of modern science".

As a mathematician and physicist, he made many original fundamental contributions to pure and applied mathematics, mathematical physics, and celestial mechanics. In his research on the three-body problem, Poincaré became the first person to discover a chaotic deterministic system which laid the foundations of modern chaos theory. Poincaré is regarded as the creator of the field of algebraic topology, and is further credited with introducing automorphic forms. He also made important contributions to algebraic geometry, number theory, complex analysis and Lie theory. He famously introduced the concept of the Poincaré recurrence theorem, which states that a state will eventually return arbitrarily close to its initial state after a sufficiently long time, which has far-reaching consequences. Early in the 20th century he formulated the Poincaré conjecture, which became, over time, one of the famous unsolved problems in mathematics. It was eventually solved in 2002–2003 by Grigori Perelman. Poincaré popularized the use of non-Euclidean geometry in mathematics as well.

Poincaré made clear the importance of paying attention to the invariance of laws of physics under different transformations, and was the first to present the Lorentz transformations in their modern symmetrical form. Poincaré discovered the remaining relativistic velocity transformations and recorded them in a letter to Hendrik Lorentz in 1905. Thus he obtained perfect invariance of all of Maxwell's equations, an important step in the formulation of the theory of special relativity, for which he is also credited with laying down the foundations, further writing foundational papers in 1905. He first proposed gravitational waves (ondes gravifiques) emanating from a body and propagating at the speed of light as being required by the Lorentz transformations, doing so in 1905. In 1912, he wrote an influential paper which provided a mathematical argument for quantum mechanics. The Poincaré group used in physics and mathematics was named after him, after he introduced the notion of the group.

Poincaré was considered the dominant figure in mathematics and theoretical physics during his time, and was the most respected mathematician of his time, being described as "the living brain of the rational sciences" by mathematician Paul Painlevé. Philosopher Karl Popper regarded Poincaré as the greatest philosopher of science of all time, with Poincaré also originating the conventionalist view in science. He served as the president of the French Academy of Sciences (1906), the president of Société astronomique de France (1901–1903), and twice the president of Société mathématique de France (1886, 1900).

== Life ==
Poincaré was born on 29 April 1854 in Cité Ducale neighborhood, Nancy, Meurthe-et-Moselle, into an influential French family. His father Léon Poincaré (1828–1892) was a professor of medicine at the University of Nancy. His younger sister Aline married the spiritual philosopher Émile Boutroux. Another notable member of Henri's family was his cousin, Raymond Poincaré, a fellow member of the Académie française, who was President of France from 1913 to 1920, and three-time Prime Minister of France between 1913 and 1929.

=== Education ===
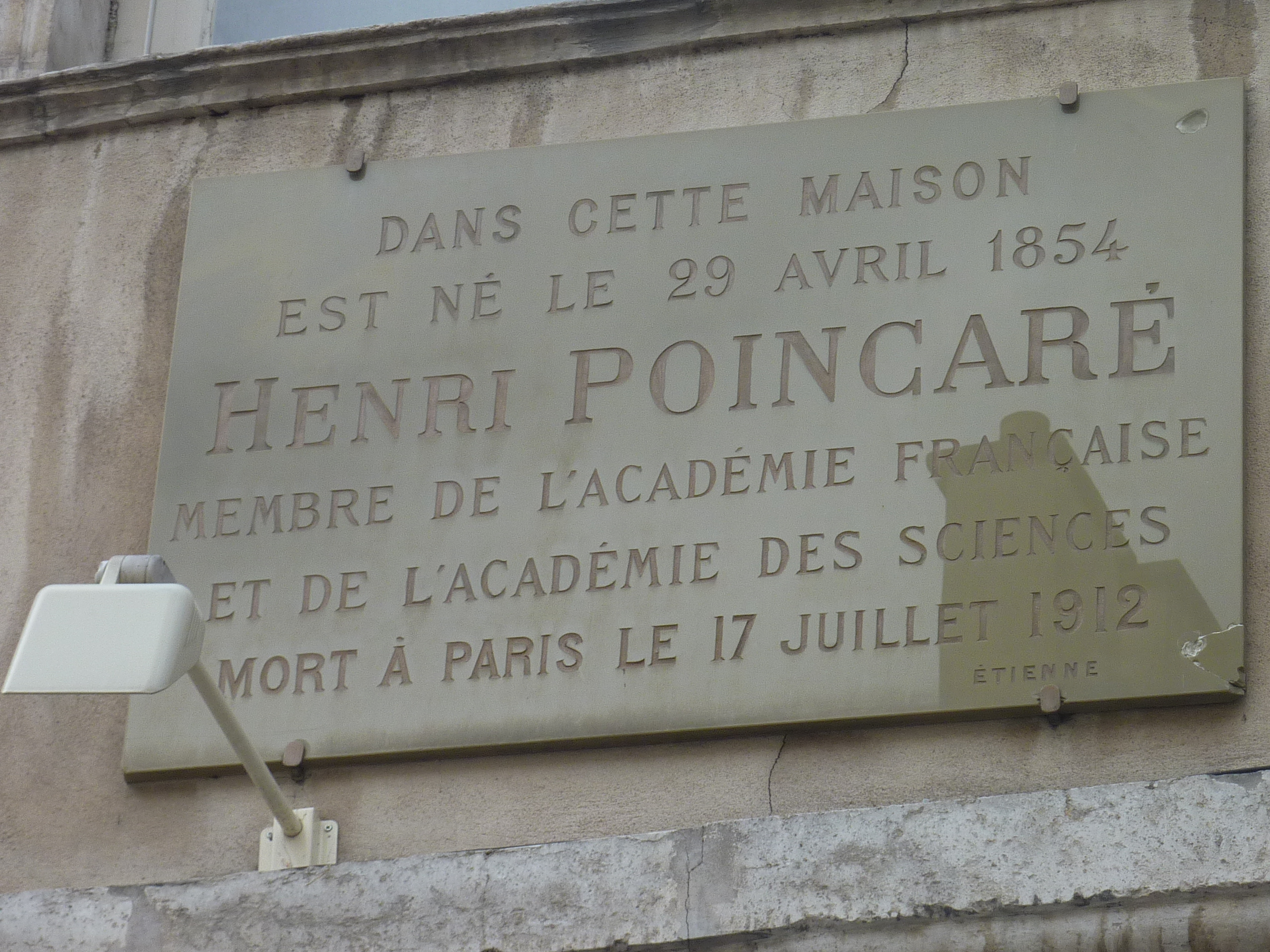
Plaque on the birthplace of Henri Poincaré at house number 117 on the Grande Rue in the city of Nancy

During his childhood he was seriously ill for a time with diphtheria and received special instruction from his mother, Eugénie Launois (1830–1897).

In 1862, Henri entered the Lycée in Nancy (now renamed the Lycée Henri-Poincaré in his honour, along with Henri Poincaré University, also in Nancy). He spent eleven years at the Lycée and during this time he proved to be one of the top students in every topic he studied. He excelled in written composition. His mathematics teacher described him as a "monster of mathematics" and he won first prizes in the concours général, a competition between the top pupils from all the Lycées across France. His poorest subjects were music and physical education, where he was described as "average at best". Poor eyesight and a tendency towards absentmindedness may explain these difficulties. He graduated from the Lycée in 1871 with a baccalauréat in both letters and sciences.

During the Franco-Prussian War of 1870, he served alongside his father in the Ambulance Corps.

Poincaré entered the École Polytechnique as the top qualifier in 1873 and graduated in 1875. There he studied mathematics as a student of Charles Hermite, continuing to excel and publishing his first paper (Démonstration nouvelle des propriétés de l'indicatrice d'une surface) in 1874. From November 1875 to June 1878 he studied at the École des Mines, while continuing the study of mathematics in addition to the mining engineering syllabus, and received the degree of ordinary mining engineer in March 1879.

As a graduate of the École des Mines, he joined the Corps des Mines as an inspector for the Vesoul region in northeast France. He was on the scene of a mining disaster at Magny in August 1879 in which 18 miners died. He carried out the official investigation into the accident.

At the same time, Poincaré was preparing for his Doctorate in Science in mathematics under the supervision of Charles Hermite. His doctoral thesis was in the field of differential equations. It was named Sur les propriétés des fonctions définies par les équations aux différences partielles. Poincaré devised a new way of studying the properties of these equations. He not only faced the question of determining the integral of such equations, but also was the first person to study their general geometric properties. He realised that they could be used to model the behaviour of multiple bodies in free motion within the Solar System. He graduated from the University of Paris in 1879.

=== First scientific achievements ===
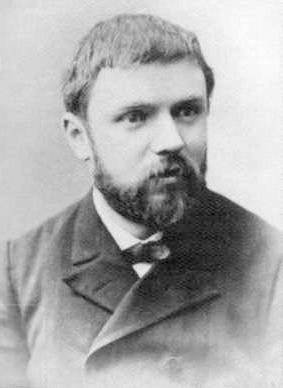
The young Henri Poincaré in 1887 at the age of 33

After receiving his degree, Poincaré began teaching as junior lecturer in mathematics at the University of Caen in Normandy (in December 1879). At the same time he published his first major article concerning the treatment of a class of automorphic functions.

There, in Caen, he met his future wife, Louise Poulain d'Andecy (1857–1934), granddaughter of Isidore Geoffroy Saint-Hilaire and great-granddaughter of Étienne Geoffroy Saint-Hilaire and on 20 April 1881, they married. Together they had four children: Jeanne (born 1887), Yvonne (born 1889), Henriette (born 1891), and Léon (born 1893).

Poincaré immediately established himself among the greatest mathematicians of Europe, attracting the attention of many prominent mathematicians. In 1881 Poincaré was invited to take a teaching position at the Faculty of Sciences of the University of Paris; he accepted the invitation. During the years 1883 to 1897, he taught mathematical analysis in the École Polytechnique.

In 1881–1882, Poincaré created a new branch of mathematics: qualitative theory of differential equations. He showed how it is possible to derive the most important information about the behavior of a family of solutions without having to solve the equation (since this may not always be possible). He successfully used this approach to problems in celestial mechanics and mathematical physics.

In 1896, Poincaré gave a lecture on x-ray emission, newly discovered by the German physicist Wilhelm Röntgen. During the lecture, Poincaré proposed that this emission might be a side effect of fluorescence created by low energy electrons. Henri Becquerel, an expert in fluorescence, was in the audience and was inspired to a series of experiments culminating in the discovery of radioactivity.

=== Career ===
He never fully abandoned his career in the mining administration for mathematics. He worked at the Ministry of Public Services as an engineer in charge of northern railway development from 1881 to 1885. He eventually became chief engineer of the Corps des Mines in 1893 and inspector general in 1910.

Beginning in 1881 and for the rest of his career, he taught at the University of Paris (the Sorbonne). He was initially appointed as the maître de conférences d'analyse (associate professor of analysis). Eventually, he held the chairs of Physical and Experimental Mechanics, Mathematical Physics and Theory of Probability, and Celestial Mechanics and Astronomy.

In 1887, at the young age of 32, Poincaré was elected to the French Academy of Sciences he became its president in 1906, to honorary membership of the Manchester Literary and Philosophical Society, in 1892, and was elected to the Académie française on 5 March 1908.

In 1887, he won Oscar II, King of Sweden's mathematical competition for a resolution of the three-body problem concerning the free motion of multiple orbiting bodies. (See three-body problem section below.)

In 1893, Poincaré joined the French Bureau des Longitudes, which engaged him in the synchronisation of time around the world. In 1897 Poincaré backed an unsuccessful proposal for the decimalisation of circular measure, and hence time and longitude. It was this post which led him to consider the question of establishing international time zones and the synchronisation of time between bodies in relative motion. (See work on relativity section below.)

In 1904, he intervened in the trials of Alfred Dreyfus, attacking the spurious scientific claims regarding evidence brought against Dreyfus.

Poincaré was the President of the Société Astronomique de France (SAF), the French astronomical society, from 1901 to 1903.

==== Students ====
Poincaré had two notable doctoral students at the University of Paris, Louis Bachelier (1900) and Dimitrie Pompeiu (1905).

=== Death ===
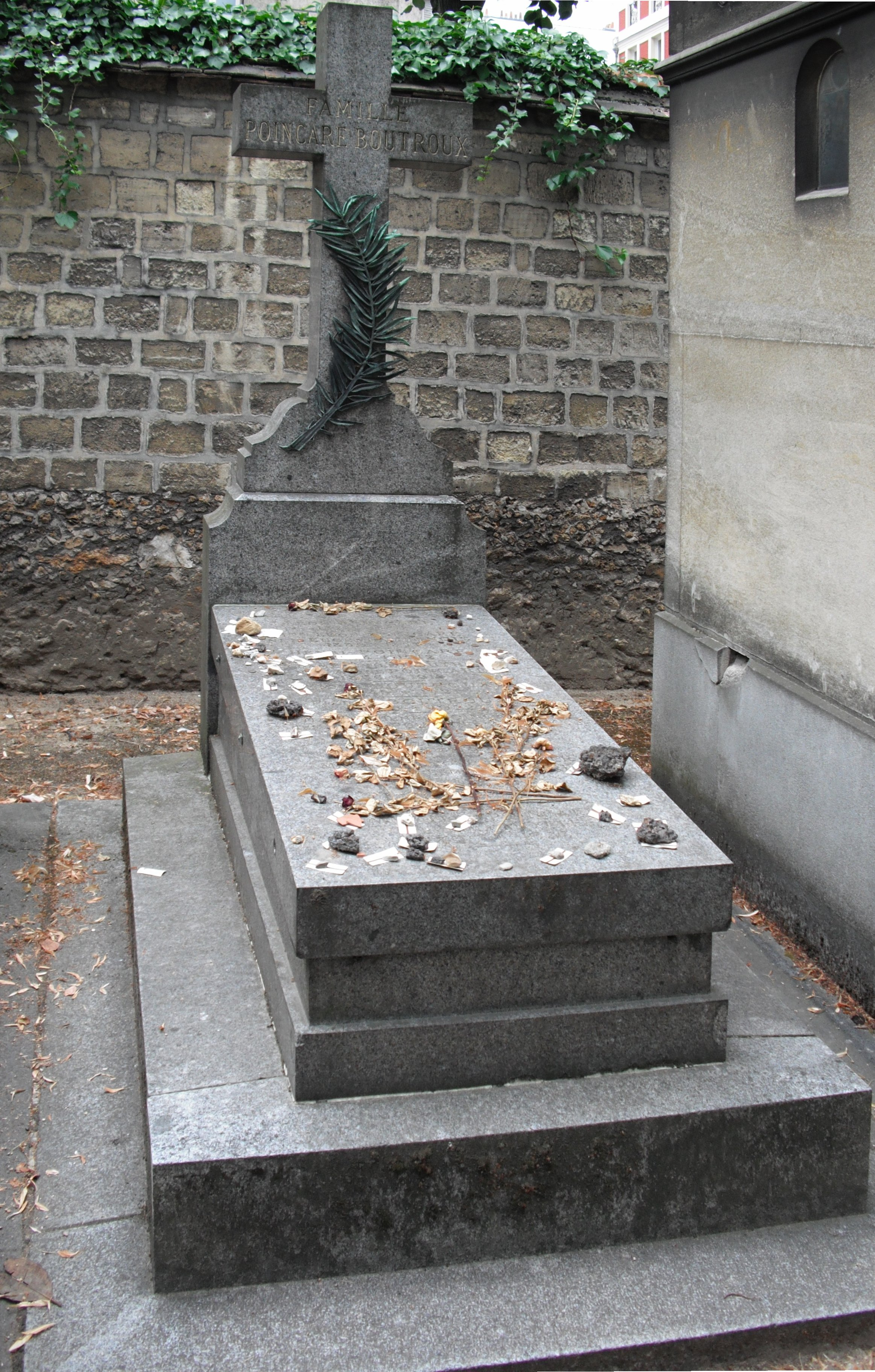
The Poincaré family grave at the Cimetière du Montparnasse

In 1912, Poincaré underwent surgery for a prostate problem and subsequently died from an embolism on 17 July 1912, in Paris. He was 58 years of age. He is buried in the Poincaré family vault in the Cemetery of Montparnasse, Paris, in section 16, close to the Rue Émile-Richard.

A former French Minister of Education, Claude Allègre, proposed in 2004 that Poincaré be reburied in the Panthéon in Paris, which is reserved for French citizens of the highest honour.

== Work ==
=== Summary ===
Poincaré made many contributions to different fields of pure and applied mathematics such as: celestial mechanics, fluid mechanics, optics, electricity, telegraphy, capillarity, elasticity, thermodynamics, potential theory, Quantum mechanics, theory of relativity and physical cosmology.

Among the specific topics he contributed to are the following:

- algebraic topology (a field that Poincaré virtually invented)
- the theory of analytic functions of several complex variables
- the theory of abelian functions
- algebraic geometry
- the Poincaré conjecture, proven in 2003 by Grigori Perelman.
- Poincaré recurrence theorem
- hyperbolic geometry
- Fuchsian groups
- number theory
- the three-body problem
- the theory of diophantine equations
- electromagnetism
- special relativity
- the fundamental group
- In the field of differential equations Poincaré has given many results that are critical for the qualitative theory of differential equations, for example the Poincaré sphere and the Poincaré map.
- Poincaré on "everybody's belief" in the Normal Law of Errors (see normal distribution for an account of that "law")
- Published an influential paper providing a novel mathematical argument in support of quantum mechanics.

=== Three-body problem ===
The problem of finding the general solution to the motion of more than two orbiting bodies in the Solar System had eluded mathematicians since Newton's time. This was known originally as the three-body problem and later the n-body problem, where n is any number of more than two orbiting bodies. The n-body solution was considered very important and challenging at the close of the 19th century. Indeed, in 1887, in honour of his 60th birthday, Oscar II, King of Sweden, advised by Gösta Mittag-Leffler, established a prize for anyone who could find the solution to the problem. The announcement was quite specific:

Given a system of arbitrarily many mass points that attract each according to Newton's law, under the assumption that no two points ever collide, try to find a representation of the coordinates of each point as a series in a variable that is some known function of time and for all of whose values the series converges uniformly.

In case the problem could not be solved, any other important contribution to classical mechanics would then be considered to be prizeworthy. The prize was finally awarded to Poincaré, even though he did not solve the original problem. One of the judges, the distinguished Karl Weierstrass, said, "This work cannot indeed be considered as furnishing the complete solution of the question proposed, but that it is nevertheless of such importance that its publication will inaugurate a new era in the history of celestial mechanics." (The first version of his contribution even contained a serious error; for details see the article by Diacu and the book by Barrow-Green). The version finally printed contained many important ideas which led to the theory of chaos. The problem as stated originally was finally solved by Karl F. Sundman for n = 3 in 1912 and was generalised to the case of n > 3 bodies by Qiudong Wang in the 1990s. The series solutions have very slow convergence. It would take millions of terms to determine the motion of the particles for even very short intervals of time, so they are unusable in numerical work.

=== Work on relativity ===
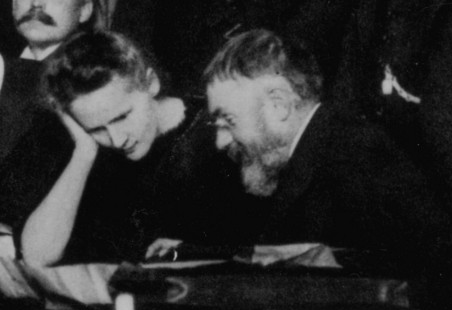
Marie Curie and Poincaré talk at the 1911 Solvay Conference.

==== Local time ====
Poincaré's work at the Bureau des Longitudes on establishing international time zones led him to consider how clocks at rest on the Earth, which would be moving at different speeds relative to absolute space (or the "luminiferous aether"), could be synchronised. At the same time Dutch theorist Hendrik Lorentz was developing Maxwell's theory into a theory of the motion of charged particles ("electrons" or "ions"), and their interaction with radiation. In 1895 Lorentz had introduced an auxiliary quantity (without physical interpretation) called "local time" $t^\prime = t-v x/c^2 \,$ and introduced the hypothesis of length contraction to explain the failure of optical and electrical experiments to detect motion relative to the aether (see Michelson–Morley experiment). Poincaré was a constant interpreter (and sometimes friendly critic) of Lorentz's theory. Poincaré as a philosopher was interested in the "deeper meaning". Thus he interpreted Lorentz's theory and in so doing he came up with many insights that are now associated with special relativity. In The Measure of Time (1898), Poincaré said, "A little reflection is sufficient to understand that all these affirmations have by themselves no meaning. They can have one only as the result of a convention." He also argued that scientists have to set the constancy of the speed of light as a postulate to give physical theories the simplest form. Based on these assumptions he discussed in 1900 Lorentz's "wonderful invention" of local time and remarked that it arose when moving clocks are synchronised by exchanging light signals assumed to travel with the same speed in both directions in a moving frame.

==== Principle of relativity and Lorentz transformations ====
In 1881 Poincaré described hyperbolic geometry in terms of the hyperboloid model, formulating transformations leaving invariant the Lorentz interval $x^2+y^2-z^2=-1$, which makes them mathematically equivalent to the Lorentz transformations in 2+1 dimensions. In addition, Poincaré's other models of hyperbolic geometry (Poincaré disk model, Poincaré half-plane model) as well as the Beltrami–Klein model can be related to the relativistic velocity space (see Gyrovector space).

In 1892 Poincaré developed a mathematical theory of light including polarization. His vision of the action of polarizers and retarders, acting on a sphere representing polarized states, is called the Poincaré sphere. It was shown that the Poincaré sphere possesses an underlying Lorentzian symmetry, by which it can be used as a geometrical representation of Lorentz transformations and velocity additions.

He discussed the "principle of relative motion" in two papers in 1900 and named it the principle of relativity in 1904, according to which no physical experiment can discriminate between a state of uniform motion and a state of rest. In 1905 Poincaré wrote to Lorentz about Lorentz's paper of 1904, which Poincaré described as a "paper of supreme importance". In this letter he pointed out an error Lorentz had made when he had applied his transformation to one of Maxwell's equations, that for charge-occupied space, and also questioned the time dilation factor given by Lorentz. In a second letter to Lorentz, Poincaré gave his own reason why Lorentz's time dilation factor was indeed correct after all—it was necessary to make the Lorentz transformation form a group—and he gave what is now known as the relativistic velocity-addition law. Poincaré later delivered a paper at the meeting of the Academy of Sciences in Paris on 5 June 1905 in which these issues were addressed. In the published version of that he wrote:

The essential point, established by Lorentz, is that the equations of the electromagnetic field are not altered by a certain transformation (which I will call by the name of Lorentz) of the form:

$$x^\prime = k\ell\left(x + \varepsilon t\right)\!,\;t^\prime = k\ell\left(t + \varepsilon x\right)\!,\;y^\prime = \ell y,\;z^\prime = \ell z,\;k = 1/\sqrt{1-\varepsilon^2}.$$

and showed that the arbitrary function $\ell\left(\varepsilon\right)$ must be unity for all $\varepsilon$ (Lorentz had set $\ell = 1$ by a different argument) to make the transformations form a group. In an enlarged version of the paper that appeared in 1906 Poincaré pointed out that the combination $x^2+ y^2+ z^2- c^2t^2$ is invariant. He noted that a Lorentz transformation is a rotation in four-dimensional space about the origin by introducing $ct\sqrt{-1}$ as a fourth imaginary coordinate, and he used an early form of four-vectors. Poincaré did not pursue a four-dimensional reformulation of his new mechanics in 1907, but it was picked up by Hermann Minkowski who worked out the consequences of this notion in a new spacetime mechanics.

==== Mass–energy relation ====
Like others before, Poincaré (1900) discovered a relation between mass and electromagnetic energy. While studying the conflict between the action/reaction principle and Lorentz ether theory, he tried to determine whether the center of gravity still moves with a uniform velocity when electromagnetic fields are included. He noticed that the action/reaction principle does not hold for matter alone, but that the electromagnetic field has its own momentum. Poincaré concluded that the electromagnetic field energy of an electromagnetic wave behaves like a fictitious fluid (fluide fictif) with a mass density of E/c^{2}. If the center of mass frame is defined by both the mass of matter and the mass of the fictitious fluid, and if the fictitious fluid is indestructible—it's neither created or destroyed—then the motion of the center of mass frame remains uniform. But electromagnetic energy can be converted into other forms of energy. So Poincaré assumed that there exists a non-electric energy fluid at each point of space, into which electromagnetic energy can be transformed and which also carries a mass proportional to the energy. In this way, the motion of the center of mass remains uniform. Poincaré said that one should not be too surprised by these assumptions, since they are only mathematical fictions.

However, Poincaré's resolution led to a paradox when changing frames: if a Hertzian oscillator radiates in a certain direction, it will suffer a recoil from the inertia of the fictitious fluid. Poincaré performed a Lorentz boost (to order v/c) to the frame of the moving source. He noted that energy conservation holds in both frames, but that the law of conservation of momentum is violated. This would allow perpetual motion, a notion which he abhorred. The laws of nature would have to be different in the frames of reference, and the relativity principle would not hold. Therefore, he argued that also in this case there has to be another compensating mechanism in the ether.

Poincaré himself came back to this topic in his St. Louis lecture (1904). He rejected the possibility that energy carries mass and criticized his own solution to compensate the above-mentioned problems:

The apparatus will recoil as if it were a cannon and the projected energy a ball, and that contradicts the principle of Newton, since our present projectile has no mass; it is not matter, it is energy. [..] Shall we say that the space which separates the oscillator from the receiver and which the disturbance must traverse in passing from one to the other, is not empty, but is filled not only with ether, but with air, or even in inter-planetary space with some subtile, yet ponderable fluid; that this matter receives the shock, as does the receiver, at the moment the energy reaches it, and recoils, when the disturbance leaves it? That would save Newton's principle, but it is not true. If the energy during its propagation remained always attached to some material substratum, this matter would carry the light along with it and Fizeau has shown, at least for the air, that there is nothing of the kind. Michelson and Morley have since confirmed this. We might also suppose that the motions of matter proper were exactly compensated by those of the ether; but that would lead us to the same considerations as those made a moment ago. The principle, if thus interpreted, could explain anything, since whatever the visible motions we could imagine hypothetical motions to compensate them. But if it can explain anything, it will allow us to foretell nothing; it will not allow us to choose between the various possible hypotheses, since it explains everything in advance. It therefore becomes useless.

In the above quote he refers to the Hertz assumption of total aether entrainment that was falsified by the Fizeau experiment but that experiment does indeed show that light is partially "carried along" with a substance. Finally in 1908 he revisits the problem and ends with abandoning the principle of reaction altogether in favor of supporting a solution based in the inertia of aether itself.

But we have seen above that Fizeau's experiment does not permit of our retaining the theory of Hertz; it is necessary therefore to adopt the theory of Lorentz, and consequently to renounce the principle of reaction.

He also discussed two other unexplained effects: (1) non-conservation of mass implied by Lorentz's variable mass $\gamma m$, Abraham's theory of variable mass and Kaufmann's experiments on the mass of fast moving electrons and (2) the non-conservation of energy in the radium experiments of Marie Curie.

It was Albert Einstein's concept of mass–energy equivalence (1905) that a body losing energy as radiation or heat was losing mass of amount m = E/c^{2} that resolved Poincaré's paradox, without using any compensating mechanism within the ether. The Hertzian oscillator loses mass in the emission process, and momentum is conserved in any frame. However, concerning Poincaré's solution of the Center of Gravity problem, Einstein noted that Poincaré's formulation and his own from 1906 were mathematically equivalent.

==== Gravitational waves ====
In 1905 Poincaré first proposed gravitational waves (ondes gravifiques) emanating from a body and propagating at the speed of light. He wrote:

It has become important to examine this hypothesis more closely and in particular to ask in what ways it would require us to modify the laws of gravitation. That is what I have tried to determine; at first I was led to assume that the propagation of gravitation is not instantaneous, but happens with the speed of light.

==== Poincaré and Einstein ====
Einstein's first paper on relativity was published three months after Poincaré's short paper, but before Poincaré's longer version. Einstein relied on the principle of relativity to derive the Lorentz transformations and used a similar clock synchronisation procedure (Einstein synchronisation) to the one that Poincaré (1900) had described, but Einstein's paper was remarkable in that it contained no references at all. Poincaré never acknowledged Einstein's work on special relativity. However, Einstein expressed sympathy with Poincaré's outlook obliquely in a letter to Hans Vaihinger on 3 May 1919, when Einstein considered Vaihinger's general outlook to be close to his own and Poincaré's to be close to Vaihinger's. In public, Einstein acknowledged Poincaré posthumously in the text of a lecture in 1921 titled "Geometrie und Erfahrung (Geometry and Experience)" in connection with non-Euclidean geometry, but not in connection with special relativity. A few years before his death, Einstein commented on Poincaré as being one of the pioneers of relativity, saying "Lorentz had already recognized that the transformation named after him is essential for the analysis of Maxwell's equations, and Poincaré deepened this insight still further ....".

==== Assessments on Poincaré and relativity ====
Poincaré's work in the development of special relativity is well recognised, though most historians stress that despite many similarities with Einstein's work, the two had very different research agendas and interpretations of the work. Poincaré developed a similar physical interpretation of local time and noticed the connection to signal velocity, but contrary to Einstein he continued to use the ether-concept in his papers and argued that clocks at rest in the ether show the "true" time, and moving clocks show the local time. So Poincaré tried to keep the relativity principle in accordance with classical concepts, while Einstein developed a mathematically equivalent kinematics based on the new physical concepts of the relativity of space and time.

While this is the view of most historians, a minority go much further, such as E. T. Whittaker, who held that Poincaré and Lorentz were the true discoverers of relativity.

=== Algebra and number theory ===
Poincaré introduced group theory to physics, and was the first to study the group of Lorentz transformations. He also made major contributions to the theory of discrete groups and their representations.

=== Topology ===
Topological transformation of a mug into a torus

The subject is clearly defined by Felix Klein in his "Erlangen Program" (1872): the geometry invariants of arbitrary continuous transformation, a kind of geometry. The term "topology" was introduced, as suggested by Johann Benedict Listing, instead of previously used "Analysis situs". Some important concepts were introduced by Enrico Betti and Bernhard Riemann. But the foundation of this science, for a space of any dimension, was created by Poincaré. His first article on this topic appeared in 1894.

His research in geometry led to the abstract topological definition of homotopy and homology. He also first introduced the basic concepts and invariants of combinatorial topology, such as Betti numbers and the fundamental group. Poincaré proved a formula relating the number of edges, vertices and faces of n-dimensional polyhedron (the Euler–Poincaré theorem) and gave the first precise formulation of the intuitive notion of dimension.

=== Astronomy and celestial mechanics ===
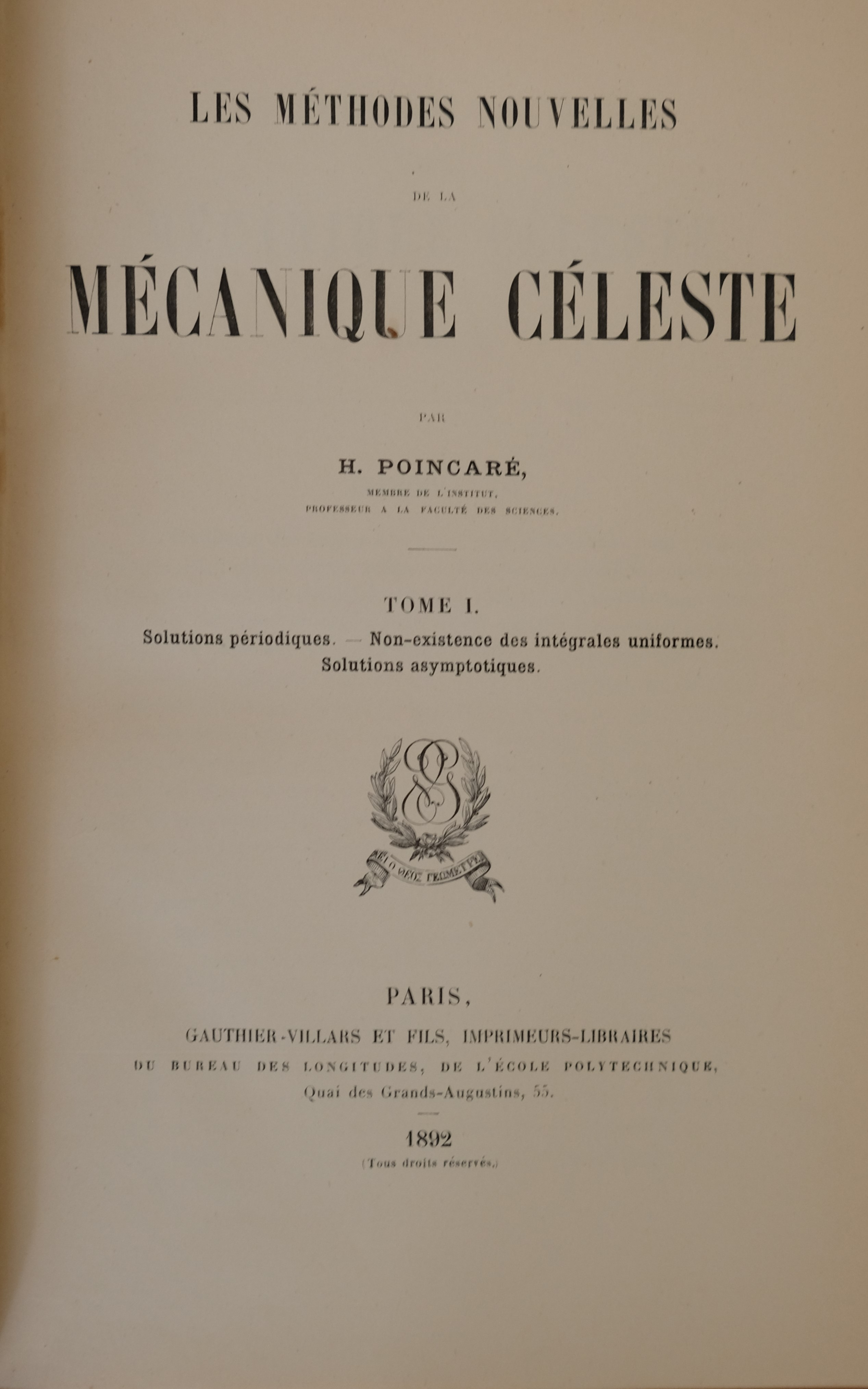
Title page to volume I of Les Méthodes Nouvelles de la Mécanique Céleste (1892)

Chaotic motion in three-body problem (computer simulation)

Poincaré published two now classical monographs, "New Methods of Celestial Mechanics" (1892–1899) and "Lectures on Celestial Mechanics" (1905–1910). In them, he successfully applied the results of their research to the problem of the motion of three bodies and studied in detail the behavior of solutions (frequency, stability, asymptotic, and so on). They introduced the small parameter method, fixed points, integral invariants, variational equations, the convergence of the asymptotic expansions. Generalizing a theory of Bruns (1887), Poincaré showed that the three-body problem is not integrable. In other words, the general solution of the three-body problem can not be expressed in terms of algebraic and transcendental functions through unambiguous coordinates and velocities of the bodies. His work in this area was the first major achievement in celestial mechanics since Isaac Newton.

These monographs include an idea of Poincaré, which later became the basis for mathematical "chaos theory" (see, in particular, the Poincaré recurrence theorem) and the general theory of dynamical systems. Poincaré authored important works on astronomy for the equilibrium figures of a gravitating rotating fluid. He introduced the important concept of bifurcation points and proved the existence of equilibrium figures such as the non-ellipsoids, including ring-shaped and pear-shaped figures, and their stability. For this discovery, Poincaré received the Gold Medal of the Royal Astronomical Society (1900).

=== Differential equations and mathematical physics ===
After defending his doctoral thesis on the study of singular points of the system of differential equations, Poincaré wrote a series of memoirs under the title "On curves defined by differential equations" (1881–1882). In these articles, he built a new branch of mathematics, called "qualitative theory of differential equations". Poincaré showed that even if the differential equation can not be solved in terms of known functions, yet from the very form of the equation, a wealth of information about the properties and behavior of the solutions can be found. In particular, Poincaré investigated the nature of the trajectories of the integral curves in the plane, gave a classification of singular points (saddle, focus, center, node), introduced the concept of a limit cycle and the loop index, and showed that the number of limit cycles is always finite, except for some special cases. Poincaré also developed a general theory of integral invariants and solutions of the variational equations. For the finite-difference equations, he created a new direction – the asymptotic analysis of the solutions. He applied all these achievements to study practical problems of mathematical physics and celestial mechanics, and the methods used were the basis of its topological works.

The singular points of the integral curves

Saddle

Focus

Center

Node

== Character ==
Photographic portrait of H. Poincaré by Henri Manuel

Poincaré's work habits have been compared to a bee flying from flower to flower. Poincaré was interested in the way his mind worked; he studied his habits and gave a talk about his observations in 1908 at the Institute of General Psychology in Paris. He linked his way of thinking to how he made several discoveries.

The mathematician Darboux claimed he was un intuitif (an intuitive), arguing that this is demonstrated by the fact that he worked so often by visual representation. Jacques Hadamard wrote that Poincaré's research demonstrated marvelous clarity and Poincaré himself wrote that he believed that logic was not a way to invent but a way to structure ideas and that logic limits ideas.

=== Toulouse's characterisation ===
Poincaré's mental organisation was interesting not only to Poincaré himself but also to Édouard Toulouse, a psychologist of the Psychology Laboratory of the School of Higher Studies in Paris. Toulouse wrote a book entitled Henri Poincaré (1910). In it, he discussed Poincaré's regular schedule:

- He worked during the same times each day in short periods of time. He undertook mathematical research for four hours a day, between 10 a.m. and noon then again from 5 p.m. to 7 p.m.. He would read articles in journals later in the evening.
- His normal work habit was to solve a problem completely in his head, then commit the completed problem to paper.
- He was ambidextrous and nearsighted.
- His ability to visualise what he heard proved particularly useful when he attended lectures, since his eyesight was so poor that he could not see properly what the lecturer wrote on the blackboard.

These abilities were offset to some extent by his shortcomings:

- He was physically clumsy and artistically inept.
- He was always in a rush and disliked going back for changes or corrections.
- He never spent a long time on a problem since he believed that the subconscious would continue working on the problem while he consciously worked on another problem.

In addition, Toulouse stated that most mathematicians worked from principles already established while Poincaré started from basic principles each time.

His method of thinking is well summarised as:

Habitué à négliger les détails et à ne regarder que les cimes, il passait de l'une à l'autre avec une promptitude surprenante et les faits qu'il découvrait se groupant d'eux-mêmes autour de leur centre étaient instantanément et automatiquement classés dans sa mémoire (accustomed to neglecting details and to looking only at mountain tops, he went from one peak to another with surprising rapidity, and the facts he discovered, clustering around their center, were instantly and automatically pigeonholed in his memory).

— Belliver (1956)

== Publications ==
- Leçons sur la théorie mathématique de la lumière (in French). Paris: Carrè. 1889.
- Solutions periodiques, non-existence des integrales uniformes, solutions asymptotiques (in French). Vol. 1. Paris: Gauthier-Villars. 1892.
- Methodes de mm. Newcomb, Gylden, Lindstedt et Bohlin (in French). Vol. 2. Paris: Gauthier-Villars. 1893.
- Oscillations électriques (in French). Paris: Carrè. 1894.
- Invariants integraux, solutions periodiques du deuxieme genre, solutions doublement asymptotiques (in French). Vol. 3. Paris: Gauthier-Villars. 1899.
- Valeur de la science (in French). Paris: Flammarion. 1900.
- Electricité et optique (in French). Paris: Carrè & Naud. 1901.
- Science et l'hypothèse (in French). Paris: Flammarion. 1902.
- Thermodynamique (in French). Paris: Gauthier-Villars. 1908.
- Dernières pensées (in French). Paris: Flammarion. 1913.
- Science et méthode. London: Nelson and Sons. 1914.

== Legacy ==
Poincaré is credited with laying the foundations of special relativity, with some arguing that he should be credited with its creation. He is said to have "dominated the mathematics and the theoretical physics of his time", and that "he was without a doubt the most admired mathematician while he was alive, and he remains today one of the world's most emblematic scientific figures." Poincaré is regarded as a "universal specialist", as he refined celestial mechanics, he progressed nearly all parts of mathematics of his time, including creating new subjects, is a father of special relativity, participated in all the great debates of his time in physics, was a major actor in the great epistemological debates of his day in relation to philosophy of science, and Poincaré was the one who investigated the 1879 Magny shaft firedamp explosion as an engineer. He has also been credited as one of the founders of philosophy of science as an academic discipline, and his work profoundly shaped both the philosophy of science and the philosophy of mathematics. Due to the breadth of his research, Poincaré was the only member to be elected to every section of the French Academy of Sciences of the time, those being geometry, mechanics, physics, astronomy and navigation.

Physicist Henri Becquerel nominated Poincaré for a Nobel Prize in 1904, as Becquerel took note that "Poincaré's mathematical and philosophical genius surveyed all of physics and was among those that contributed most to human progress by giving researchers a solid basis for their journeys into the unknown." After his death, he was praised by many intellectual figures of his time, as the author Marie Bonaparte wrote to his widowed wife Louise that "He was – as you know better than anyone – not only the greatest thinker, the most powerful genius of our time – but also a deep and incomparable heart; and having been close to him remains the precious memory of a whole life." Writing in 1914, Bertrand Russell called him, "by general agreement," the most eminent scientist of his generation, and observed that the variety of his subjects meant no one person could critically assess all of his work." As a result, he is widely regarded as one of the greatest mathematicians and scientists of all time.

== Honours ==
Awards

- Oscar II, King of Sweden's mathematical competition (1887)
- Foreign member of the Royal Netherlands Academy of Arts and Sciences (1897)
- American Philosophical Society (1899)
- Gold Medal of the Royal Astronomical Society of London (1900)
- Commander of the Legion of Honour (1903)
- Bolyai Prize (1905)
- Matteucci Medal (1905)
- French Academy of Sciences (1906)
- Académie française (1909)
- Bruce Medal (1911)

Named after him

- Institut Henri Poincaré (mathematics and theoretical physics centre)
- Maison Poincaré, a mathematics museum in the 5th arrondissement of Paris
- Poincaré Prize (Mathematical Physics International Prize)
- Annales Henri Poincaré (Scientific Journal)
- Poincaré Seminar (nicknamed "Bourbaphy")
- The crater Poincaré on the Moon
- Asteroid 2021 Poincaré
- List of things named after Henri Poincaré

Henri Poincaré did not receive the Nobel Prize in Physics, but he had influential advocates like Henri Becquerel or committee member Gösta Mittag-Leffler. Of the 58 nominations for the 1910 Nobel Prize, 34 named Poincaré. Nominators included Nobel laureates Hendrik Lorentz and Pieter Zeeman (both of 1902), Marie Curie (of 1903), Albert Michelson (of 1907), Gabriel Lippmann (of 1908) and Guglielmo Marconi (of 1909). Several of those who nominated him pointed out that the greatest problem was to name a specific discovery, invention, or technique.

== Philosophy ==
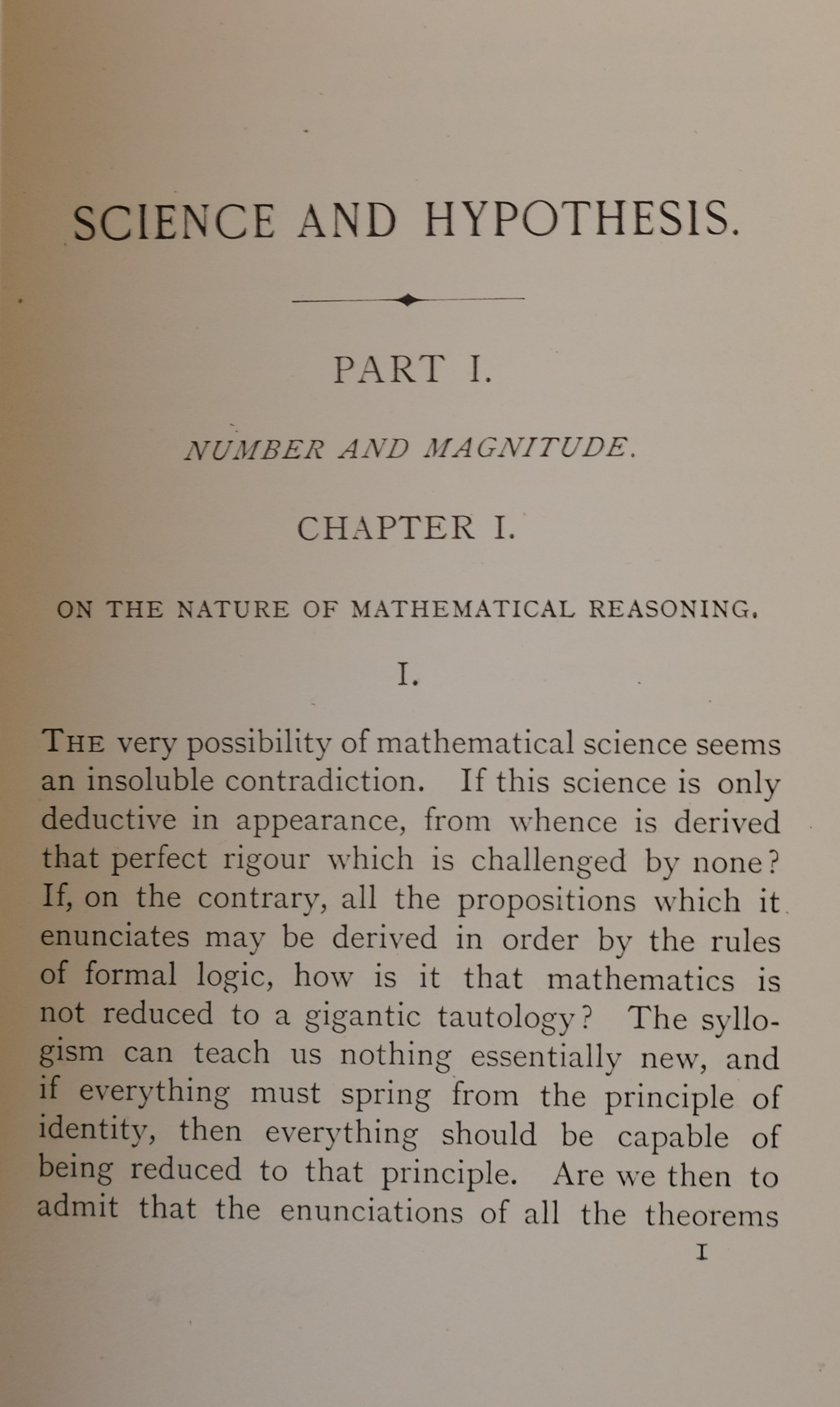
First page of Science and hypothesis (1905)

Poincaré had philosophical views opposite to those of Bertrand Russell and Gottlob Frege, who believed that mathematics was a branch of logic. Poincaré strongly disagreed, claiming that intuition was the life of mathematics. Poincaré gives an interesting point of view in his 1902 book Science and Hypothesis:

For a superficial observer, scientific truth is beyond the possibility of doubt; the logic of science is infallible, and if the scientists are sometimes mistaken, this is only from their mistaking its rule.

Poincaré believed that arithmetic is synthetic. He argued that Peano's axioms cannot be proven non-circularly with the principle of induction (Murzi, 1998), therefore concluding that arithmetic is a priori synthetic and not analytic. Poincaré then went on to say that mathematics cannot be deduced from logic since it is not analytic. His views were similar to those of Immanuel Kant (Kolak, 2001, Folina 1992). He strongly opposed Cantorian set theory, objecting to its use of impredicative definitions. Moreover, in La logique de l'infini, Poincaré extended this criticism to Ernst Zermelo's axiomatization of set theory, arguing that Zermelo had not demonstrated that the axioms in his system were free from contradiction, and still required a prior intuition of Menge (set).

However, Poincaré did not share Kantian views in all branches of philosophy and mathematics. For example, in geometry, Poincaré believed that the structure of non-Euclidean space can be known analytically. Poincaré held that convention plays an important role in physics. His view (and some later, more extreme versions of it) came to be known as "conventionalism". Poincaré believed that Newton's first law was not empirical but is a conventional framework assumption for mechanics (Gargani, 2012). He also believed that the geometry of physical space is conventional. He considered examples in which either the geometry of the physical fields or gradients of temperature can be changed, either describing a space as non-Euclidean measured by rigid rulers, or as a Euclidean space where the rulers are expanded or shrunk by a variable heat distribution. However, Poincaré thought that we were so accustomed to Euclidean geometry that we would prefer to change the physical laws to save Euclidean geometry rather than shift to non-Euclidean physical geometry.

=== Free will ===
Poincaré's famous lectures before the Société de Psychologie in Paris (published as Science and Hypothesis, The Value of Science, and Science and Method) were cited by Jacques Hadamard as the source for the idea that creativity and invention consist of two mental stages, first random combinations of possible solutions to a problem, followed by a critical evaluation.

Although he most often spoke of a deterministic universe, Poincaré said that the subconscious generation of new possibilities involves chance.

It is certain that the combinations which present themselves to the mind in a kind of sudden illumination after a somewhat prolonged period of unconscious work are generally useful and fruitful combinations... all the combinations are formed as a result of the automatic action of the subliminal ego, but those only which are interesting find their way into the field of consciousness... A few only are harmonious, and consequently at once useful and beautiful, and they will be capable of affecting the geometrician's special sensibility I have been speaking of; which, once aroused, will direct our attention upon them, and will thus give them the opportunity of becoming conscious... In the subliminal ego, on the contrary, there reigns what I would call liberty, if one could give this name to the mere absence of discipline and to disorder born of chance.

Poincaré's two stages—random combinations followed by selection—became the basis for Daniel Dennett's two-stage model of free will.

== Bibliography ==
=== Poincaré's writings in English translation ===
Popular writings on the philosophy of science:

- Poincaré, Henri (1902–1908). The Foundations of Science. New York: Science Press.; reprinted in 1921; this book includes the English translations of Science and Hypothesis (1902), The Value of Science (1905), Science and Method (1908).
- 1905. Science and Hypothesis., The Walter Scott Publishing Co.
- 1906. The End of Matter., Athenæum
- 1913. "The New Mechanics", The Monist, Vol. XXIII.
- 1913. "The Relativity of Space", The Monist, Vol. XXIII.
- 1913. Last Essays (Reprint ed.). New York: Dover. 1963.
- 1956. Chance. In James R. Newman, ed., The World of Mathematics (4 Vols).
- 1958. The Value of Science, New York: Dover.

On algebraic topology:

- 1895. "Analysis Situs" (PDF). Archived (PDF) from the original on 27 March 2012.. The first systematic study of topology.

On celestial mechanics:

- 1890. Poincaré, Henri (2017). The three-body problem and the equations of dynamics: Poincaré's foundational work on dynamical systems theory. Translated by Popp, Bruce D. Cham, Switzerland: Springer International Publishing. ISBN 978-3-319-52898-4.
- 1892–99. New Methods of Celestial Mechanics, 3 vols. English trans., 1967. ISBN 1-56396-117-2.
- 1905. "The Capture Hypothesis of J. J. See", The Monist, Vol. XV.
- 1905–10. Lessons of Celestial Mechanics.

On the philosophy of mathematics:

- Ewald, William B., ed., 1996. From Kant to Hilbert: A Source Book in the Foundations of Mathematics, 2 vols. Oxford Univ. Press. Contains the following works by Poincaré:
  - 1894, "On the Nature of Mathematical Reasoning", 972–981.
  - 1898, "On the Foundations of Geometry", 982–1011.
  - 1900, "Intuition and Logic in Mathematics", 1012–1020.
  - 1905–06, "Mathematics and Logic, I–III", 1021–1070.
  - 1910, "On Transfinite Numbers", 1071–1074.
- 1905. "The Principles of Mathematical Physics", The Monist, Vol. XV.
- 1910. "The Future of Mathematics", The Monist, Vol. XX.
- 1910. "Mathematical Creation", The Monist, Vol. XX.

Other:

- 1904. Maxwell's Theory and Wireless Telegraphy, New York, McGraw Publishing Company.
- 1905. "The New Logics", The Monist, Vol. XV.
- 1905. "The Latest Efforts of the Logisticians", The Monist, Vol. XV.

Exhaustive bibliography of English translations:

- 1892–2017. "Henri Poincaré Papers". Archived from the original on 1 August 2020..

== See also ==
=== Concepts ===
- Poincaré–Andronov–Hopf bifurcation
- Poincaré complex – an abstraction of the singular chain complex of a closed, orientable manifold
- Poincaré duality
- Poincaré disk model
- Poincaré expansion
- Poincaré gauge
- Poincaré group
- Poincaré half-plane model
- Poincaré homology sphere
- Poincaré inequality
- Poincaré lemma
- Poincaré map
- Poincaré residue
- Poincaré series (modular form)
- Poincaré space
- Poincaré metric
- Poincaré plot
- Poincaré polynomial
- Poincaré series
- Poincaré sphere
- Poincaré–Einstein synchronisation
- Poincaré–Lelong equation
- Poincaré–Lindstedt method
- Poincaré–Lindstedt perturbation theory
- Poincaré–Steklov operator
- Euler–Poincaré characteristic
- Neumann–Poincaré operator
- Reflecting Function

=== Theorems ===
Here is a list of theorems proved by Poincaré:

- Poincaré's recurrence theorem: certain systems will, after a sufficiently long but finite time, return to a state very close to the initial state.
- Poincaré–Bendixson theorem: a statement about the long-term behaviour of orbits of continuous dynamical systems on the plane, cylinder, or two-sphere.
- Poincaré–Hopf theorem: a generalization of the hairy-ball theorem, which states that there is no smooth vector field on a sphere having no sources or sinks.
- Poincaré–Lefschetz duality theorem: a version of Poincaré duality in geometric topology, applying to a manifold with boundary
- Poincaré separation theorem: gives the upper and lower bounds of eigenvalues of a real symmetric matrix B'AB that can be considered as the orthogonal projection of a larger real symmetric matrix A onto a linear subspace spanned by the columns of B.
- Poincaré–Birkhoff theorem: every area-preserving, orientation-preserving homeomorphism of an annulus that rotates the two boundaries in opposite directions has at least two fixed points.
- Poincaré–Birkhoff–Witt theorem: an explicit description of the universal enveloping algebra of a Lie algebra.
- Poincaré–Bjerknes circulation theorem: theorem about a conservation of quantity for the rotating frame.
- Poincaré conjecture (now a theorem): Every simply connected, closed 3-manifold is homeomorphic to the 3-sphere.
- Poincaré–Miranda theorem: a generalization of the intermediate value theorem to n dimensions.

=== Other ===
- Brouwer fixed-point theorem
- French epistemology
- History of special relativity
- Institut Henri Poincaré, Paris
- List of things named after Henri Poincaré
- Relativity priority dispute

Cultural offices
Preceded by Sully Prudhomme	Seat 24; Académie française 1908–1912	Succeeded by Alfred Capus
