= Friedrich Wilhelm Bessel Research Award =

Friedrich Wilhem Bessel Research Award
- Awarded for: International researchers
- Country: Germany
- Presented by: Alexander von Humboldt Foundation
- Reward: 60,000 euros
- First award: 2001
- Website: www.humboldt-foundation.de/en/apply/sponsorship-programmes/friedrich-wilhelm-bessel-research-award

The Friedrich Wilhelm Bessel Research Award (German: Friedrich Wilhelm Bessel-Forschungspreis) is a recognition from the Alexander von Humboldt Foundation to academic researchers who developed projects and worked in German institutions.

The award was named after the German astronomer and mathematician Friedrich Wilhelm Bessel and funded by the German Federal Ministry of Research, Technology and Space and the Germany’s Federal Ministry of Education and Research.

Annually, the award is given to approximately 20 international researcher who concluded their PhD in less than 18 years ago. The researcher can be from multiple areas, like mathematics, physics, biology and others. The winners also receive 60,000 euros and are invited to conduct a project of their choice at a German institution.

== Winners ==
=== October 2001 ===
- Peter J. Hirschfeld
- Srinivasan Ramakrishnan
- James Retallack
- Susanta Mahapatra
- Sutanu Sarkar
- Stefan K. Estreicher
- Ulrike Diebold
- Eugenii Shustin
- Martin Dufwenberg
- Naveen Garg
- Eduard Boos
- Ulrich Meierfrankenfeld
- Giacomo de Angelis
- Richard A. Dluhy
- Stephen High
- Askold Ivantchik

=== March 2002 ===
- Yaroslav Shramko
- Kalyanmoy Deb
- Victor Kozlov
- Andrey Sarantsev
- Krassimir Danov
- Eric Suraud
- Olga V. Boltalina

=== October 2002 ===
- Pietro U. Dini
- Vadapalli Chandrasekhar
- Mark A. Adams
- Craig Darrian Roberts
- Nir Davidson
- Wolfram Michael Kürschner
- Galen V. Bodenhausen
- Nicholas Pinter
- Grahame Alexander Blair
- Vladimir Shabaev

=== March 2003 ===
- Igor L. Fedushkin
- Branislav Jeremic
- Hartmut Lücke
- Pim Martens
- Christoph U. Keller
- Andrew James Elliot
- Hsien-Kuei Hwang
- Julio Fernando Navarro
- Sotiris Xantheas
- Wenjun Zhang
- Vadim Kamenetsky
- Igor Ivanovich Potemkin

=== March 2004 ===
- Alexander O. Govorov
- Sven Beckert
- Nicola Tirelli
- Ruiqin Zhang

=== October 2004 ===
- Alvaro Pascual-Leone
- Luis M. Chiappe
- Martin Freer
- Mikhail Ivanov
- Daniel M. Sigman
- David S. Citrin
- Guillermo Bazan
- João B. Pesquero

=== March 2005 ===
- Yan V. Fyodorov
- Martin Gruebele
- Jairton Dupont
- Steen Hannestad
- Ilan Marek
- Andrea Cimatti
- Roland Bürgmann
- Peter Ulric Tse
- Angel Rubio
- Navin Khaneja
- Mark E. Tuckerman

=== October 2005 ===
- Steve Wood
- Charles Spence
- Christos Mantzoros
- Craig M. Crews
- Yanyao Jiang
- Cary B. Forest

=== March 2006 ===
- Xiaoyang Zhu
- Lynda Catherine Brinson
- Sean C. Smith
- Zhibin Guan
- Bianca M. Poggianti
- Juan Pablo Paz
- Jun Ye
- Mary Mullins
- Benjamin D. Wandelt
- Ashutosh Sharma
- Ran Nathan
- Changchang Xi

=== September 2006 ===
- Lane A. Hemaspaandra
- Dmitriy A. Funk
- Michael Granato
- Grigory Mikhalkin
- Lydéric Bocquet
- Raymond Wai Ho Yeung

=== March 2007 ===
- Wenjian Liu
- Lorenzo Perilli
- Abdulmotaleb El Saddik
- Nektarios Tavernarakis
- Polly Arnold
- Shude Mao
- Srikanth Iyengar
- Werner Vogelsang

=== October 2007 ===
- Ralf Rapp
- Ruben Minasian
- Ulrike Luise Tillmann
- Frantisek Stepanek
- Mathew D. Penrose
- Edith Hemaspaandra
- Adrian Constantin
- Guy D. Moore

=== April 2008 ===
- Sandeep Kumar Shukla
- Paul Chirik

=== October 2008 ===
- Valery Kiryukhin
- Stephan Roche
- Iain Stewart
- Daniel Mindiola
- Hans Ringström

=== March 2009 ===
- Frieder Jäkle
- A. A. Mamun
- Joris Koene
- Zuzanna Siwy
- Wilhelm T.S. Huck
- Guoxiang Peng
- Lutz Lampe
- Sergey Saveliev
- Victor Gurarie

=== October 2009 ===
- Troy W. Margrie
- Markus Aspelmeyer
- Demian M. Saffer
- Alison L. Bartosik
- Ulisse Stefanell
- Carsten Wiuf

=== March 2010 ===
- Alberto Mario Damiani
- Andrew Gurtovenko
- Paul Braun
- Bing Bing Jia
- José del Valle

=== October 2010 ===
- Alejandro G. Vigo
- Federico Rosei
- Ajayan Vinu
- Dirk Schulze-Makuch
- Adrian Langer
- Musa Wenkosi Dube

=== March 2011 ===
- Sandra Lorena Lopez Varela
- Eli Barkai
- Brian C. Freeman
- Wolfgang Steffen
- Ingo Schlupp
- Eleanor Robson
- Laurent Loinard
- Kathy Lu

=== October 2011 ===
- Jin Zhao
- Anna I. Krylov
- Yiguang Ju
- Georg Jander
- Carlos Eduardo Pereira (engineer)
- Jamie J. Kruzic
- Christian W. Bauer
- Kaustav Banerjee
- Penelope Evelyn Haxell

=== March 2012 ===
- Richard Kent Wolf
- Jonathan D. Bobaljik
- Jonas Tallberg
- Herman Steven Overkleeft
- Oliver Steinbock
- Gil Refael
- Boris Murmann
- Thomas W. Baumgarte
- Andrea Damascelli
- Steven Vanderputten
- Clifford Ando

=== October 2012 ===
- Olivier Remaud
- Ganpati Ramanath
- Hoang Nguyen The
- Michael H. Glickman
- Svetlana Krupko
- Martha W. Alibali
- Diego F. Torres
- Thomas Loerting
- Marc Legros
- Thomas Baumgartner

=== March 2013 ===
- Joseph A. Turner
- Hendrik Bluhm
- Dieter Fox
- Hans Förster
- Alejandro Fabian Schinder
- Emily Alexandra Holmes
- Zhiyuan Zhong
- Carol H. Shiue

=== October 2013 ===
- David Peter Dobson
- David Petrosyan
- Roman Vershynin
- Reem Sari
- Filip Lievens
- Stephan W. Haas
- Neil Brett Boister
- Eleni Anagnostopoulou
- Senjo Shimizu
- Thorsten W. Becker
- Martin Albrecht

=== March 2014 ===
- Steven D. Jacobsen
- Matthew Wing
- Marcus Weck
- Jakub Kloc-Konkolowicz
- Jyotsna Dutta Majumdar
- Christiane Wobus
- Jonathan Kimmelman
- Daniel A. McFarland
- Takahiro Sasamori

=== October 2014 ===
- Arturo Hernandez
- Emily S. Bernhardt
- Gianfranco Brunetti
- Ivan Smalyukh
- Tatyana Ivanovna Baturina
- Martin Reisslein
- Paula Diaconescu
- Jens Oliver Zinn
- Bertrand Rémy
- Ashraf Brik
- Juan Alvaro Echeverri
- Tehshik Peter Yoon
- Kerwyn Casey Huang

=== March 2015 ===
- Song-I Han
- Tuck-Po Lye
- Frank Griffel
- Beatrix Beisner
- Eugene R. Zubarev
- Shih-Yuan Liu
- Stefano Fabris
- Cas Mudde
- Vincenzo Grillo
- Samuel Grushevsky
- Pance Naumov

=== October 2015 ===
- Oleg Victor Prezhdo
- Paul J. Low
- Susanna Schellenberg
- Harald P. Pfeiffer
- Mikhail Belkin
- Mona Jarrahi
- Panayotis Kevrekidis
- Patrick L. Holland
- Ludovic van Waerbeke
- Ulrike M. Malmendier

=== March 2016 ===
- Gabriele Travaglini
- Bernd Stelzer
- Markus Kraft
- Joerg Widmer
- Roman Frigg
- Diego P. Vazquez
- Stefano Curtarolo
- João Marcos de Almeida

=== October 2016 ===
- Antonin Kucera
- Markus B. Raschke
- Fábio Armando Tal
- Tim M. P. Tait
- Jenny Reardon
- Annette Mairi Nelson Ferguson
- Javier Ballesteros Paredes
- Celine Peroux
- Wonpil Im
- Vlada Limic
- Emmanuel Lacote

=== March 2017 ===
- Paul Arne Ostvaer
- Omar Adel Saleh
- Vanesa Gottifredi
- Magali Isabelle Billen
- Franz M. Geiger
- Deji Akinwande
- Sebastian Kadener
- Satyam Suwas
- Dusan Stipanovic
- Yuri Y. Kovalev
- Martin Maier

=== October 2017 ===
- Paola Arlotta
- Oren Schuldiner
- Dimas G. de Oteyza
- Manuel Bibes
- Benjamin Isaac Rotenberg
- Uriah Kriegel
- Chris Lang
- Hui Deng
- Victor Chernozhukov
- Yannick Jerome Gwenael Dumeige
- Pedro Antonio Santoro Salomão
- Gabriella De Lucia
- Ilaria L. E. Ramelli
- Rodrigo Goncalves Pereira
- John Theodore Zilcosky
- Przemyslaw Marciniak
- David H. Gracias

=== March 2018 ===
- Saurabh Bagchi
- Mu-Hyun Baik
- Michael Spannowsky
- Piotr Faliszewski
- Laura Maria Herz
- Kazunori Sugiyasu
- Philip Stier
- Angelos Michaelides
- Dragos Gheorghe Calma

=== October 2018 ===
- Panayiota Poirazi
- Gurvan Michel
- Jens Biegert
- Dragan Huterer
- Jörg Rottler
- Trevor W. Hayton
- Derek A. Pratt
- Michael Benjamin Johnston
- Rodrigo Antonio Gutierrez
- Max Paul Friedman
- Catherine Lu

=== March 2019 ===
- Gianluca Panati
- Raymond A. Mar
- Maxim Berezovski
- Guosheng Liu
- Mihyun Kang
- Geza Toth
- Jure Zupan
- Patricia Wittkopp
- Lan Yang
- Xiaodong Chen
- Alexandru Babes

=== October 2019 ===
- Katja Loos
- Matevz Dular
- Denis Grebenkov
- Christopher Patrick Royall
- George Garinis
- Costica Bradatan
- Liv Hornekaer
- Su Lui
- Ronit Satchi-Fainaro
- Wei Biao Wu
- Stephen Liddle
- Jayant Sirohi

=== April 2020 ===
- Tobias Rees
- Carlos David Londoño Sulkin
- Filippo Fraternali
- Martin Sylvain Peter Lenz
- Kirill Dmitriev
- Gilad Perez
- Joshua Ruderman
- Gabor Hofer-Szabo
- Rainer M. Volkamer
- Bettina Bildhauer

=== October 2020 ===
- Yong Zhu
- Elin McCready
- Zachariah Weber
- Caroline Petit
- Diego Pol
- Julie Casteigt
- Verena Häussermann
- Swadhin Kumar Mandal
- Connie C. Lu
- Sonia Kefi
- Jose M. Goicoechea
- Salil Kanhere

=== March 2021 ===
- Hyo-In Koh
- Prineha Narang
- Nicola Lacetera
- Edwin P. Gerber
- William Chueh
- Christopher J. Hopwood
- Ludmilla Aristilde
- Amy Marshall-Colon
- Eileen Lueders
- Silvia De Rubeis
- Peter V. Dietsch
- Philip Walther

=== October 2021 ===
- Rob Ameloot
- Lynda C. Olman
- Marcus Matthias Opp
- Jennifer M. Schomaker
- Karabi Biswas
- Daniel Kuhn
- Kin Fai Mak
- Mahesh Kumar
- Brian F. Pfleger
- F. Sebastian Bergeret
- Raul Angulo
- Matthias Ihme
- Stephan Tillmann
- Gregory A. Fiete
- Richard Layfield
- Sergey Tikhonov

=== March 2022 ===
- Xu Deng
- Dominik Schleicher
- Abigail G. Doyle
- Tiago Pereira da Silva
- Joshua Goldberger
- Eva Miranda
- Darko Zibar
- Yam Siwakoti
- Theodor Agapie
- Tobias Grossmann
- Xiaoming Chen

=== October 2022 ===
- Jong Hyun Choi
- Lingling Huang
- Adam Jatowt
- Thomas Theis
- Jianping Fu
- Michail Stamatakis
- Sudha Arunachalam
- Domenico Agostini
- Hernan G. Garcia
- Nikita Basov
- Stephane Blondin
- Apala Majumdar
- Rubina Raja
- Harshan Kumarasingham
- C. Franklin Goldsmith
- Christian Vassallo

=== March 2023 ===
- Stefano Palminteri
- Vincent Pouliot
- Tiffany A. Shaw
- Lucian N. Leustean
- Colin Reid
- Xiao-Ming Liu
- Rachel Ward
- Abhay Sagade
- Marianne Lemoine-Goumard

=== October 2023 ===
- Chris Brown (educator)
- Konrad Menzel
- Adam Millard-Ball
- Alyssa Ney
- Ivo Rolf Seitenzahl
- Sergey Tsygankov
- Eva Hevia
- Natalia B. Shustova
- Michael Moehler
- Claire Spottiswoode
- Haibo Ma
- Haimanti Biswas

=== March 2024 ===
- Ofer Firstenberg
- Randy Stockbridge
- Romain Jolivet
- Adam M. Kaufman
- Wei Hu
- Mohamed Ali Belabbas
- Chong Han
- Daniel Siemens
- Charles W. Machan
- Roel P. A. Dullens
- Jeroen Schillewaert
- Bin Wang

=== October 2024 ===
- Selvan Demir
- David Shih
- Francesco Tornabene
- Bilal Orfali
- Tanja Cuk
- Guangbin Dong
- Todd K. Hyster
- Benjamin Schoefer
- Rajesh Kumar
- Szabolcs Csonka

=== March 2025 ===
- Michael Werner Zürch
- Mohammad Javed Ali
- Sujit Kumar Ghosh
- Torsten Bringmann
- Roni Katzir
- Hadas Okon-Singer
- Giorgio Di Gessa
- Alexis Rouillard
- Riccardo Comin
- Marina Franco
- Sedat Gümüs
- Shaibal Mukherjee
- Liangzhi Kou
- Christopher Metcalf
