= Harald Pfeiffer =

German theoretical physicist (born 1974)

Harald Pfeiffer (born 1974) is a German astrophysicist at the University of Potsdam.

== Education and career ==
Pfeiffer attended the Steigerwald-Landschulheim-Weisentheid, graduating in 1993. In 1993, he participated in the International Physics Olympiad, winning a gold medal. He studied physics at the University of Bayreuth from 1994 to 1997, before continuing to the University of Cambridge from 1997 to 1998. Following this, he attended Cornell University, completing his PhD in 2003. Between 2003 and 2009, he was employed at California Institute of Technology, first as a Sherman Fairchild Postdoctoral Scholar, and then as a Senior Postdoctoral Scholar. He then took up a position as associate, and then assistant, professor at the Canadian Institute for Theoretical Astrophysics, University of Toronto.

Since 2017, Pfeiffer has been a group leader in the Astrophysical and Cosmological Relativity department at the Max Planck Institute for Gravitational Physics in Potsdam, and a professor at the university of Potsdam.

== Research interests ==
Pfeiffer's work focuses on the applications of numerical relativity to gravitational wave astronomy. He develops methods to solve problems from gravitational physics using supercomputers. In particular, he uses simulations to answer questions about the emission of gravitational radiation from binary systems of black holes or neutron stars. He is involved in the analysis of detector data from LIGO, Virgo, and KAGRA, and also works on the development of new experiments such as LISA.

Together with Lawrence Kidder and Mark School, he is a lead developer of the Spectral Einstein Code (SpEC), which solves numerically the partial differential equations describing compact binary coalescences. Using this code, they are able to predict the gravitational waveforms produced by such systems, which can then be searched for in detector data.

Pfeiffer is also interested in improving the theoretical understanding of the properties of the Einstein Field Equations, and exploring possible alternative theories of gravity.

== Awards ==
- 2015: Friedrich Wilhelm Bessel Research Award
- 2016: Special Breakthrough Prize in Fundamental Physics
- 2016: Gruber Cosmology Prize
- 2023: Fellow of the American Physical Society, for his leadership and numerous high-impact research contributions to the field of numerical relativity, which have greatly helped to interpret gravitational-wave observations of binary black holes.
