= Alibali =

Alibali is a surname. Notable people with the surname include:

- Ferial Alibali (1933–2011), Albanian actress
- Martha W. Alibali, American psychologist
