= Tayyaba Zafar =

Astronomer and science communicator

- Born: 29 May 1983 (age 43); Lahore, Pakistan
- Citizenship: Pakistani; Australian
- Education: University of the Punjab (MSc 2005); University of Copenhagen (PhD 2011)
- Known for: First Pakistani woman in Antarctica.
- Awards: 2020 NSW Tall Poppy
- Scientific career
- Fields: Astronomy
- Workplaces: University of Copenhagen; European Southern Observatory; Australian Astronomical Observatory; Macquarie University

Tayyaba Zafar (born 29 May 1983) is a Pakistani-born astronomer and science communicator. She is widely known to the public as the first woman from Pakistan who visited Antarctica under the Homeward Bound Program. She completed her PhD in astronomy from the University of Copenhagen, Denmark in 2011 and worked at the European Southern Observatory and Australian Astronomical Observatory. She researches how metals and dust form in distant galaxies and their effects are on star formation and other galaxy properties.

== Early life and education ==
Zafar was born and grew up in Lahore, Pakistan. She completed her PhD in 2011, at the Dark Cosmology Center, University of Copenhagen with a thesis entitled Spectroscopy of high redshift sightlines. This started her astrophysics career working on interstellar medium studies.

== Research career ==
After completing her PhD, Zafar accepted a postdoctoral position at the Laboratorie d’Astrophysique de Marseille, France. In 2013, she moved to Germany to take up a fellowship at the European Southern Observatory (ESO). She later accepted a Research Astronomer role at the Australian Astronomical Observatory. She moved to Australia in November 2015, and supported the Anglo Australian Telescope at the Siding Spring Observatory. In mid-2018, she was hired by Macquarie University where she is currently serving as a Senior-Lecturer.

Her research focuses on the obscured universe and its connection with properties of galaxies. As of June 2021, SAO/NASA Astrophysics Data System lists her 59 refereed publications.

== Science communication ==
Zafar became recognised as a public figure when she visited Antarctica in 2018 under the Homeward Bound project, a personal and professional development program to empower STEMM women leaders. She has given public talks such as for Sydney Science Festival, talks to amateur astronomical societies, schools, and universities and written scientific online articles. She is a member of the 2021 CSIRO STEM Professionals in Schools, Australia program to team up with teachers to educate and inspire students. She has given multi-lingual TV interviews, including a one-to-one interview for Such TV and breakfast show with Lahore News TV. She has radio and print interviews including interviews for BBC World, ABC News, SBS, and EFE Verde. She has online articles on astronomy, instrumentation, and women in STEM issues. She has been invited as a panelist for women in STEM discussion panels e.g., Sydney Science Trail in 2020.

== Awards ==
- 2020 NSW Young Tall Poppy Science Award for scientific contributions and communications in Australia.

== Selected publications ==
- Zafar, T., D. Watson, J. P. U. Fynbo, D. Malesani, P. Jakobsson, and A. de Ugarte Postigo 2011. The extinction curves of star-forming regions from z = 0.1 to 6.7 using GRB afterglow spectroscopy. Astronomy and Astrophysics 532, A143. 2011A&A...532A.143Z
- Zafar, T., C. Péroux, A. Popping, B. Milliard, J.-M. Deharveng, and S. Frank 2013. The ESO UVES advanced data products quasar sample. II. Cosmological evolution of the neutral gas mass density. Astronomy and Astrophysics 556, A141. 2013A&A...556A.141Z
- Zafar, T. and D. Watson 2013. The metals-to-dust ratio to very low metallicities using GRB and QSO absorbers; extremely rapid dust formation. Astronomy and Astrophysics 560, A26. 2013A&A...560A..26Z
