= Eugenii Shustin =

Mathematician

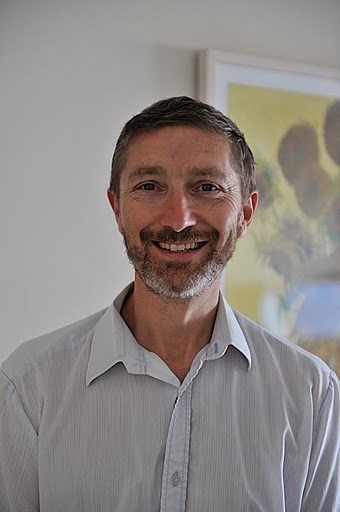
- Shustin in 2010
- Born: August 15, 1957 (age 68); Kaliningrad, USSR (now Russia))
- Scientific career
- Fields: Mathematics
- Institutions: Tel Aviv University

Eugenii Isaacovich Shustin (Russian: Евгéний Исаáкович Шýстин, Hebrew: יבגני שוסטין), is a Soviet and Israeli mathematician, who works on real algebraic geometry, singularity theory, tropical geometry, and enumerative geometry.

== Education and career ==
Eugenii Shustin obtained his diploma (M.Sc.) in Mathematics in 1979 at Gorky State University (now N.I. Lobachevsky State University of Nizhny Novgorod) and his Ph.D. degree in 1984 at Leningrad State University (now Saint Petersburg State University) under the guidance of D.A. Gudkov.

Till 1987 he worked at the Department of Higher Mathematics of the Gorky Civil Engineering Institute, then moved to the Department of Algebra and Geometry of the Kuibyshev State University (now Samara State University), where he held positions of Assistant Professor and Senior Lecturer. In 1992 Shustin emigrated to Israel and joined the School of Mathematical Sciences at Tel Aviv University, where he held positions of Associate Professor, from 1997 - Full Professor, and from 2025 he is Professor Emeritus.

== Research ==
Shustin works on the geometry of equisingular families of curves on algebraic surfaces, on tropical geometry, and on real enumerative geometry. The asymptotically optimal numerical sufficient conditions for the non-emptiness, smoothness, and irreducibility of equisingular families of curves on algebraic surfaces (in part obtained jointly with Gert-Martin Greuel and Christoph Lossen) were the subject of his invited talk at the International Congress of Mathematicians 1990 in Kyoto, gained for him Friedrich Wilhelm Bessel Research Award in 2001, and were summarized in the monograph [GLS2]. Other results (mainly joint works with Ilia Itenberg and Viatcheslav Kharlamov) concern properties of Welschinger invariants: tropical formulas, positivity and asymptotic equivalence to Gromov-Witten invariants.

== Personal life ==
In 1987, Shustin married Emilia Fridman.

== Selected publications ==
- [ICM] E. Shustin. Geometry of discriminant and topology of algebraic curves. Proceedings of the International Congress of Mathematicians, Vol. I, II (Kyoto, 1990), 559–567. Mathematical Society of Japan, Tokyo, 1991
- [TW] E. Shustin. A tropical calculation of the Welschinger invariants of real toric del Pezzo surfaces. J. Alg. Geom. 15 (2006), no. 2, 285-322.
- [IMS] I. Itenberg, G. Mikhalkin, and E. Shustin. Tropical Algbraic Geometry. Oberwolfach Semin., 35. Birkhäuser-Verlag, Basel, 2007, viii+103 pp.
- [IKS] I. Itenberg, V. Kharlamov, and E. Shustin. Welschinger invariants of real del Pezzo surfaces of degree ≥2. International J. Math. 26 (2015), DOI: 10.1142/S0129167X15500603.
- [GLS1] G.-M. Greuel, C. Lossen, and E. Shustin. Introduction to Singularities and Deformations. 2nd ed. Springer Monogr. Math. Springer, Cham, 2025, xvii+717 pp.
- [GLS2] G.-M. Greuel, C. Lossen, and E. Shustin. Singular Algebraic Curves. Springer Monogr. Math. Springer, Cham, 2018, xx+553 pp.
