= Hilal Lashuel =

American-Yemeni neuroscientist

Professor Hilal Lashuel
- Born: January 15, 1973 (age 53); Taiz, Yemen
- Citizenship: Yemeni; American
- Occupations: Associate professor, entrepreneur

Academic background
- Education: Chemistry
- Alma mater: City University of New York; Texas A&M University
- Doctoral advisor: Jeffery W. Kelly

Academic work
- Discipline: Neuroscience
- Sub-discipline: Neurodegenerative disorders
- Institutions: EPFL (École Polytechnique Fédérale de Lausanne)
- Main interests: Alzheimer's disease Parkinson's disease
- Website: https://www.epfl.ch/labs/lashuel-lab/

Hilal Lashuel (born January 15, 1973 in Taiz, Yemen) is an American-Yemeni neuroscientist and chemist, currently an associate professor at the EPFL (École Polytechnique Fédérale de Lausanne). His research focuses on protein misfolding and aggregation in the pathogenesis of Alzheimer's and Parkinson's diseases.

== Education and career ==
Hilal Lashuel graduated with a degree in chemistry from the City University of New York in 1994. He then obtained a PhD jointly from the Texas A&M University and the Scripps Research Institute in 2000, working on protein misfolding and aggregation under the supervision of Jeffery W. Kelly. He pursued postdoctoral work at the Harvard Medical School and the Brigham and Women's Hospital in the laboratories of Peter T. Lansbury and David Callaway from 2001 to 2004. In 2005, he created his own research group at the EPFL as a tenure-track assistant professor, and was promoted to associate professor in 2011.

Besides his current position at EPFL, Hilal Lashuel was also a visiting associate professor at the Department of Neurology and Neurological Sciences at Stanford University from 2012 to 2013, and served as the executive director of the Qatar Biomedical Research Institute and as a professor at the Hamad Bin Khalifa University from 2014 to 2016.

== Research ==
Hilal Lashuel heads the Laboratory of Molecular Neurobiology and Neuroproteomics (LMNN) at the Brain Mind Institute within the School of Life Sciences at the EPFL (École Polytechnique Fédérale de Lausanne). Research in Lashuel's laboratory employs synthetic chemistry, biochemistry, and in vivo approaches to study the role of protein misfolding and aggregation in the pathogenesis of neurodegenerative disorders such as Alzheimer's (AD) and Parkinson's (PD) diseases. Several research axes are investigated by researchers at the LMNN:

- Chemical Biology: The Lashuel group has developed synthetic and semi-synthetic strategies that enable site-specific modification at single or multiple sites of several proteins linked to neurodegenerative diseases, including alpha-synuclein, Tau and several N-terminal fragments of the Huntingtin protein. In addition, in collaboration with Ashraf Brik, the Lashuel group has developed methods that allow site-specific nitration and has contributed to the development of methods for site-specific poly-ubiquitination of proteins. Together, these advances have opened up possibilities for the systematic and comprehensive investigation of the role of post-translational modifications in regulating the structure, function, aggregation and toxicity of several proteins that play central roles in the pathogenesis of neurodegenerative diseases. In addition, the synthetic tools and capabilities developed in the Lashuel lab provide opportunities to investigate the cross-talk between different modifications, paving the way for deciphering the post-translational modification code of these proteins in health and disease.
- The role of post-translational modifications in the pathogenesis of neurodegenerative diseases: Research in the Lashuel group has led to the discovery of novel kinases that regulate alpha-synuclein and Huntingtin phosphorylation, aggregation, clearance and toxicity, providing novel therapeutic targets for the treatment of both Parkinson's disease and Huntington's disease.
- Novel Model of Parkinson's disease: The Lashuel lab has developed novel neuronal disease model that enable recapitulating the key hallmarks of Parkinson's disease (PD) in the human brain, including the development of Lewy body (LB) pathologies and neurodegeneration. These efforts have led to the development of neuronal models that reproduce the different stages of Lewy body formation, from seeding to fibrillization to the formation of LB-like inclusions at the molecular, biochemical, proteomic, transcriptomic, and structural levels. These models are being used to investigate the molecular mechanisms underpinning these processes, to elucidate their role in alpha-synuclein-induced toxicity and potential contributions to the pathogenesis of Parkison's Disease, and to screen for therapeutic agents for the treatment of Parkinson's disease based on modulating the different stages of LB formation and toxic pathways associated with each stage. These advances have led to the identification of small molecule drug for the treatment of Parkinson's disease.
- From Mechanisms to Therapeutic Strategies: The Lashuel lab demonstrated that fibril growth and seeding capacity are key determinants of amyloid-beta- and alpha-synuclein-mediated toxicity and showed that inhibiting fibril growth and seeding capacity using small molecules represents a viable and effective strategy for protecting against neurodegeneration and disease progression in animal and neuronal models of Alzheimer's and Parkinson's disease. Furthermore, this work showed that photomodulation protects against neuronal loss in a genetic model of Parkinson's disease. Follow up studies in the laboratory aims to elucidate the mechanisms underlying the beneficial effects of photomodulation and to develop devices to test its efficacy in the clinical setting. More recently, Lashuel and colleagues showed the process of Lewy body formation and maturation, rather than simply α-syn fibril formation, is a major contributor to alpha-synunclein-induced toxicity and neurodegeneration in Parkinson's disease and synucleinopathies.
- Biomarkers identification and validation: The Lashuel group is a member of several international consortia which aim to develop novel therapies for the treatment of neurodegenerative diseases and to identify biomarkers for improving diagnosis, monitoring disease progression and establishing target engagement in clinical trials.

== Entrepreneurship ==
Hilal Lashuel is the founder of ND BioSciences, a biotechnology startup created in 2019 with the aim to develop and provide technologies and services to accelerate the development of early diagnostics and therapies for neurodegenerative diseases. ND BioSciences has developed technologies that enable to reproduce, at both the biochemical and structural levels, the proteoforms and pathological species found in the brain and biological fluids of patients with neurodegenerative diseases.

In 2019, ND biosciences received the Michael J. Fox Foundation for Parkinson's Research (MJFF) grant for its Protein Science and Discovery program.

== Recognition ==
Hilal Lashuel is the recipient of several international research prizes and distinctions:

- 2019: Takreem Foundation Award for Scientific and Technological Achievements
- 2018: Kuwait Prize in Fundamental Sciences
- 2012: Named a Young Global Leader by the World Economic Forum
- 2009: European Research Council Starting Grant
- 2009: Human Frontiers Science Program Young Investigator Grant
