= Zerilli =

Zerilli is a surname. Notable people with the surname include:

- Anna Zerilli, American college football player
- Anthony Joseph Zerilli (1927–2015), Italian-American mobster
- Joseph Zerilli (1897–1977), Italian-American mobster

== See also ==
- Perilli
