= Martin Albrecht =

Martin Albrecht may refer to:

- Martin Albrecht (businessman), Australian businessman
- Martin Albrecht (chemist) (born 1971), Swiss chemist
- Martin Albrecht (musician), German musician; former member of Mystic Prophecy
