= Vlada Limic =

Croatian-French mathematician

Vlada Limic is a mathematician specializing in probability theory, the theory of random graphs, and coalescent theory. Educated in Croatia and the US, she has worked in the US, Canada, and France, where she is a director of research for the French National Centre for Scientific Research (CNRS), affiliated with the University of Strasbourg.

== Education and career ==
Limic studied mathematics at the University of Zagreb in Croatia, graduating in 1994. She continued her studies at the University of California, Berkeley, where she completed her doctorate in 1998. Her dissertation, Properties of the Multiplicative Coalescent, was supervised by David Aldous.

After postdoctoral research at the University of California, San Diego and Cornell University in the US, she moved to Canada in 2002 to become an assistant professor at the University of British Columbia. In 2006 she moved again, to France, where she became a researcher for the CNRS, affiliated with the University of Provence. In 2012 she became a director of research for the CNRS and in 2017 she became affiliated with the University of Strasbourg.

Limic was the editor for the IMS Bulletin, a former publication of the Institute of Mathematical Statistics, from 2017 to 2019. With Greg Lawler, she is a coauthor of the book Random Walk: A Modern Introduction (2010).

== Recognition ==
Limic was a 2016 recipient of the Friedrich Wilhelm Bessel Research Award of the Alexander von Humboldt Foundation. She was a 2022 Medallion Lecturer of the Institute of Mathematical Statistics.
