= Jyotsna Dutta Majumdar =

Indian materials scientist and metallurgist

Jyotsna Dutta Majumdar (born 1969) is an Indian materials scientist and metallurgist whose research focuses on the use of lasers to process the surfaces of materials. She is a professor of metallurgical and materials engineering at IIT Kharagpur.

== Education and career ==
Dutta Majumdar received a bachelor's degree in metallurgy in 1990 from the University of Calcutta. She continued her studies at IIT Kharagpur, receiving a master's degree in metallurgical engineering in 1991 and completing a Ph.D. there in 1999. In 2000, she received a second doctorate (Dr.-Ing.) from the Clausthal University of Technology in Germany.

After briefly working as a lecturer at the Bengal Engineering College, Howrah she returned to IIT Kharagpur as an assistant professor in 2000. She was promoted to associate professor in 2007 and full professor in 2011. She was named as an Institute Chair Professor in 2022.

== Recognition ==
In 2000 the Indian Institute of Metals named Dutta Majumdar as Young Metallurgist of the Year; they named her as Metallurgist of the Year in 2012. She was a 2003 recipient of the Young Engineer Award of the Indian National Academy of Engineering. The Materials Research Society of India gave her their 2013 MRSI Medal.

Dutta Majumdar was a 2014 recipient of the Friedrich Wilhelm Bessel Research Award of the Alexander von Humboldt Foundation. She is a 2022 Fellow of the Indian National Science Academy, a 2024 Fellow of the National Academy of Sciences, India, and a 2025 Fellow of the Royal Society of Chemistry.
