= Admela Jukan =

Electrical engineer

Admela Jukan is an electrical engineer whose research topics include optical networking and cloud computing and, separately, animal–computer interaction. She was educated in Croatia, Italy, and Austria, and has worked in Austria, the US, Canada, and Germany, where she is Chair for Communication Networks in the Department of Electrical & Computer Engineering and Physics at the Technical University of Braunschweig.

== Education and career ==
Jukan has an engineering degree from the Faculty of Electrical Engineering and Computing, University of Zagreb in Croatia. After earning a master's degree in information technology from the Polytechnic University of Milan in Italy, she went to TU Wien in Austria for doctoral study in electrical and computer engineering.

She continued at TU Wien as an assistant professor and university lecturer. She became a research assistant professor at Georgia Tech in the US, a program director for the US National Science Foundation from 2002 to 2004, and then an associate professor at the Institut national de la recherche scientifique in Canada, before moving to her present position at TU Braunschweig.

She is co-editor-in-chief, with Martin Reisslein, of the journal Optical Switching and Networking. With Ilyena Hirskyj-Douglas, she runs the Animals In Computing website and blog.

== Recognition ==
Jukan won the 2018 service award of the IEEE Optical Networking Technical Committee, "for outstanding service to the optical network community". She was elected as an IEEE Fellow in 2022, "for contributions to optical communications and networking".
