= Patricia Wittkopp =

American evolutionary biologist

- Occupation: Evolutionary biologist
- Awards: Guggenheim Fellowship (2019); Fellow of the American Association for the Advancement of Science (2021)

Academic background
- Education: University of Michigan; University of Wisconsin–Madison
- Thesis: Development and evolution of pigmentation in the genus drosophila (2002)
- Doctoral advisor: Sean B. Carroll

Academic work
- Discipline: Evolutionary biology
- Sub-discipline: Population genetics (BS); evolutionary developmental biology (PhD)
- Institutions: University of Michigan

Patricia J. Wittkopp (née Polacyzk) is an American evolutionary biologist. A 2019 Guggenheim Fellow and 2021 Fellow of the American Association for the Advancement of Science, she is currently the Deborah E. Goldberg Distinguished University Professor at the University of Michigan.

== Biography ==
Wittkopp obtained a BS in chemistry and a BS in cellular and molecular biology (with highest honors) from the University of Michigan in 1997, as well as a PhD in genetics from the University of Wisconsin–Madison. Her doctoral dissertation Development and evolution of pigmentation in the genus drosophila was supervised by Sean B. Carroll. After working as a Damon Runyon Cancer Research Foundation postdoctoral fellow at Cornell University since 2002, Wittkopp returned to UMich in September 2005 as a faculty member.

Originally an assistant professor at UMich, Wittkopp was promoted to associate professor in 2011 and full professor in 2015. In July 2020, she became chair of UMich's Department of Ecology and Evolutionary Biology. In July 2023, she became the UMich College of Literature, Science, and the Arts' (LSA) new associate dean of natural sciences. In September 2025, she became UMich LSA's first associate dean for research.

As an academic, Wittkopp researches population genetics and evolutionary developmental biology. Her lab at UMich is centered on the genetics behind phenotypic evolution. She teaches genetics and evolutionary biology at UMich.

At UMich, she was awarded a 2016 Arthur F. Thurnau Professorship and a 2017 Sally L. Allen Collegiate Professorship. In 2019, she was awarded a Guggenheim Fellowship in Biology, as well as a Friedrich Wilhelm Bessel Research Award to work at the European Molecular Biology Laboratory under the sponsorship of Eileen Furlong. In 2021, she was appointed Fellow of the American Association for the Advancement of Science in the Section on Biological Sciences.
