= Marianne Lemoine-Goumard =

French astrophysicist

Marianne Lemoine-Goumard is a French astrophysicist whose research investigates the origins of cosmic rays, and has used the interactions of cosmic rays with cosmic dust clouds to detect the outflows of cosmic rays from dust-shrouded star clusters such as Westerlund 1. She is a director of research for the French National Centre for Scientific Research (CNRS), affiliated with the Laboratoire de Physique des 2 Infinis de Bordeaux (LP2i Bordeaux) in Gradignan.

== Education and career ==
After a master's degree at the École Centrale Paris, Lemoine-Goumard defended her Ph.D. in 2006 at the École polytechnique, under the direction of Bernard Degrange, based on observations using the High Energy Stereoscopic System in Namibia.

She began working as a researcher for the CNRS in Gradignan in 2006, working there with the Fermi Gamma-ray Space Telescope project. She was promoted to director of research in 2020. Beyond observations with Fermi, she is involved in the development of future observatories: the Southern Wide-field Gamma-ray Observatory in Chile, and the Cherenkov Telescope Array Observatory in the Canary Islands and Chile.

== Recognition ==
Lemoine-Goumard was a 2023 recipient of the Friedrich Wilhelm Bessel Research Award of the Alexander von Humboldt Foundation, and a 2026 recipient of the CNRS Silver Medal.
