= Perilli =

Perilli is an Italian surname. Notable people with the surname include:

- Alessandra Perilli (born 1988), Sammarinese sport shooter
- Alessio Perilli (1983–2004), Italian motorcycle racer
- Arianna Perilli (born 1978), Sammarinese sport shooter
- Frank Ray Perilli (1925–2018), American screenwriter, playwright and actor
- Ivo Perilli (1902–1994), Italian screenwriter
- Lorenzo Perilli, Italian classicist and academic
- Simone Perilli (born 1995), Italian footballer
