= Kathy Lu =

Chinese-American materials scientist

Peizhen Kathy Lu is a Chinese and American materials scientist whose research focuses on polymer-based ceramics and composite materials for extreme environments. She is a professor and Engineering Leadership Endowed Scholar at the University of Alabama at Birmingham, and the inaugural chair of its Department of Mechanical and Materials Engineering.

She was president of Sigma Xi for the 2024–2026 term.

== Education and career ==
Lu received a 1990 bachelor's degree in ceramics from Tianjin University, and a master's degree in 1993. After working as an assistant professor of materials science and engineering at Beihang University from 1993 to 1996, she continued her studies in materials science and engineering at the Ohio State University. She received a second master's degree there in 1999 and completed her Ph.D. in 2000.

She became a postdoctoral research as director of materials processing in the Center for Innovative Sintered Products at Pennsylvania State University, and then worked in industry for three years at the Eveready Battery Company. She returned to academia as an assistant professor of materials science and engineering at Virginia Tech in 2004. There, she was promoted to associate professor in 2010 and full professor in 2015, with visiting positions in Europe in 2012 and 2021 as a Humboldt Fellow and Fulbright Scholar, respectively.

When the University of Alabama at Birmingham formed its Department of Mechanical and Materials Engineering in 2023, from the merger of its previous Department of Mechanical Engineering and Department of Materials Science and Engineering, the university brought Lu in as the inaugural chair of the new department, after a national search.

== Recognition ==
The American Ceramic Society gave Lu the 2008 Karl Schwartzwalder-Professional Achievement in Ceramic Engineering Award. She is a 2011 recipient of the Friedrich Wilhelm Bessel Research Award of the Alexander von Humboldt Foundation.

She was elected as a Fellow of the American Ceramic Society in 2017, and a Fellow of The Minerals, Metals & Materials Society in 2022 "for seminal contributions to the fundamental and applied research of materials science and engineering, especially regarding materials synthesis, processing, and performance in demanding environments".
