= Zuzanna S. Siwy =

Polish–American chemist

Zuzanna Stefania Siwy
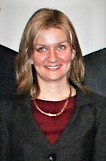
- Siwy in 2010
- Born: 1972 (age 53–54); Poland
- Education: Silesian University of Technology
- Scientific career
- Workplaces: University of Florida; University of California, Irvine

Zuzanna Stefania Siwy (born 1972) is a Polish–American chemist at the University of California, Irvine. Her research considers synthetic nanopores and their application in ionic devices. She is a Fellow of the American Physical Society, American Association for the Advancement of Science and Foundation for Polish Science.

== Early life and education ==
Siwy is from Poland. She studied chemistry at the Silesian University of Technology in Poland. She graduated with a master's degree in polymer technology in 1995, before completing a doctorate in chemical sciences in 1997. Siwy was a postdoctoral scholar at the University of Florida.

== Research and career ==
Siwy joined the faculty at the University of California, Irvine in 2005. In 2012 she was made Professor of Chemical Physics. She studies synthetic nanopores, which she looks to use as templates for biomimetic channels as well as ionic diodes and transistors.

== Awards and honours ==
- 2000 Elected Fellow of the Foundation for Polish Science
- 2001 Elected Fellow of the Alexander von Humboldt Foundation
- 2007 Alfred P. Sloan Foundation Fellow
- 2008 National Science Foundation CAREER Award
- 2009 Friedrich Wilhelm Bessel Research Award
- 2009 Presidential Early Career Award for Scientists and Engineers
- 2012 University of California, Irvine Distinguished Mid-Career Faculty Award for Research
- 2013 Elected Fellow of the American Physical Society
- 2019 Elected Fellow of the American Association for the Advancement of Science

== Selected publications ==
- Howorka, Stefan; Siwy, Zuzanna (2009-07-21). "Nanopore analytics: sensing of single molecules". Chemical Society Reviews. 38 (8): 2360–2384. doi:10.1039/B813796J. ISSN 1460-4744. PMID 19623355.
- Siwy, Z. S. (2006). "Ion-Current Rectification in Nanopores and Nanotubes with Broken Symmetry". Advanced Functional Materials. 16 (6): 735–746. doi:10.1002/adfm.200500471. ISSN 1616-3028. S2CID 97360252.
- Siwy, Z.; Fuliński, A. (2002-10-18). "Fabrication of a Synthetic Nanopore Ion Pump". Physical Review Letters. 89 (19) 198103. Bibcode:2002PhRvL..89s8103S. doi:10.1103/PhysRevLett.89.198103. PMID 12443155.
