= Ivan Smalyukh =

Physicist

Ivan I Smalyukh
- Born: July 7, 1972 (age 54); Lviv, Ukraine
- Education: Lviv Polytechnic National University (B.S.,M.S. 1995); Kent State University (Ph.D., 2003)
- Known for: Hopfions; Heliknotons; Toron; Topological colloids Topological soliton Transparent aerogels Monoclinic and Orthorhombic Liquid crystals Möbiuson; Biaxial ferromagnetic liquid crystal colloids Knotted chiral meta matter paradigm
- Awards: PECASE Award (White House); ILCS Mid Career Award; ACS Langmuir Lectureship; Bessel Research Award; APS GSoft Career Award (2016); G.W. Gray Medal; Kavli Frontiers Fellow; IOP Publishing Paper Award; IAS Distinguished Scholar, Tel Aviv Univ., Israel; IAS Distinguished Fellowship, Univ. Birmingham; Visiting Fellowship, Newton Inst., Cambridge, UK; CNRS Chair and Paris Sciences Chair, Paris, France; NASA iTech Award; NSF & DOE Career Awards; Glenn H. Brown ILCS Dissertation Prize; UNESCO “Bio-image” travel Fellowship; ILCS Multi-media award 2001 David B. Smith Fellowship (Kent State University) 1998 Intl. Science Foundation (G. Soros) Award
- Scientific career
- Fields: Condensed Matter Physics
- Workplaces: University of Colorado Boulder; WPI-SKCM2
- Website: https://www.colorado.edu/soft-matter-physics/

Ivan I. Smalyukh is a physicist working in the fields of soft condensed matter physics, especially in the domain of liquid crystals, topology, chirality and metamaterials. He is a professor in the Department of Physics at the University of Colorado at Boulder and the founding director of the International Institute for Sustainability with Knotted Chiral Meta Matter with headquarters at Hiroshima University, recently directing CU-Boulder branch of the institute. He is the Chief Editor of a Nature-family NPJ Soft Matter journal. Smalyukh was awarded the Presidential Early Career Award for Scientists and Engineers, among many other awards. He and his research group hold the Guinness record for achieving the highest visible-range optical transparency in a material.

== Research ==
Smalyukh's scientific interests span various aspects of soft condensed matter and optical physics. This includes the study of laser trapping and imaging techniques, molecular and colloidal self-assembly, and the fundamental properties of materials such as liquid crystals, polymers, and nano-structured substances. Among many of Smalyukh's research interests is the energy efficiency of windows and building envelopes overall. Additionally, the photonic and electro-optic applications of these materials are his group's research interests.

As something that he is widely known for, Smalyukh has studied vortex knots and solitons and knots in liquid crystals, contributing to new methods to form microscopic knots in physical fields.

Smalyukh used cellulose nanofibres to develop a transparent and highly thermally insulating aerogel. This work was published in Nature Energy due to the material's potential to enhance the heat lost through windows.

== Biography ==
Smalyukh began his academic journey at Lviv Polytechnic National University in Ukraine, where he completed his Bachelor's and Master of Science degrees in 1994 and 1995, respectively. Furthering his education, he obtained his PhD in Chemical Physics from Kent State University in 2003.

Following his PhD, Smalyukh held postdoctoral positions at the University of Illinois at Urbana-Champaign and the Liquid Crystal Institute and AlphaMicron Inc. Between 2004 and 2006, he also worked as a Visiting Scientist at the Institute for Lasers, Photonics, & Biophotonics at SUNY at Buffalo.

In 2007, Smalyukh joined the Department of Physics and Liquid Crystal Materials Research Center at the University of Colorado Boulder, as a Tenure Track Assistant Professor. By 2014, he was an Associate Professor with tenure in the same department. In 2017, he became a tenured full Professor in the Department of Physics. Additionally, Smalyukh holds a courtesy appointment in the Department of Electrical, Computer, and Energy Engineering at the University of Colorado at Boulder. He is also a founding fellow of Renewable Sustainable Energy Institute (a joint institute of CU-Boulder and NREL) and Materials Science Engineering Program. He directs the Soft Matter Physics Research Group at CU-Boulder. He was the Founding Director of the International Institute for Sustainability with Knotted Chiral Meta Matter (SKCM2), hosted by Hiroshima University in Japan and is currently directing a Satellite odyssey SKCM2 at University of Colorado.

Throughout his career, Smalyukh has received many awards, including the Early Career Award for Soft Matter Research of the American Physical Society in 2016, Langmuir Lectureship Award of the American Chemical Society in 2021, and the ICMS Distinguished Scholar award from the Institute for Complex Molecular Systems at Eindhoven University of Technology in The Netherlands in 2022. He also received awards like the Bessel and Glenn Brown Awards, NASA iTech award and Mid-Career Award of International Liquid Crystal Society and the PECASE Award from the Office of Science and Technology of the White House.

Smalyukh has also been actively involved in the scientific community. He has organized and participated in conferences and workshops, such as the 2019 Gordon Research Conference on Liquid Crystals at the University of New England and the Kickoff Symposium on Knotted Chiral Meta Matter in Hiroshima, Japan, in 2023. He has published over 250 peer-refereed articles, including many in Nature and Science. He has also been a member of editorial boards for several international journals. He is an elected fellow of several international societies, including American Association for Advancement of Science, AAAS, American Physical Society (APS), Optica, and SPIE.
