= Cary Forest =

Professor of physics

Cary B. Forest is professor of physics at the University of Wisconsin–Madison. His research relates to experimental plasma physics on the border between nuclear fusion research and laboratory plasma astrophysics. He is a fellow of the American Physical Society.

His APS fellowship citation in 2008 read that it was awarded "for broad and fundamental advances in plasma physics, from electromagnetic wave propagation and transport processes in fusion plasmas to dynamo effects underlying geomagnetic and astrophysical magnetic field generation".
