= Martin Reisslein =

American electronics engineer

Martin Reisslein is an engineer from Arizona State University in Tempe. He was named a Fellow of the Institute of Electrical and Electronics Engineers (IEEE) in 2014 for his contributions to the design and performance evaluation of metropolitan networks and multimedia networking mechanisms. He holds B.S. (1994) from Darmstadt University of Applied Sciences and an M.S. (1996) and Ph.D. (1998) from the University of Pennsylvania.

Reisslein is co-editor-in-chief, with Admela Jukan, of the journal Optical Switching and Networking.
