= Costica Bradatan =

Romanian-born American philosopher

- Born: 1971 (age 54–55)

Philosophical work
- Era: Contemporary philosophy
- Region: Western philosophy
- School: Continental philosophy
- Institutions: Texas Tech University
- Website: http://www.webpages.ttu.edu/cbradata/

Costică Brădățan (born 1971) is a Romanian-born American philosopher.

He is Paul Whitfield Horn Distinguished Professor of Humanities in the Honors College at Texas Tech University and an Honorary Research Professor of Philosophy at University of Queensland. He has also held faculty appointments at Cornell University, Notre Dame University, and University of Wisconsin-Madison, as well as at various universities and research institutes in Europe, Asia, and Latin America. In 2024 he was awarded the PROSE Award in Philosophy for his book In Praise of Failure. Four Lessons in Humility (Harvard University Press, 2023). For the Italian edition of the same book, he received Il Premio di Saggistica “Città delle Rose.” In 2016 Brădăţan received the "Public Scholar Award" from the National Endowment for the Humanities. He was also awarded the Friedrich Wilhelm Bessel-Forschungspreis by the Humboldt Foundation, as well as two Fulbright U.S. Scholar Awards, one to France and one to Romania. Brădăţan's work has been translated into more than twenty languages.

Costică Brădăţan has been a long-time reviewer for Times Literary Supplement and writes regularly essays, op-ed pieces, and book reviews for such publications as New York Times, Washington Post, New York Review of Books, Aeon, Commonweal Magazine, and the The American Scholar.

Costică Brădăţan is the founding editor and curator of a couple of book series: No limits (Columbia University Press) and Philosophical Filmmakers (Bloomsbury Publishing). He also serves as the philosophy/religion editor for the Los Angeles Review of Books.

== Awards ==
- The 2024 award of the PROSE Award in Philosophy.
- Premio di Saggistica “Città delle Rose” 2024.

== Bibliography ==
=== Books ===
- The Other Bishop Berkeley. An Exercise in Reenchantment (Fordham University Press, 2007) / O outro Bispo Berkeley. Um exercício de reencantamento Trad. Jaimir Conte. Chapecó, SC: Editora Argos, Florianópolis: Editora da UFSC, 2023.
- Dying for Ideas: the Dangerous Lives of the Philosophers (Bloomsbury, 2015) / Morrer por ideias. Os filósofos e suas vidas perigosas. Trad. Bruno Gambarotto. São Paulo: Grua Livros, 2020.
- In Praise of Failure. Four Lessons in Humility (Harvard University Press, 2023) / "Elogio do fracasso. Desafiando a cultura do successo". Tradução de Luiz Gonzaga Fragoso. Petrópolis, RJ: Editora Vozes, 2024.

=== Articles ===
- Brădăţan, Costică (January 2023). "Christ at the assembly line : how a year of factory work transformed Simone Weil". Commonweal. 150 (1): 32–39. (Note: Excerpted from In praise of failure.)
