= Stephan Roche =

Catalan nanoscience researcher

Stephan S. Roche is a French theoretical physicist, born in Grenoble, France in 1969. He is known for studying quantum transport theory in condensed matter, spin transport physics and devices simulation, and has worked in Grenoble (where he earned his PhD), Japan, Germany and Spain. Roche has been a Catalan Institution for Research and Advanced Studies research professor since 2009 and the head of the theoretical & computational nanoscience Group at the Catalan Institute of Nanoscience and Nanotechnology.

Roche works in the fields of theoretical and computational nanoscience, with expertise in quantum transport physics in Dirac materials (graphene & topological insulators) and 2D materials-based van der Waals heterostructures. He made contributions of charge, thermal and spin transport phenomena in complex and disordered condensed matter. He also works on the development of linear scaling quantum transport approaches, methods which are now connected with Artificial Intelligence methods.. He is co-founder of Apeiron Intelligence.

== Research and career ==
S. Roche has co-authored around 270 journal papers. He has been the Editor-in-Chief of J. Phys. Materials (IOP) since 2018 and the main organiser of the conference series GRAPHENE 20XX (www.grapheneconf.com) and, since 2011, QUANTUM MATTER 20XX (www.quantumconf.eu)

== Awards and honours ==
- Friedrich Wilhelm Bessel Award (Alexander Von-Humboldt Foundation, Germany) – 2009.

== Selected publications ==
- Fan, Zheyong; Garcia, José H.; Cummings, Aron W.; Barrios-Vargas, Jose Eduardo; Panhans, Michel; Harju, Ari; Ortmann, Frank; Roche, Stephan (April 2021). "Linear scaling quantum transport methodologies". Physics Reports. 903: 1–69. arXiv:1811.07387. Bibcode:2021PhR...903....1F. doi:10.1016/j.physrep.2020.12.001.
- Hong, Seokmo; Lee, Chang-Seok; Lee, Min-Hyun; Lee, Yeongdong; Ma, Kyung Yeol; Kim, Gwangwoo; Yoon, Seong In; Ihm, Kyuwook; Kim, Ki-Jeong; Shin, Tae Joo; Kim, Sang Won; Jeon, Eun-chae; Jeon, Hansol; Kim, Ju-Young; Lee, Hyung-Ik; Lee, Zonghoon; Antidormi, Aleandro; Roche, Stephan; Chhowalla, Manish; Shin, Hyeon-Jin; Shin, Hyeon Suk (25 June 2020). "Ultralow-dielectric-constant amorphous boron nitride". Nature. 582 (7813): 511–514. Bibcode:2020Natur.582..511H. doi:10.1038/s41586-020-2375-9. PMID 32581381.
- Benítez, L. Antonio; Savero Torres, Williams; Sierra, Juan F.; Timmermans, Matias; Garcia, Jose H.; Roche, Stephan; Costache, Marius V.; Valenzuela, Sergio O. (February 2020). "Tunable room-temperature spin galvanic and spin Hall effects in van der Waals heterostructures". Nature Materials. 19 (2): 170–175. arXiv:1908.07868. Bibcode:2020NatMa..19..170B. doi:10.1038/s41563-019-0575-1. PMID 31907417.
- Tuan, Dinh Van; Ortmann, Frank; Soriano, David; Valenzuela, Sergio O.; Roche, Stephan (November 2014). "Pseudospin-driven spin relaxation mechanism in graphene". Nature Physics. 10 (11): 857–863. arXiv:1804.10682. Bibcode:2014NatPh..10..857T. doi:10.1038/nphys3083.
