= Céline Péroux =

French astronomer

Céline Péroux is a French astronomer whose research focuses on the distribution of normal matter in the form of plasma in the intergalactic medium, and the "cosmic baryon cycle" of flow of this material into galaxies, through the formation and death of stars, and out of galaxies again. Educated in the UK, she has worked in Italy, France, and Germany, where she is a member of the scientific staff at the European Southern Observatory in Garching.

== Education and career ==
Péroux traveled from France to England for her undergraduate education. After completing Part III of the Mathematical Tripos at the University of Cambridge, she completed a Ph.D. at Cambridge in 2001. Her dissertation, Properties of Lyman-α absorbers at high-redshift, was jointly supervised by Mike Irwin and Richard G. McMahon.

After postdoctoral research as a Marie Curie Fellow in Trieste, Italy, she became a Fellow at the European Southern Observatory from 2003 to 2006. Since 2006 she has been a researcher for the French National Centre for Scientific Research (CNRS), associated with the Laboratoire d'astrophysique de Marseille. In 2018 and 2019 she worked at the Max Planck Institute for Astrophysics in Garching, and in 2019 she moved to the European Southern Observatory, initially in its Extremely Large Telescope project and since 2024 in its Very Large Telescope program.

She has served the International Astronomical Union as president of its Inter-Division B-H-J Commission J2 on the Intergalactic Medium for 2021–2024.

== Recognition ==
Péroux was a 2018 recipient of the Friedrich Wilhelm Bessel Research Award of the Alexander von Humboldt Foundation.

== Selected publications ==
- Péroux, C.; McMahon, R. G.; Storrie-Lombardi, L. J.; Irwin, M. J. (December 2003), "The evolution of Ω_{H_{I}} and the epoch of formation of damped Lyman α absorbers", Monthly Notices of the Royal Astronomical Society, 346 (4): 1103–1115, arXiv:astro-ph/0107045, doi:10.1111/j.1365-2966.2003.07129.x
- Péroux, Céline; Bouché, Nicolas; Kulkarni, Varsha P.; York, Donald G.; Vladilo, Giovanni (February 2011), "A SINFONI integral field spectroscopy survey for galaxy counterparts to damped Lyman α systems – I. New detections and limits for intervening and associated absorbers", Monthly Notices of the Royal Astronomical Society, 410 (4): 2237–2250, arXiv:1009.0025, Bibcode:2011MNRAS.410.2237P, doi:10.1111/j.1365-2966.2010.17598.x
- Péroux, Céline; Bouché, Nicolas; Kulkarni, Varsha P.; York, Donald G.; Vladilo, Giovanni (February 2012), "A SINFONI integral field spectroscopy survey for galaxy counterparts to damped Lyman α systems – III. Three additional detections", Monthly Notices of the Royal Astronomical Society, 419 (4): 3060–3073, arXiv:1110.0666, Bibcode:2012MNRAS.419.3060P, doi:10.1111/j.1365-2966.2011.19947.x
- Péroux, Céline; Zwaan, Martin A; Klitsch, Anne; Augustin, Ramona; Hamanowicz, Aleksandra; Rahmani, Hadi; Pettini, Max; Kulkarni, Varsha; Straka, Lorrie A; Biggs, Andy D; York, Donald G; Milliard, Bruno (January 2019), "Multiphase circumgalactic medium probed with MUSE and ALMA", Monthly Notices of the Royal Astronomical Society, 485 (2): 1595–1613, arXiv:1901.05217, doi:10.1093/mnras/stz202
- Péroux, Céline; Howk, J. Christopher (August 2020), "The Cosmic Baryon and Metal Cycles", Annual Review of Astronomy and Astrophysics, 58 (1): 363–406, arXiv:2011.01935, Bibcode:2020ARA&A..58..363P, doi:10.1146/annurev-astro-021820-120014
- Péroux, Céline; Nelson, Dylan; van de Voort, Freeke; Pillepich, Annalisa; Marinacci, Federico; Vogelsberger, Mark; Hernquist, Lars (December 2020), "Predictions for the angular dependence of gas mass flow rate and metallicity in the circumgalactic medium", Monthly Notices of the Royal Astronomical Society, 499 (2): 2462–2473, arXiv:2009.07809, doi:10.1093/mnras/staa2888
