= Ganpati Ramanath =

American engineer

Ganpati Ramanath is an American engineer, currently John Tod Horton Professor of Materials Science and Engineering at Rensselaer Polytechnic Institute and an Elected Fellow of the American Physical Society.
