= Srinivasan Ramakrishnan =

Indian condensed matter physicist

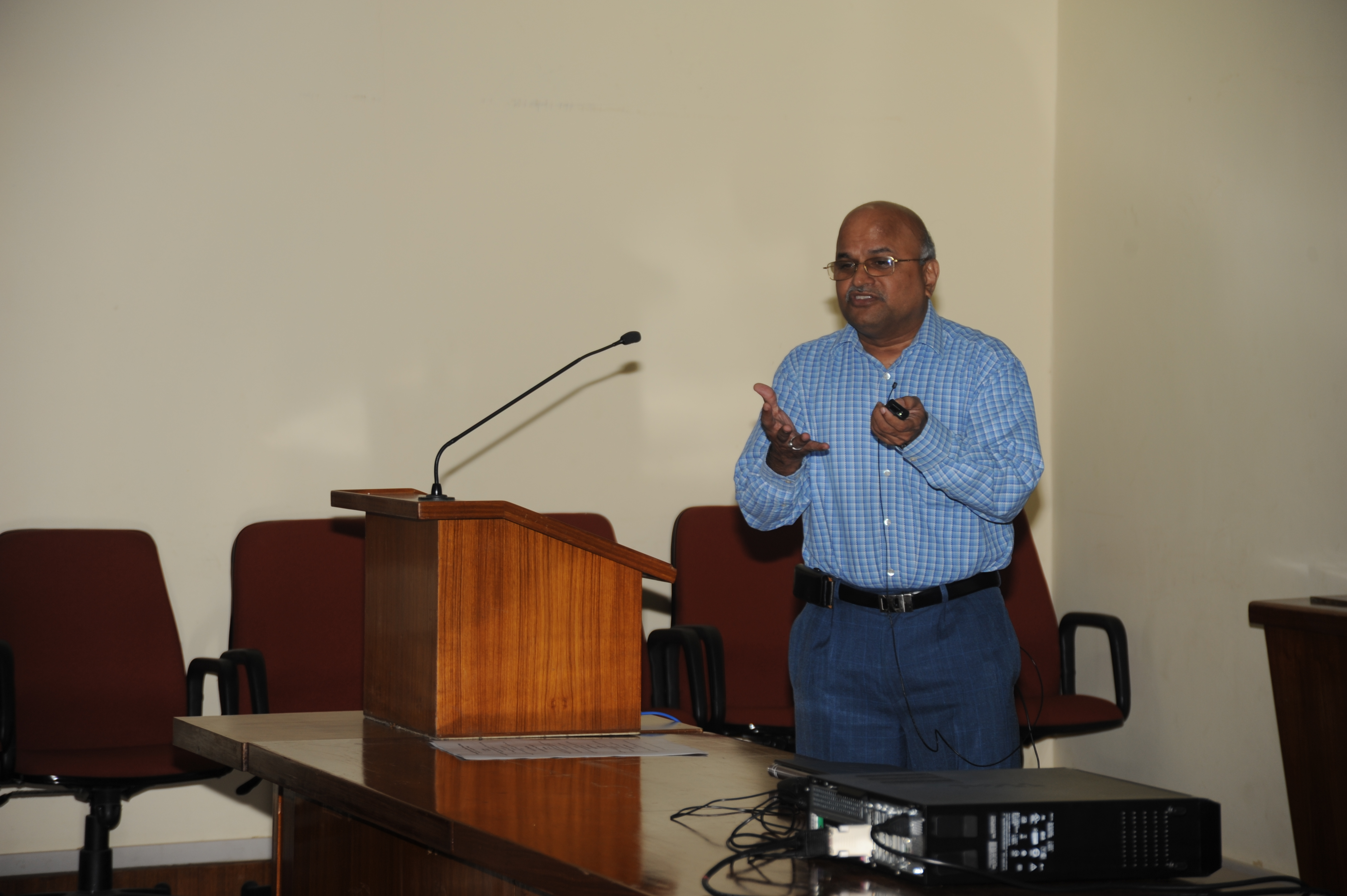
- Born: 22 December 1956; Tamil Nadu, India
- Education: PSG College of Technology; IIT Madras; University of Mumbai
- Known for: Studies on Ultra-low temperature physics and superconductivity
- Scientific career
- Fields: Condensed matter physics
- Workplaces: Tata Institute of Fundamental Research

Srinivasan Ramakrishnan is a condensed matter physicist working on experimental ultra-low temperature research. He was the director and distinguished professor of the Tata Institute of Fundamental Research (TIFR). Recently, he joined IISER Pune as a distinguished professor.

== Education ==
Srinivasan Ramakrishnan, did his B.Sc. degree in Applied Sciences from the PSG College of Technology at Coimbatore in 1977 and M.Sc. Physics in IIT Madras in 1979. He joined Tata Institute of Fundamental Research in 1979, enrolled at the University of Mumbai for doctoral studies on superconductivity in transition metal compounds and obtained his Ph.D. in 1985.

== Research ==
His efforts in Ultra Low Temperature (ULT) research led to the discovery of superconductivity in the Bismuth at 0.53 mK and was published in Science 2017. Temperature of the experiments in his laboratory range from 400 K to 40 μK.

== Awards ==
He is a recipient of the Friedrich Bessel research award (bestowed by Alexander von Humboldt Foundation) in November 2001. He was elected as a fellow of the Indian Academy of Sciences in 2002.
