= Sotiris Xantheas =

Sotiris S. Xantheas (Σωτηρης Ξανθεας) is a Laboratory Fellow in the Advanced Computing, Mathematics and Data Division at Pacific Northwest National Laboratory (PNNL) in Richland, WA and an Affiliate Professor, UW - PNNL Distinguished Faculty Fellow in the Department of Chemistry at the University of Washington in Seattle, WA, USA. He was an adjunct professor in the Department of Mathematics and Statistics at Washington State University in Pullman, WA, USA, and a specially appointed professor from 2019-2025 in the World Research Hub Initiative (WRHI) at the Institute of Science Tokyo (former Tokyo Technological Institute) in Tokyo, Japan. In 2022 he was awarded a Gauss Professorship from the Göttingen Academy of Sciences and Humanities.

At PNNL he is the Director of the Computational and Theoretical Chemistry Institute (CTCI). He also directs the Center for Scalable Predictive Methods for Excitations and Correlated Phenomena (SPEC), a project that is funded by the U.S. Department of Energy (DOE), Office of Science, Basic Energy Sciences, Chemical Sciences, Geosciences and Biosciences Division as part of the Computational Chemical Sciences (CCS) program. He is a co-Principal Investigation in the Molecular Theory project, which is funded from the Condensed Phase and Interfacial Molecular Science program from the same DOE Division. In addition, he run PNNL's Open Call Laboratory Directed Research and Development program, an effort that is intended to enable Early Career Science & Engineering staff to pursue innovative ideas that lie outside major Laboratory investments.

Xantheas is an Elected Fellow of the American Association for the Advancement of Science, the American Physical Society, and the Washington State Academy of Sciences (WSAS), a Marie Curie Fellow, a Fellow of the Japan Society for the Promotion of Science (JSPS) and a visiting Fellow at the Institute for Advanced Study at the Technical University of Munich at Garching, Germany. He is the recipient of the "Friedrich Wilhelm Bessel" Award from the Alexander von Humboldt Foundation in Bonn, Germany, and the Director’s Award for Exceptional Scientific Achievement at PNNL (twice). From 2023-2026 he served on the Board of Regents of the University of Peloponnese, Tripolis, Greece, as an elected external member.
