= Ronit Satchi-Fainaro =

Israeli cancer researcher

- רונית סצ'י-פאינרו
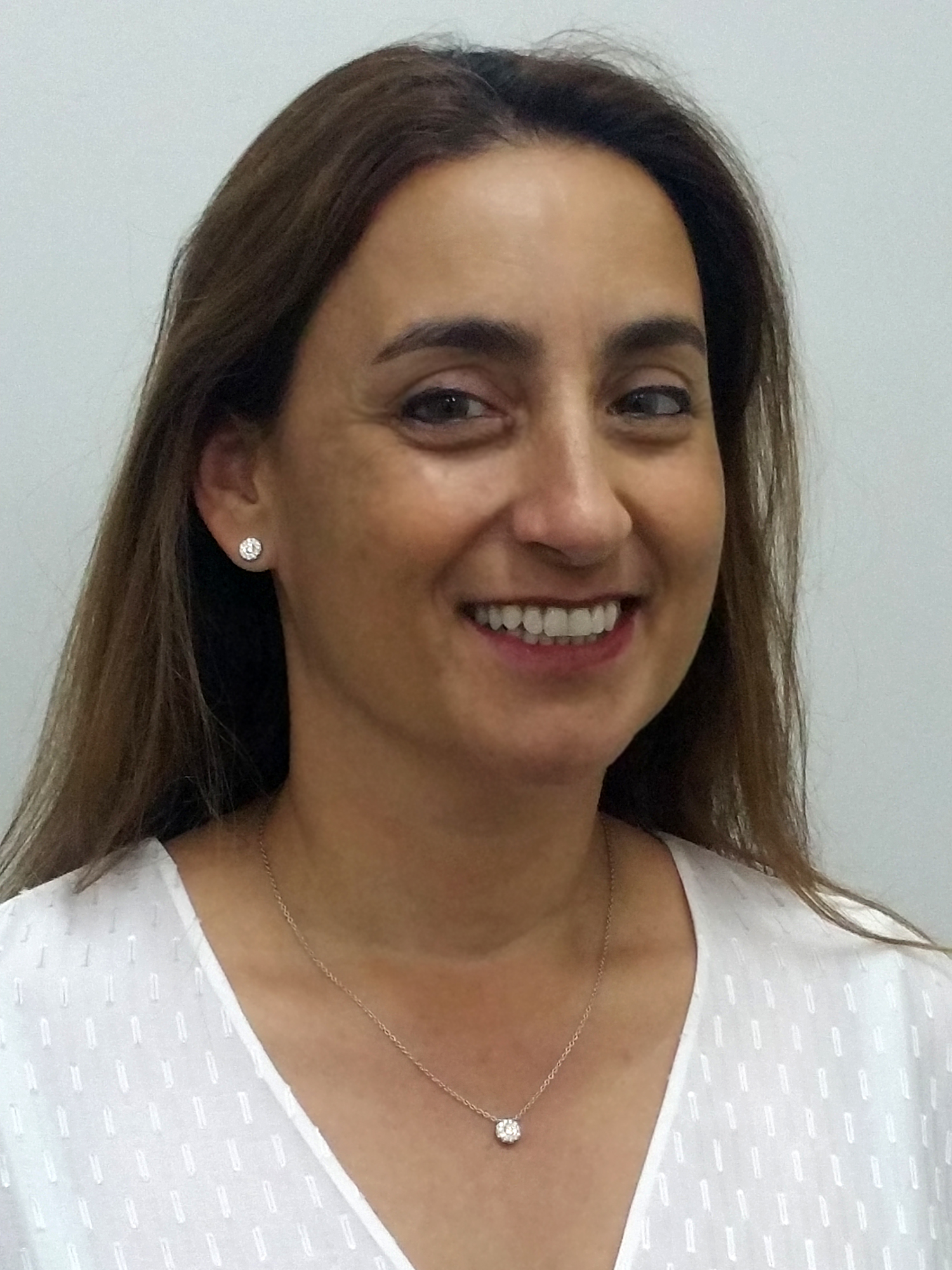
- Education: Hebrew University of Jerusalem (B.Pharm, 1995); University of London (PhD, 1999)
- Scientific career
- Fields: Cancer biology; Molecular genetics; Nanomedicine; 3D bioprinting
- Institutions: Tel Aviv University; Harvard Medical School; Boston Children's Hospital
- Website: The Satchi-Fainaro Lab

Ronit Satchi-Fainaro (Hebrew: רונית סצ'י-פאינרו; born October 22, 1971) is an Israeli cancer researcher at the Gray Faculty of Medical and Health Sciences at Tel Aviv University and the head of the Gray School of Medical Sciences. Her research focuses on understanding cancer dormancy, tumor–host interactions, angiogenesis, and metastasis in order to design targeted polymer-based therapeutics and nano-vaccines.

== Early life and education ==
Ronit Satchi-Fainaro was born in Tel Aviv, Israel, to parents who immigrated from Bulgaria. She is the second of two children. Between the ages of six and twelve, her family lived in Venezuela, where her parents managed a construction company. She graduated from the Herzliya Hebrew Gymnasium in Tel Aviv. She served in the Medical Corps at Tel HaShomer Medical Center during her military service; during this time, her father died of cancer.

Satchi-Fainaro earned her bachelor's degree in pharmacy at the Hebrew University of Jerusalem. She completed her doctorate in the laboratory of Ruth Duncan at the University of London in 1999. She later undertook postdoctoral research with Judah Folkman at Harvard University and Boston Children's Hospital in the United States.

== Career and research ==
Satchi-Fainaro has headed the Cancer and Nanomedicine Research Laboratory at Tel Aviv University's faculty of medicine since 2006 and is a faculty member in its Department of Physiology and Pharmacology. She was promoted to full professor in 2015. Since 2017, she has held the Hermann and Kurt Leon Chair in Nanoscience and Nanotechnologies. She is also the director of the Cancer Biology Research Center, the Kahn 3D Bioprinting Initiative, and has been a visiting professor at Harvard University since 2007 and at the University of Lisbon since 2021. In 2025, she was appointed head of the Gray School of Medical Sciences.

Satchi-Fainaro's research focuses on three main areas of cancer research:

- The development of three-dimensional models of brain, bone, breast, ovary, melanoma, prostate, gastroinestinal and lung tumors, taken directly from the operating room. These 3D tumor models include both the patient’s cancer cells and cells from the tumor microenvironment, such as endothelial cells that form blood vessels to nourish the tumor, connective tissue cells, and immune cells. These models enable the study of molecular relationships between various cell types and the characterization of specific markers expressed in these cells, which may serve as targets for diagnosis and targeted therapy.
- The development of nano-bio-therapeutic agents specifically designed to disrupt interactions between cancer cells and the cells within the tumor microenvironment. These cells are essential for tumor nutrition, growth, and the enhanced ability to metastasize. The nanometric drugs consist of a polymeric carrier linked to bio-mimetic agents that inhibit the translation of RNA to proteins (RNA interference), that are critical to cell survival, combined with various drugs that act synergistically and selectively within the tumor.
- The creation of nanometric fluorescent sensors in the near infra-red range, which are injected into the body to accurately detect the location of cancer cells and provide real-time reporting on drug release and activation within the tumor, for diagnostics as well as image-guided surgery probes.

Satchi-Fainaro has published over 170 peer-reviewed articles, with an H-index of 65, edited 2 books, 13 book chapters, 95 patents applications/granted.

== Awards and honors ==
- Chevening Scholarship (1995)
- Rothschild Fellowship (2001)
- Fulbright scholarship (2001)
- President of the Israel Chapter of the Controlled Release Society (2010–2015)
- European Research Council (2014) ERC Consolidator award
- 3D Printing Industry Award (2021)
- Elected Fellow of the Controlled Release Society (2022)
- Elected fellow of AIMBE
- Tenne Family Prize for Nanoscale Sciences (2024)
- CRS Samyang Award (2025)

== Selected publications ==
- Satchi-Fainaro, R., Puder, M., Davies, J. W., Tran, H. T., Sampson, D. A., Greene, A. K., Corfas, G., & Folkman, J. (2004). Targeting angiogenesis with a conjugate of HPMA copolymer and TNP-470. Nature medicine, 10(3), 255–261. https://doi.org/10.1038/nm1002
- Satchi-Fainaro, R., Mamluk, R., Wang, L., Short, S. M., Nagy, J. A., Feng, D., Dvorak, A. M., Dvorak, H. F., Puder, M., Mukhopadhyay, D., & Folkman, J. (2005). Inhibition of vessel permeability by TNP-470 and its polymer conjugate, caplostatin. Cancer cell, 7(3), 251–261. https://doi.org/10.1016/j.ccr.2005.02.007
- Tiram, G., Segal, E., Krivitsky, A., Shreberk-Hassidim, R., Ferber, S., Ofek, P., Udagawa, T., Edry, L., Shomron, N., Roniger, M., Kerem, B., Shaked, Y., Aviel-Ronen, S., Barshack, I., Calderón, M., Haag, R., & Satchi-Fainaro, R. (2016). Identification of Dormancy-Associated MicroRNAs for the Design of Osteosarcoma-Targeted Dendritic Polyglycerol Nanopolyplexes. ACS nano, 10(2), 2028–2045. https://doi.org/10.1021/acsnano.5b06189
- Conniot, J., Scomparin, A., Peres, C., Yeini, E., Pozzi, S., Matos, A. I., Kleiner, R., Moura, L. I. F., Zupančič, E., Viana, A. S., Doron, H., Gois, P. M. P., Erez, N., Jung, S., Satchi-Fainaro, R., & Florindo, H. F. (2019). Immunization with mannosylated nanovaccines and inhibition of the immune-suppressing microenvironment sensitizes melanoma to immune checkpoint modulators. Nature nanotechnology, 14(9), 891–901. https://doi.org/10.1038/s41565-019-0512-0
- Yeini, E., Ofek, P., Pozzi, S., Albeck, N., Ben-Shushan, D., Tiram, G., Golan, S., Kleiner, R., Sheinin, R., Israeli Dangoor, S., Reich-Zeliger, S., Grossman, R., Ram, Z., Brem, H., Hyde, T. M., Magod, P., Friedmann-Morvinski, D., Madi, A., & Satchi-Fainaro, R. (2021). P-selectin axis plays a key role in microglia immunophenotype and glioblastoma progression. Nature communications, 12(1), 1912. https://doi.org/10.1038/s41467-021-22186-0
- Neufeld, L., Yeini, E., Reisman, N., Shtilerman, Y., Ben-Shushan, D., Pozzi, S., Madi, A., Tiram, G., Eldar-Boock, A., Ferber, S., Grossman, R., Ram, Z., & Satchi-Fainaro, R. (2021). Microengineered perfusable 3D-bioprinted glioblastoma model for in vivo mimicry of tumor microenvironment. Science advances, 7(34), eabi9119. https://doi.org/10.1126/sciadv.abi9119
- Acúrcio, R. C., Kleiner, R., Vaskovich-Koubi, D., Carreira, B., Liubomirski, Y., Palma, C., Yeheskel, A., Yeini, E., Viana, A. S., Ferreira, V., Araújo, C., Mor, M., Freund, N. T., Bacharach, E., Gonçalves, J., Toister-Achituv, M., Fabregue, M., Matthieu, S., Guerry, C., Zarubica, A., … Satchi-Fainaro, R. (2024). Intranasal Multiepitope PD-L1-siRNA-Based Nanovaccine: The Next-Gen COVID-19 Immunotherapy. Advanced science (Weinheim, Baden-Wurttemberg, Germany), 11(40), e2404159. https://doi.org/10.1002/advs.202404159
- Koshrovski-Michael, S., Ajamil, D. R., Dey, P., Kleiner, R., Tevet, S., Epshtein, Y., Green Buzhor, M., Khoury, R., Pozzi, S., Shenbach-Koltin, G., Yeini, E., Woythe, L., Blau, R., Scomparin, A., Barshack, I., Florindo, H. F., Lazar, S., Albertazzi, L., Amir, R. J., & Satchi-Fainaro, R. (2024). Two-in-one nanoparticle platform induces a strong therapeutic effect of targeted therapies in P-selectin-expressing cancers. Science advances, 10(50), eadr4762. https://doi.org/10.1126/sciadv.adr4762
- Neufeld, L., Yeini, E., Pozzi, S., & Satchi-Fainaro, R. (2022). 3D bioprinted cancer models: from basic biology to drug development. Nature reviews. Cancer, 22(12), 679–692. https://doi.org/10.1038/s41568-022-00514-w
