= Ran Nathan =

Israeli biologist, ornithologist, and academic

- רן נתן
- Born: April 1, 1962 (age 64)
- Education: The Hebrew University of Jerusalem; Princeton University
- Known for: Theory of Movement Ecology; Long-distance dispersal (LDD)
- Scientific career
- Fields: Ecology
- Workplaces: The Hebrew University of Jerusalem; Minerva Center for Movement Ecology
- Doctoral advisor: Uriel Safriel; Imanuel Noy-Meir

Ran Nathan (Hebrew: רן נתן; born 1962) is an Israeli biologist, ornithologist, and academic.

He is an ecologist who holds the Adelina and Massimo Della Pergola Chair of life Sciences at the Hebrew University of Jerusalem in the Department of Ecology, Evolution and Behavior where he leads the Movement Ecology Lab. Additionally, Nathan is the director of the Minerva Center for Movement Ecology and the co-founding co-Editor-in-Chief of the free-access journal Movement Ecology (BioMed Central).

His work focuses on various aspects of movement ecology, including dispersal (and long-distance dispersal in particular), migration, foraging, navigation, flight aerodynamics, animal behavior, social interactions, invasive species, disease spread by avian species, gene flow, plant-animal interactions and plant recruitment.

== Research interests ==
=== Long-distance dispersal ===
Nathan's earlier work (since 1999) focused on seed dispersal, and long-distance dispersal (LDD) in particular. In a series of studies, he and his colleagues demonstrated the strength of the mechanistic approach in understanding seed dispersal and plant dynamics, as well as the importance of rare long-distance dispersal events in plants (Nathan 2006 Science), their underlying mechanisms and their role in determining spread rates of plants in future environments.

=== Movement ecology ===
In an interview for Science Watch (October 2010), Nathan revealed that the idea to establish movement ecology as a new field of research was born in 2002, when he was a first-year faculty member supervising one student on seed dispersal and another on bird migration, facing the question “what name should I call my research group”? This has led him to wonder why different movement phenomena are studied in isolation from each other, and why there is still no general unifying theory of organismal movement. He then decided to call his research group "movement ecology", and later on noticed this term has already been used in the literature, but very occasionally at the time and never in the context of a unifying research paradigm.

In 2006, Nathan initiated and led an international group at the Israel Institute for Advanced Studies in Jerusalem which has set the foundation for development of the field of movement ecology as a new integration of movement research. In 2008, he edited a Special Feature on Movement Ecology for the Proceedings of the National Academy of USA. This collection included a perspective paper introducing the basic concepts and a framework for integrating movement research. In 2012, Nathan established the Minerva Center for Movement Ecology supported by the Minerva Foundation and the Hebrew University of Jerusalem as a German-Israeli interdisciplinary research center for studying movement ecology. Together with Prof. Sivan Toledo (Computer Sciences, Tel Aviv University), he developed a revolutionary wildlife tracking system called ATLAS (Advanced Tracking and Localization of Animals in real-life Systems), a portable, affordable tracking system capable of automatically and simultaneously tracking a large number of small animals (20 grams and less) in high accuracy and high sampling frequency. In 2013, Nathan co-founded a new open-access journal, Movement Ecology (BioMed Central), which has become a major forum for publishing studies on the movement of animals and plants.

== Education, appointments, professional activity and honors ==
=== Education ===
- Bachelor of Science in Biology (with distinction), The Hebrew University of Jerusalem, Israel, 1989–1992.
- Ph.D. in Ecology (Supervisors: Profs. U. N. Safriel and I. Noy-Meir), The Hebrew University of Jerusalem, Israel, Department of Evolution, Systematics and Ecology (now Department of Ecology, Evolution and Behavior, 1994–2000
- Post-Doctoral Fellow and Research Associate (Supervisor: Prof. S. A. Levin), Princeton University, Department of Ecology and Evolutionary Biology, 1999–2001

=== Appointments ===
- Lecturer, Ben Gurion University of the Negev, Israel, 2001–2003
- Senior Lecturer, Ben Gurion University of the Negev, Israel, 2003
- Senior Lecturer, The Hebrew University of Jerusalem, Israel, 2003–2005
- Associate Professor, The Hebrew University of Jerusalem, Israel, 2005–2009
- Full Professor, The Hebrew University of Jerusalem, Israel, 2009–present

=== Selected professional activities ===
- Initiator & group leader, Movement Ecology Group (International Research Group at the Israel Institute for Advanced Studies, Jerusalem, Israel), 2006–2007
- Elected Chair, Department of Evolution, Systematics and Ecology (now Department of Ecology, Evolution. and Behavior), The Hebrew University of Jerusalem, Israel, 2007–2009
- Elected Chairman, Alexander Silberman Institute of Life Sciences, The Hebrew University of Jerusalem, Israel, 2009–2011
- Director, Minerva Center for Movement Ecology, Israel, 2012–Present
- Visiting Professor, Murdoch University, Australia, 2013
- Vice Dean for Appointments, Faculty of Science, The Hebrew University of Jerusalem, Israel, 2013–2016
- Co-founding co-Editor-in-Chief of Movement Ecology (BMC & Springer, Open-Access)
- Vice Chair, Gordon Research Conference on Animal Movement Ecology, US, March 2017
- Recipient of various research grants: overall raised >11.5 million USD in 42 research grants, 1999–2016
- Invited plenary/keynote speaker in 30 international conferences, >100 invited seminars/lecture, as of Nov. 2016
- Published 112 peer-reviewed publications, including 93 journal articles, 11 book chapters and 8 proceeding papers, as of Nov. 2016

=== Selected honors ===
- The Yoram Ben-Porath Prize for Outstanding Young Researcher, Hebrew University of Jerusalem, Israel, 2005
- The Friedrich W. Bessel Award, Alexander von Humboldt Foundation, Germany, 2006
- Adelina and Massimo Della Pergola Chair of Life Sciences, 2011
- International Collaboration Award, Australian Research Council, 2011
- High-end Foreign Experts Program, Chinese Academy of Sciences, Beijing, China, 2015

== Selected publications ==
- Nathan, R., and H. C. Muller-Landau. (2000). Spatial patterns of seed dispersal, their determinants and consequences for recruitment. Trends in Ecology & Evolution 15:278-285.
- Nathan, R., G. G. Katul, H. S. Horn, S. M. Thomas, R. Oren, R. Avissar, S. W. Pacala, and S. A. Levin. (2002). Mechanisms of long-distance dispersal of seeds by wind. Nature 418:409-413.
- Nathan, R. (2006). Long-distance dispersal of plants. Science 313:786-788.
- Nathan, R., W. M. Getz, E. Revilla, M. Holyoak, R. Kadmon, D. Saltz, and P. E. Smouse. (2008). A movement ecology paradigm for unifying organismal movement research. Proc. Natl. Acad. Sci. USA, 105:19052-19059.
- Nathan, R., F. M. Schurr, O. Spiegel, O. Steinitz, A. Trakhtenbrot, and A. Tsoar. (2008). Mechanisms of long-distance seed dispersal. Trends in Ecology & Evolution 23:638-647.
- Nathan R., N. Horvitz, Y. He, A. Kuparinen, F. M. Schurr, and G. G. Katul. (2011). Spread of North-American wind-dispersed trees in future environments. Ecology Letters 14:211-219.
- Tsoar, A., R. Nathan, Y. Bartan, A. Vyssotski, G. Dell'Omo, and N. Ulanovsky. (2011). Large-scale navigational map in a mammal. Proc. Natl. Acad. Sci. USA, 108:E718-E724.
- Nathan, R., O. Spiegel, S. Fortmann-Roe, R. Harel, M. Wikelski, and W. M. Getz. (2012). Using tri-axial acceleration data to identify behavioral modes of free-ranging animals: general concepts and tools illustrated for Griffon Vultures. J. Exp. Biol. 215:986-996.
- Horvitz, N., N. Sapir, F. Liechti, R. Avissar, I. Mahrer, and R. Nathan. (2014). The gliding speed of migrating birds: Slow and safe or fast and risky? Ecology Letters 17:760-769.
- Shohami, D., and R. Nathan. (2014). Fire-induced population reduction and landscape opening increases gene flow via pollen dispersal in Pinus halepensis. Molecular Ecology 23:70-81.
