= Boris Murmann =

American electrical engineer

- Education: University of California, Berkeley
- Known for: Solid-state electronics, low power and smart power ASICs, CMOS technology
- Awards: IEEE Fellow (2015), Friedrich Bessel Research Award (2012), Agilent Early Career Professor Award (2009)
- Scientific career
- Fields: Electrical Engineering
- Workplaces: Stanford University
- Thesis: Digital Calibration for Low-Power High-Performance A/D Conversion
- Doctoral advisor: Bernhard E. Boser (UC Berkeley)

Boris Murmann is a professor in the Department of Electrical Engineering at University of Hawaii.

He is co-director and a founding faculty of the Stanford SystemX Alliance. He is the faculty director of Stanford's System Prototyping Facility (SPF).

Murmann's research areas include mixed-signal integrated circuit design, sensor interfaces, data converters and custom circuits for machine learning, and solid-state electronics.

In 2018, Murmann holds more than 5 patents.

== Education ==
Murmann received his Ph.D. in Electrical Engineering from University of California, Berkeley in 2003. A M.S. in Electrical Engineering from Santa Clara University in 1999, “with Distinction”. His bachelor in Communications Engineering, from the Fachhochschule of the German Telekom in 1994. Murmann is originally from Germany.

== Work and Academic Career ==
Murmann joined Stanford University in 2004. From 1994 to 1997, he was with Neutron Microelectronics, Germany, where he developed low-power and smart-power ASICs in automotive CMOS technology. Since 2004, he has worked as a consultant with numerous Silicon Valley companies.

Murmann has participated on several technical advisory boards within Silicon Valley. He participates on several committees for professional groups, such as IEEE, ISSCC, ESSCC, etc.

== Awards and honors ==
- IEEE Fellow, 2015
- Friedrich Wilhelm Bessel Research Award, 2012
- Agilent Early Career Professor Award, 2009
