= Wonpil Im =

- 임원필
- Education: Hanyang University; Cornell University.
- Scientific career
- Fields: Biophysics
- Workplaces: University of Kansas; Lehigh University
- Doctoral advisor: Benoît Roux

- Wonpil Im
- Hangul: 임원필
- RR: Im Wonpil
- MR: Im Wŏnp'il

Wonpil Im is professor of Biological Sciences and Bioengineering at the Lehigh University and has been named the Presidential Endowed Chair in Health Science and Engineering. He has previously taught at University of Kansas. Wonpil Im has been appointed to KIAS scholar in 2016. Wonpil Im was a recipient of the 2017 Friedrich Wilhelm Bessel Research Award in Bioinformatics and Theoretical Biology, awarded by the Alexander von Humboldt Foundation.

== Career ==
Im obtained B.Sc. and M.Sc. in chemistry from the Hanyang University in 1994 and 1996, respectively. In 1997, he moved to Montreal, Canada and started his Ph.D. studies in chemistry at University of Montreal under the guidance of professor Benoît Roux. He received his Ph.D. in 2002 from Cornell University.

== Research ==
His laboratory at the Lehigh University mostly uses theoretical/computational methods, such as classical molecular dynamics, to chemical and physical problems in biology and material science. Im's group has led the development of the CHARMM-GUI webserver, a widely used tool that makes generating the inputs required to run molecular dynamics simulations straightforward and more accessible.

== Awards and fellowships ==
- Friedrich Wilhelm Bessel Research Award, Alexander von Humboldt Foundation (2016)
- Korea Institute for Advanced Study scholar (2017)
