= Ludmilla Aristilde =

- Born: Haiti
- Education: University of California, Berkeley; Cornell University
- Scientific career
- Workplaces: Northwestern University; Cornell University
- Thesis: A mechanistic investigation of the environmental chemodynamics of fluoroquinolone antibiotics (2008)

Ludmilla Aristilde is an American engineer who is a professor at Northwestern University. Her research considers environmental biochemistry and bioengineering. She was awarded an Alexander von Humboldt Foundation Bessel Research Award.

== Early life and education ==
Aristilde grew up in Port-Au-Prince, Haiti. She became interested in environmental science because of the environmental devastation she witnessed as a child, including deforestation and water pollution. Dirty water drove an epidemic of cholera; deforestation caused flooding and erosion. She studied the science of earth systems at Cornell University, where, as a keen artist, she also completed a Bachelor of Fine Arts. She moved to University of California, Berkeley for graduate studies, where she majored in environmental engineering and became interested in toxicology. She stayed in Berkeley for her doctoral research, investigating the chemodynamics of fluoroquinolone antibiotics with Garrison Sposito. Fluoroquinolone antibiotics have a broad spectrum of antibacterial activity, but impact biogeochemical processes through soil bacteria. As the antibiotics strongly bond to soils, they impact their degradation and bioavailability. Aristilde combined experimental and theoretical approaches to understand the environmental impacts of ciprofloxacin. She was a postdoctoral researcher in Grenoble, where she held a Fulbright Program scholarship and developed spectroscopic techniques to understand interactions between organic materials and minerals. She completed a National Science Foundation postdoc at Princeton University, where she learned about metabolomics and molecular biology, and joined Cornell University in 2018.

== Research and career ==
Aristilde joined Northwestern University in 2019. Her research uses molecular and computational approaches to understand the environmental and biological impacts of chemical systems. She looks to use nature's innate ability to breakdown chemicals to get rid of pollutants. She has demonstrated that wastewater can breakdown plastics, and use the products for fuel.

In 2021, Aristilde was awarded an Alexander von Humboldt Foundation Bessel Research Award. As part of the award, she worked with the University of Tübingen to explore new strategies to recover carbon from biological waste.

Aristilde's research looks to understand the metabolism of organic systems in environmental bacteria, the dynamics of nutrient-cycling enzymes and the physical chemistry of biomolecules. She has demonstrated that soil bacteria (Pseudomonas putida) reorganize their metabolism to survive on lignin, which could inform the design of microbial factories to convert plant waste into sustainable fuels. The Pseudomonas putida achieve this by regulating their metabolic pathways to extract energy from lignin without exhausting itself. Aristilde has also found that an iron oxide mineral called ferrihydrite has the ability to form chemical and hydrogen bonds with its surface material in order to grab and trap carbon molecules. Aristilde looks to further understand how other minerals trap carbon across different climates, and how the structure of the minerals affects their ability to interact with organic matter.

== Selected publications ==
- Rebecca A Wilkes; Aristilde, Ludmilla (2017). "Degradation and metabolism of synthetic plastics and associated products by Pseudomonas sp.: capabilities and challenges". Journal of Applied Microbiology. 123 (3): 582–593. doi:10.1111/jam.13472. PMID 28419654. Wikidata Q38728815.
- Aristilde, Ludmilla; Claire Marichal; Jocelyne Miéhé-Brendlé; Lanson, Bruno; Charlet, Laurent (2010). "Interactions of oxytetracycline with a smectite clay: a spectroscopic study with molecular simulations". Environmental Science & Technology. 44 (20): 7839–7845. doi:10.1021/es102136y. PMID 20866047. Wikidata Q42877496.
- H. Richter; B. Molitor; H. Wei; W. Chen; Aristilde, Ludmilla; Angenent, Largus Theodora (2016). "Ethanol production in syngas-fermenting Clostridium ljungdahlii is controlled by thermodynamics rather than by enzyme expression". Energy & Environmental Science. 9 (7): 2392–2399. doi:10.1039/c6ee01108j. Wikidata Q61942090.
