= Paula Diaconescu =

Inorganic chemist

- Education: University of Bucharest (B.S.); Massachusetts Institute of Technology (Ph.D.)
- Scientific career
- Workplaces: University of California, Los Angeles
- Thesis: Arene bridged diuranium compounds supported by amide and ketimide ligands (2003)
- Doctoral advisor: Christopher C. Cummins

Paula L. Diaconescu is a Romanian-American chemistry professor at the University of California, Los Angeles. She is known for her research on the synthesis of redox active transition metal complexes, the synthesis of lanthanide complexes, metal-induced small molecule activation, and polymerization reactions. She is a fellow of the American Association for the Advancement of Science.

== Biography ==
Diaconescu was born in Romania and received a Bachelor of Science degree from the University of Bucharest in 1998 conducting research on transition metal complexes and f-block metals. In 2003, Diaconescu received a PhD in chemistry from the Massachusetts Institute of Technology working with Christopher C. Cummins on uranium chemistry. Before joining the faculty at UCLA in 2005, she spent two years as a postdoctoral fellow at the California Institute of Technology with Robert Grubbs. As of August 2020, Diaconescu was chosen to lead the $1.8 million National Science Foundation (NSF) Center for Integrated Catalysis. The goal of the CIC was to simulate biological systems at play in the formation of synthetic chemical catalytic processes. Integrated Catalysis aims to combine spatial and temporal control in order to synthesize polymers with high complexity in a single reactor.

== Research ==
While Diaconescu is best known for her work on the reactivity of early transition metals, lanthanides, and actinides, she has also contributed to the field of redox active ligand systems for small molecule activation. Her group has exploited ferrocene's electronic and redox properties to enable catalytic transformations with electrophilic transition metal centers. Diaconescu's research on redox active systems is studying how ferrocene's electronic and redox properties when strategically incorporated into a ligand affect the reactivity of d-block metal complexes. This extends to redox switchable catalysis and small molecule activation with applications in polyaniline nanofiber supporting metal catalysis and bioorganometallic polymers. She recognized that redox-switchable catalysis can generate multiple catalytically active species with varying reactivity. The idea is that a compound can have orthogonal reactivity between the oxidized and reduced forms of the catalyst. The ring-opening polymerization of cyclic ethers and esters as well as the polymerization of alkenes has been exploited with catalysts containing ferrocene.

== Selected publications ==
- Broderick, Erin M.; Guo, Neng; Vogel, Carola S.; Xu, Cuiling; Sutter, Jörg; Miller, Jeffrey T.; Meyer, Karsten; Mehrkhodavandi, Parisa; Diaconescu, Paula L. (22 June 2011). "Redox Control of a Ring-Opening Polymerization Catalyst". Journal of the American Chemical Society. 133 (24): 9278–9281. Bibcode:2011JAChS.133.9278B. doi:10.1021/ja2036089. ISSN 0002-7863. PMID 21604745.
- Diaconescu, Paula L.; Arnold, Polly L.; Baker, Thomas A.; Mindiola, Daniel J.; Cummins, Christopher C. (1 June 2000). "Arene-Bridged Diuranium Complexes: Inverted Sandwiches Supported by δ Backbonding". Journal of the American Chemical Society. 122 (25): 6108–6109. Bibcode:2000JAChS.122.6108D. doi:10.1021/ja994484e. ISSN 0002-7863.
- Broderick, Erin M.; Guo, Neng; Vogel, Carola S.; Xu, Cuiling; Sutter, Jörg; Miller, Jeffrey T.; Meyer, Karsten; Mehrkhodavandi, Parisa; Diaconescu, Paula L. (22 June 2011). "Redox Control of a Ring-Opening Polymerization Catalyst". Journal of the American Chemical Society. 133 (24): 9278–9281. Bibcode:2011JAChS.133.9278B. doi:10.1021/ja2036089. ISSN 0002-7863. PMID 21604745.

== Awards ==
Diaconescu received a Sloan Fellowship in 2009, and received the Humboldt Foundation's Friedrich Wilhelm Bessel Research Award in 2014. In 2015, she was named a Guggenheim Fellow, and Diaconescu was named a fellow of the American Association for the Advancement of Science in 2019.
