= Panayiota Poirazi =

Neurobiologist

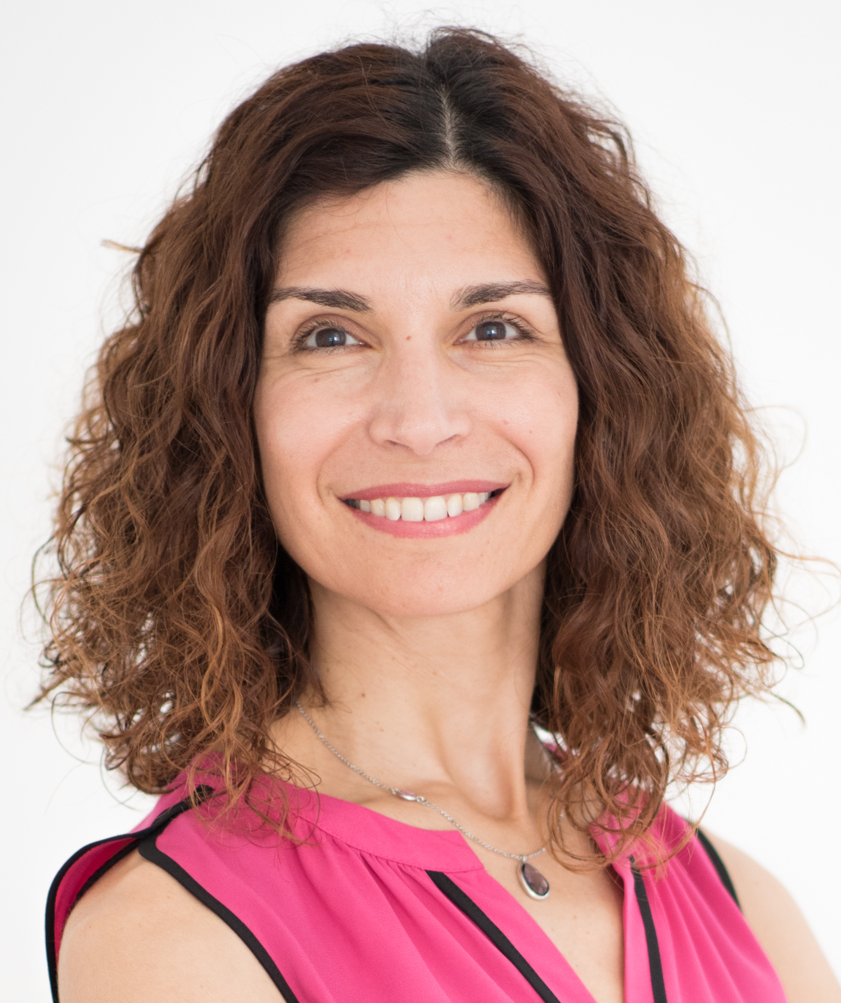
- Born: August 6, 1974 (age 52); Cyprus
- Education: University of Cyprus, Nicosia, Cyprus; University of Southern California, Los Angeles, California, USA
- Known for: modelling dendritic computations
- Scientific career
- Fields: Neuroscience, Computational Neuroscience
- Workplaces: Foundation of Research and Technology-Hellas (FORTH), Institute of Molecular Biology and Biotechnology (IMBB)
- Thesis: Contributions of active dendrites and structural plasticity to the neural substrate for learning and memory (2000)
- Website: http://www.dendrites.gr/

Panayiota Poirazi is a neuroscientist known for her work in modelling dendritic computations. She is an elected member of the European Molecular Biology Organization (EMBO).

== Education and career ==
Poirazi studied at the University of Cyprus from 1992 until 1996. She earned an M.S. from the University of Southern California in 1998, and went on to earn her Ph.D. from there in 2000. Following her Ph.D., she worked at the Alexander Fleming Instite of Immunology in Greece until 2001, when she moved to the Foundation for Research and Technology-Hellas (FORTH) in Crete, Greece in 2004. As of 2021, she is the director of research at the Institute of Molecular Biology and Biotechnology (IMBB) at the Foundation for Research and Technology-Hellas (FORTH).

== Research ==
Poirazi is known for her work in neurobiology where she focuses on dendrites, the portion of a neuron that propagates signals. Her early research generated predictive models of how active dendrites and structural plasticity enhance storage capacity in single neurons. She has used biophysical models of pyramidal neurons to show that dendrites of these cells integrate inputs in a sigmoidal manner, enabling the neurons to act as two-layer neural network devices. Poirazi has built a circuit-level model of the hippocampus that shows how memories are linked through time. She has developed and applied biophysical models to explain how human neurons compute information, with a focus on solving the XOR problem.

== Selected publications ==
- Poirazi, Panayiota; Brannon, Terrence; Mel, Bartlett W. (March 2003). "Pyramidal Neuron as Two-Layer Neural Network". Neuron. 37 (6): 989–999. doi:10.1016/s0896-6273(03)00149-1. PMID 12670427. S2CID 1680778.
- Poirazi, Panayiota; Mel, Bartlett W. (March 2001). "Impact of Active Dendrites and Structural Plasticity on the Memory Capacity of Neural Tissue". Neuron. 29 (3): 779–796. doi:10.1016/s0896-6273(01)00252-5. PMID 11301036. S2CID 14303314.
- Zhou, Yu; Won, Jaejoon; Karlsson, Mikael Guzman; Zhou, Miou; Rogerson, Thomas; Balaji, Jayaprakash; Neve, Rachael; Poirazi, Panayiota; Silva, Alcino J (November 2009). "CREB regulates excitability and the allocation of memory to subsets of neurons in the amygdala". Nature Neuroscience. 12 (11): 1438–1443. doi:10.1038/nn.2405. PMC 2783698. PMID 19783993.
- Poirazi, Panayiota; Brannon, Terrence; Mel, Bartlett W. (March 2003). "Arithmetic of Subthreshold Synaptic Summation in a Model CA1 Pyramidal Cell". Neuron. 37 (6): 977–987. doi:10.1016/s0896-6273(03)00148-x. PMID 12670426. S2CID 15742277.
- Richards, Blake A.; Lillicrap, Timothy P.; Beaudoin, Philippe; Bengio, Yoshua; Bogacz, Rafal; Christensen, Amelia; Clopath, Claudia; Costa, Rui Ponte; de Berker, Archy; Ganguli, Surya; Gillon, Colleen J.; Hafner, Danijar; Kepecs, Adam; Kriegeskorte, Nikolaus; Latham, Peter; Lindsay, Grace W.; Miller, Kenneth D.; Naud, Richard; Pack, Christopher C.; Poirazi, Panayiota; Roelfsema, Pieter; Sacramento, João; Saxe, Andrew; Scellier, Benjamin; Schapiro, Anna C.; Senn, Walter; Wayne, Greg; Yamins, Daniel; Zenke, Friedemann; Zylberberg, Joel; Therien, Denis; Kording, Konrad P. (November 2019). "A deep learning framework for neuroscience". Nature Neuroscience. 22 (11): 1761–1770. doi:10.1038/s41593-019-0520-2. PMC 7115933. PMID 31659335.

== Awards and honors ==
In 2017, Poirazi was elected a member of the European Molecular Biology Organization. In 2018, she received a Friedrich Wilhelm Bessel Research Award from the Alexander von Humboldt Foundation.
