= Ashraf Brik =

Israeli chemist and professor

- אשרף בריק
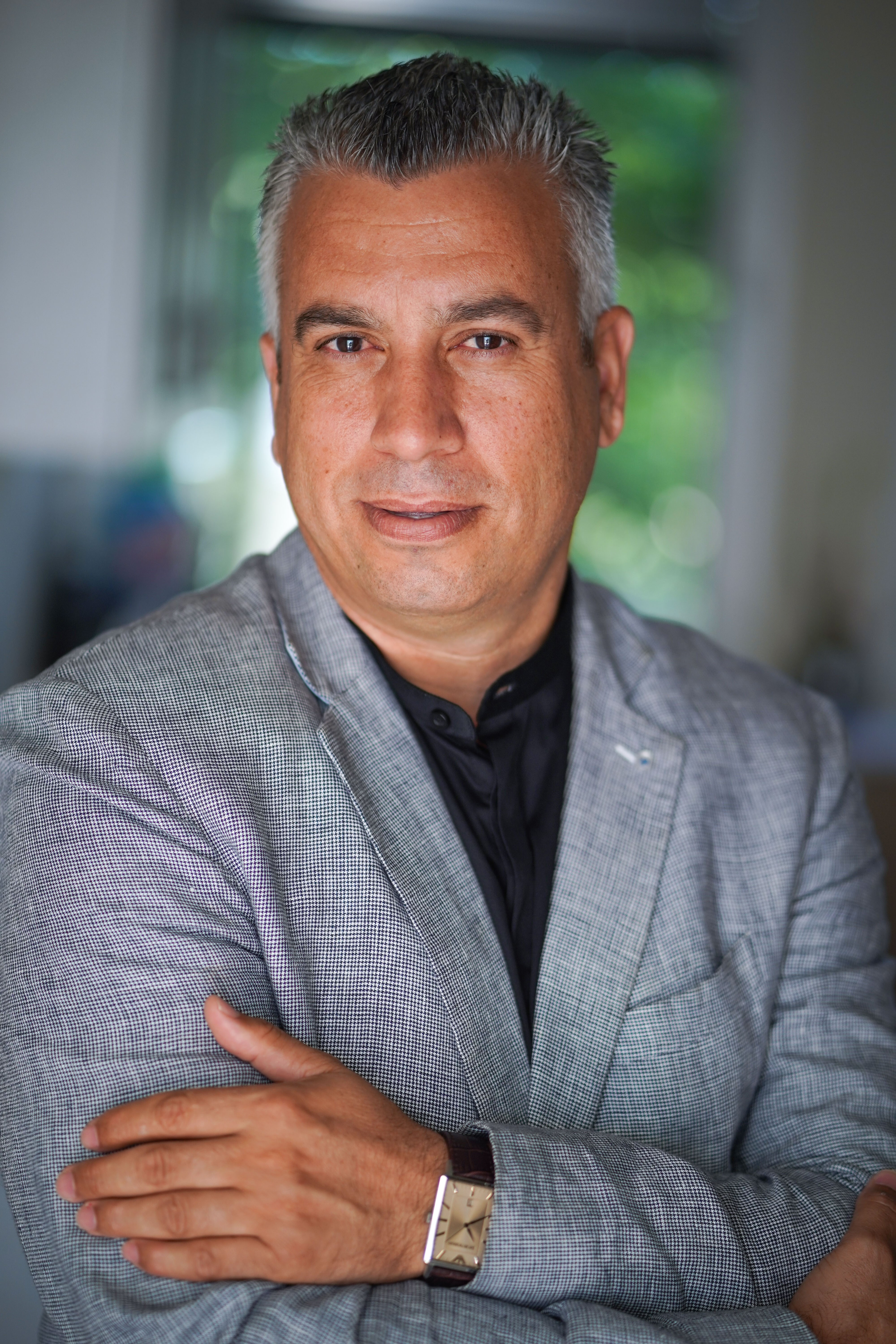
- Born: 29 June 1973 (age 53); Abu Snan, Israel
- Education: Ben-Gurion University of the Negev, Technion, Scripps Research
- Awards: Max Bergmann Medal (2026); Vincent du Vigneaud Award (2025); Leonidas Zervas Award (2024); ERC Advanced Grant (2019); Bessel Award (2015)
- Scientific career
- Fields: Chemical biology, Biochemistry, Organic chemistry
- Workplaces: Technion, Scripps Research, Ben-Gurion University of the Negev
- Doctoral advisors: Ehud Keinan, Philip E. Dawson
- Other academic advisors: Chi-Huey Wong

Ashraf Brik (Hebrew: אשרף בריק, Arabic: أشرف بريق; born 29 June 1973) is the Jordan and Irene Tark Academic Chair and a Full Professor at the Schulich Faculty of Chemistry at the Technion – Israel Institute of Technology. In 2024, he was elected a member of the Israel Academy of Sciences and Humanities. His laboratory specializes in developing innovative methodologies for the total chemical synthesis and semisynthesis of proteins, specifically those carrying post-translational modifications (PTMs), in quantities and with the homogeneity required for in-depth biochemical and functional studies. Brik's group develops novel modulators, including small molecules, peptides, and macrocyclic peptides, to target enzymes such as deubiquitinases (DUBs), ubiquitinated proteins, and other targets involved in human diseases.

== Early life and education ==
Brik, one of ten children, was born and raised in Abu Snan in northern Israel. He received his B.Sc. in Chemistry from Ben-Gurion University of the Negev in 1996. He then moved to the Technion – Israel Institute of Technology, where he earned his M.Sc. in 1998 under the supervision of Dr. Nizar Haddad. Brik completed his doctoral studies in 2001 through a joint program between the Technion and the Scripps Research Institute. His Ph.D. research, titled "Design and Synthesis of Novel Catalytic Proteins Based on Polypeptide Scaffolds", was supervised by Professor Ehud Keinan and Professor Philip E. Dawson.

Following his Ph.D., Brik conducted postdoctoral research at The Scripps Research Institute (2002–2006) under the mentorship of Professor Chi-Huey Wong, during which he was promoted to Senior Research Associate in 2004. During this period, he focused on the chemical synthesis of complex glycoproteins and was involved in projects to discover inhibitors of various enzymes, including HIV protease.

== Career ==
In 2007, Brik joined the Department of Chemistry at Ben-Gurion University of the Negev as a Senior Lecturer. He was promoted to Associate Professor in 2011 and to Full Professor in 2012. In March 2015, Brik moved to the Schulich Faculty of Chemistry at the Technion, where he holds the Jordan and Irene Tark Academic Chair. In 2024, in recognition of his scientific contributions, Brik was elected as a member of the Israel Academy of Sciences and Humanities.

Brik has authored more than 170 publications in leading scientific journals, including Science, Nature Chemistry, Nature Chemical Biology, Nature Protocols, Journal of the American Chemical Society, and Angewandte Chemie. He serves on the editorial and advisory boards of several periodicals, such as Angewandte Chemie (International Advisory Board), Cell Chemical Biology, and ChemBioChem. His research has also led to the registration of multiple patents in the fields of chemical protein synthesis and drug discovery.

The research efforts of Brik's group are supported by numerous national and international foundations, including the European Commission, which awarded him the ERC Advanced Grant in 2019 for the project "SynProAtCell" (Grant agreement ID: 831783).

== Research ==
The research in the Brik laboratory lies at the interface of organic chemistry and biology. Post-translational modifications (PTMs) of proteins affect their structure and function, making these processes crucial to human health. To overcome the challenges of obtaining homogeneously modified proteins, the Brik lab develops innovative chemical strategies, including transition-metal-mediated chemistry (such as palladium and gold complexes) to enable site-specific protein modification and assembly.

The Brik group is an international leader in the total chemical synthesis of ubiquitin-based conjugates. They have developed novel chemical methods to produce large quantities of highly homogeneous ubiquitin conjugates, including all eight types of di-ubiquitin chains and ubiquitinated proteins with chains of ubiquitin of various lengths and topologies. These tools have shed light on the mechanisms of ubiquitin signaling and enabled the discovery of novel modulators, including macrocyclic peptides, to regulate ubiquitin signaling in disease states.

Beyond ubiquitin, the group's research extends to epigenetics, synthesizing modified histones to decode the "histone code", and pioneering platforms for delivering synthetic proteins into live cells, such as Multiplexed Bead Loading (MBL), Suspension Bead Loading (SBL), and cell-penetrating peptides (CPPs).

== Honors and awards ==
- 2026: Max Bergmann Medal
- 2025: Vincent du Vigneaud Award, American Peptide Society
- 2024: Elected Member of the Israel Academy of Sciences and Humanities
- 2024: Leonidas Zervas Award, European Peptide Society
- 2019: ERC Advanced Grant, European Research Council
- 2019: The ICS Prize for the Outstanding Scientist, Israel Chemical Society
- 2018: Elected Member of the Young Israel Academy
- 2017: The Michael Bruno Memorial Award
- 2017: The Henry Taub Prize for Academic Excellence
- 2015: Friedrich Wilhelm Bessel Research Award, Alexander von Humboldt Foundation
- 2015: The 11th Hirata Award, Nagoya University
- 2013: Tetrahedron Young Investigator Award in Bioorganic and Medicinal Chemistry
- 2013: Teva Award for Excellence in Memory of Eli Hurvitz
- 2011: The ICS Prize for the Outstanding Young Chemist
