= Emilia Fridman =

Israeli professor of Electrical Engineering

- אמיליה פרידמן
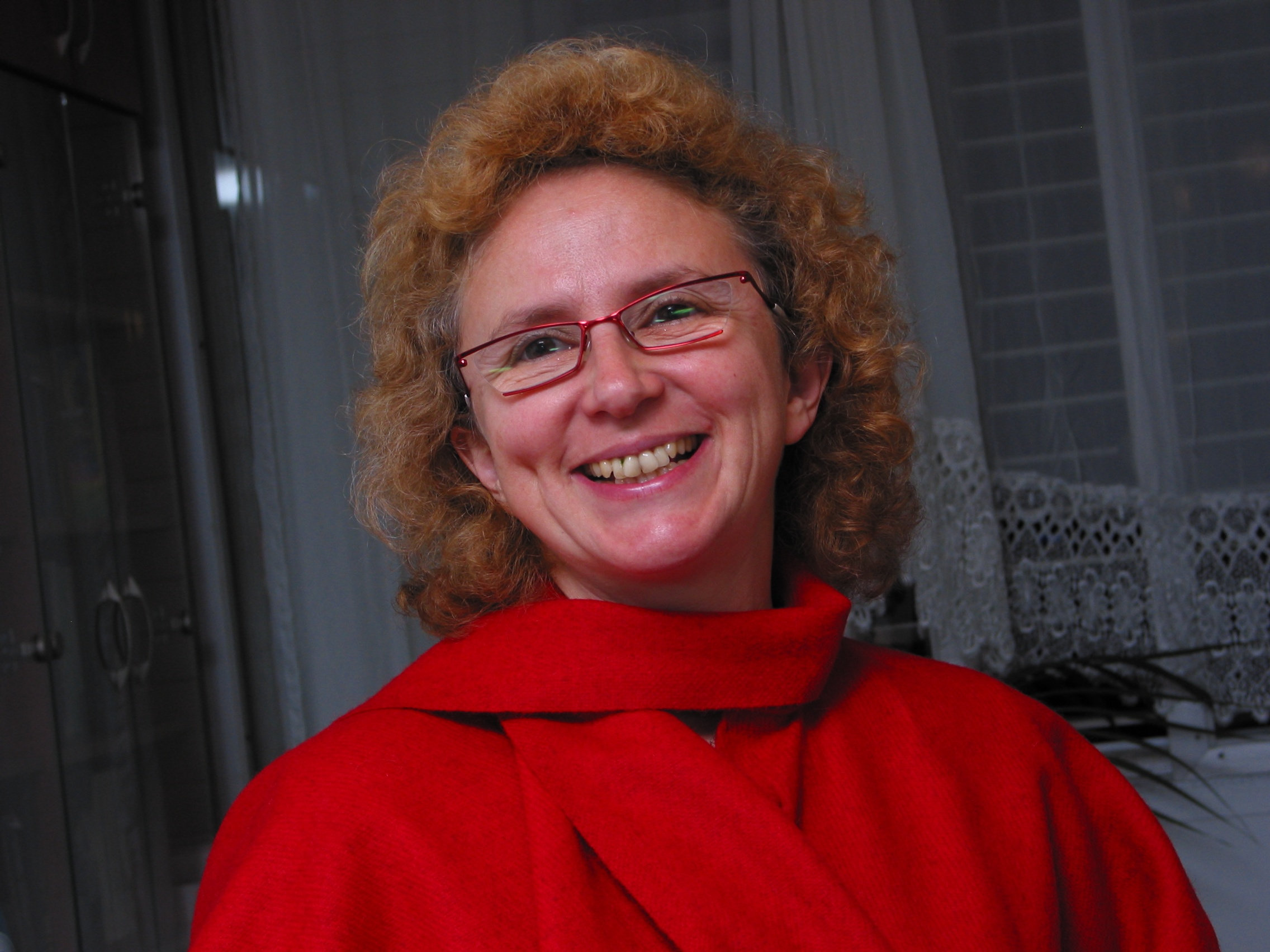
- Born: USSR
- Education: Kuibyshev State University; Voronezh State University
- Known for: Time-delay systems and sampled-data control
- Awards: IEEE fellow Highly Cited Researcher in 2014 by Thomson Reuters; IFAC Delay Systems Life Time Achievement Award
- Scientific career
- Fields: Control theory Applied mathematics Electrical engineering
- Workplaces: Tel Aviv University
- Thesis: Integral Manifolds of Singularly Perturbed Time-Delay Systems and Their Applications (1986)
- Doctoral advisor: Vadim Strygin

Emilia Fridman (Hebrew: אמיליה פרידמן, Russian: Фридман Эмилия Моисеевна) is an Israeli professor of Electrical Engineering in the Engineering Faculty at Tel Aviv University, specializing in control theory, time-delay and distributed parameter systems. She is an IEEE fellow for “contributions to time-delay systems and sampled-data control”.

== Early life and education ==
Emilia Fridman was born in Kuibyshev, USSR. During 1976-1981 she studied Mathematics, B.A. and M.Sc (with distinction) at Kuibyshev (Samara) State University. Her Ph.D. degree was received in 1986 in Mathematics from Voronezh State University (USSR). Fridman authored the thesis Integral Manifolds of Singularly Perturbed Time-Delay Systems and Their Applications, under the supervision of Vadim Strygin.

== Career ==
Fridman was a researcher at Kuibyshev Polytechnical Institute, USSR in the years 1981-1982. She joined Kuibyshev Institute of Railroad Engineers, Department of Mathematics, as Assistant Professor in 1985, and in 1989 was promoted to Associate Professor.

In 1992, Fridman moved with her family to Israel, and joined the Department of Electrical Engineering and Systems at Tel Aviv University. She worked on various programs supported by the Ministry of Absorption, starting from Senior Researcher in 1993, and becoming a Principal Research Associate (parallel to Associate Professor) in 2002. She was promoted to Full Professor in 2012.

Fridman has held visiting positions at Weierstrass Institute for Applied Analysis and Stochastics in Berlin (Germany), INRIA in Rocquencourt (France), Ecole Centrale de Lille (France), Valenciennes University (France), Leicester University (UK), Kent University (UK), CINVESTAV (Mexico), Zhejiang University (China), St. Petersburg ITMO (Russia), Melbourne University (Australia), Supelec (France), KTH (Sweden).

== Research work ==
Fridman’s research interests include time-delay and singularly perturbed systems, sampled-data and network-based control, control of partial differential equations (PDEs) and nonlinear control. She has pioneered a time-delay approach to sampled-data control. This approach became popular in networked control systems, allowing communication delays to be larger than the sampling intervals.

She has also introduced the descriptor method for time-delay systems and robust control that led to efficient analysis and design methods. Additionally she has introduced the Lyapunov-Krasovskii method for systems with fast-varying delays (without any constraints on the delay derivative). Fridman has pioneered the linear matrix inequalities approach to robust control of PDEs and network-based control of PDEs.

According to Google Scholar (August 2020) her h-index is 63 and she is the most highly cited woman in control theory.

== Professional experience ==
Fridman is a fellow of IEEE Control Systems Society. She is an Associate Editor of Automatica, and has been an Associate Editor in IMA J. Control & Information, SIAM J. Control & Optimization.

Fridman was nominated as Highly Cited Researcher in 2014 by Thomson Reuters (Web of Science).

In 2017 she was elected as a council of the International Federation of Automatic Control.

Since 2018, she is incumbent for Chana and Heinrich Manderman Chair on System Control at Tel Aviv University.

In 2021 she was awarded the IFAC Delay Systems Life Time Achievement Award and the Kadar Family Award.

== Publications ==
=== Books ===
- Fridman, Emilia (2014). Introduction to Time-Delay Systems: Analysis and Control. springer.
- Liu, Kun; Fridman, Emilia; Xia, Yuanqing. Networked Control Under Communication Constraints. Springer.

=== Selected articles ===
- Fridman E., "New Lyapunov-Krasovskii functionals for stability of linear retarded and neutral type systems," Systems & Control Letters, vol. 43, no. 4, 309–319, 2001.
- Fridman E. and Shaked U., "A descriptor system approach to H∞ control of linear time-delay systems," IEEE Trans. on Automatic control, vol. 47, no. 2, 253–270, 2002.
- Fridman E.,"Stability of Linear Descriptor Systems with Delay: A Lyapunov-Based Approach," Journal of Mathematical Analysis and Applications, vol. 273, no. 1, pp. 24–44, 2002.
- Fridman E. and Shaked U., "Delay-dependent stability and H∞ control: constant and time-varying delays," Int. J. Control, vol. 76, no. 1, 48–60, 2003.
- Fridman E., Seuret A. and Richard J.-P., "Robust sampled-data stabilization of linear systems: an input delay approach," Automatica, vol. 40, no. 8, 1441–1446, 2004.
- Fridman E., "A refined input delay approach to sampled-data control," Automatica, vol. 46, 421–427, 2010.
- Liu K. and Fridman E., "Wirtinger's Inequality and Lyapunov-Based Sampled-Data Stabilization," Automatica, vol. 48, 102–108, 2012.
- E. Fridman and A. Blighovsky. Robust Sampled-Data Control of a Class of Semilinear Parabolic Systems. Automatica, 48, 826-836, 2012.
- N. Bar Am. and E. Fridman Network-based Distributed $H_{\infty}$-Filtering of Parabolic Systems. Automatica, 50 (12), 3139–-3146, 2014.
- D. Freirich, E. Fridman Decentralized networked control of systems with local networks: a time-delay approach, Automatica, 69, 201-209, 2016.
- E. Fridman, L. Shaikhet. Stabilization by using artificial delays: an LMI approach. Automatica, 81, pp. 429–437, 2017.
- A. Selivanov, E. Fridman Delayed $H_\infty$ control of 2D diffusion systems under delayed pointlike measurements. Automatica, 109, 2019.

== Personal life ==
Fridman is married to Eugenii Shustin, a professor at the Mathematical Department of Tel Aviv University. They have a son, and live in Tel Aviv.
