= Thomas Loerting =

Austrian chemist

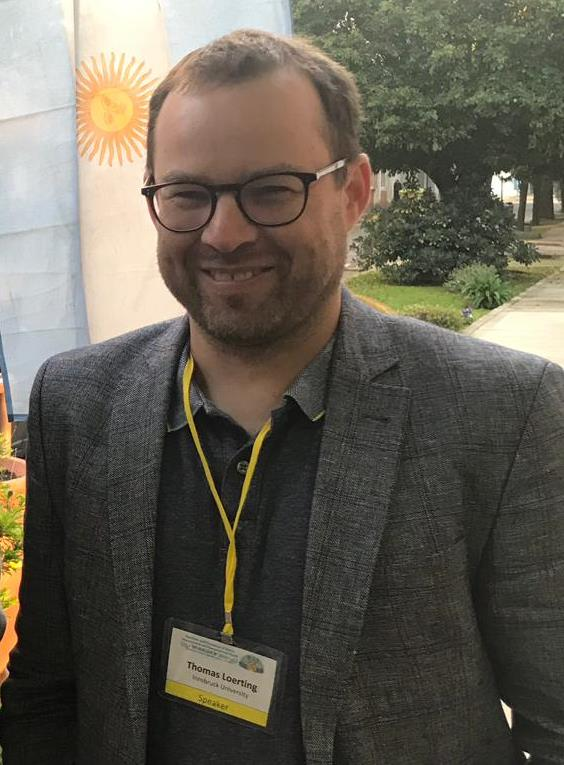
Thomas Loerting

Thomas Loerting (born October 29, 1973) is an Austrian chemist and associate professor at the University of Innsbruck. His research focuses on amorphous systems, the physics and chemistry of ice and chemistry at low temperatures.

== Biography ==
Thomas Loerting was born in Innsbruck where he also graduated from high-school ("Reithmanngymnasium") in 1992. He studied chemistry at the University of Innsbruck and received his Master's degree in 1997. In 1998, over the course of his Ph.D. in Innsbruck, Loerting was a guest lecturer at the Gadjah Mada University in Yogyakarta and the Chulalongkorn University in Bangkok, Thailand. He successfully defended his Ph.D. thesis titled "Kinetics of water mediated proton transfer in the atmosphere" in 2000. In 2001, he joined the team of Nobel laureate Mario Molina at the Massachusetts Institute of Technology. Loerting returned to Innsbruck in 2004 as assistant professor working together with Erwin Mayer. His habilitation "Disordered water at low temperatures" was submitted 2007. In 2008, he was elected as member of the Austrian Academy of Sciences ("Junge Kurie"). Since 2010, he is associate professor at the Institute of Physical Chemistry. As of 2012, he is also speaker of the research platform "Advanced Materials", which counts over 10 research groups. In addition to his academic work, he serves as advisor to the Austrian Luge Federation.

== Research ==
Thomas Loerting research includes more than 180 peer-reviewed international publications with more than 8000 citations, resulting in a h-index of 48 (as of October 2022). His first contributions were in the field of Theoretical and Computational chemistry, contributing to the understanding of hydration of sulfur dioxide and sulfur trioxide as well as the decomposition of chlorine nitrate, relevant to the chemistry of the atmosphere. He soon moved on to experiments where he advanced the field of amorphous ices, ice polymorphs and carbonic acid over the course of his career.

=== Amorphous ices ===
Thomas Loerting provided significant contributions for the understanding of polyamorphism in water. This includes the recognition of VHDA as third distinct amorphous state of water as well as extensive studies on structure and dynamics of low- and high-density amorphous ice (LDA and HDA) using dilatometry, spectroscopy, calorimetry and diffraction. One particularly notable finding was that LDA and HDA both exhibit glass-to-liquid transitions at ambient pressure, which provides support for the LLCP scenario in water.

=== Ice polymorphs ===
In addition to his achievements in the field of amorphous ices, Thomas Loerting is recognized for his works on crystalline ices, including the recent discovery of ice XIX. Together with his team he provided the first experimental proof that for each hydrogen-disordered ice phase (in this case: ice VI) several hydrogen-ordered counterparts (ices XV and XIX) may exist.

=== Cryochemistry ===
Another focus in the body of work of Thomas Loerting is acid-base chemistry under cryo-conditions. By employing the cryo-preparation and rapid quenching technique developed by Hage, Hallbrucker and Mayer, coupled with FTIR-spectroscopy of the solid and the matrix isolated species, Loerting and his co-workers have pioneered formation and isomerisation of carbonic acid and its derivatives.

== Awards and fellowships ==
Thomas Loerting has received numerous awards for his scientific input. Among the most notable are:

- 2000 Christine and Georg Sosnovsky price
- 2001 Schrödinger-Fellowship
- 2005 Nernst-Haber-Bodenstein Award
- 2006 Liechtenstein Award for Scientific Research
- 2006 Novartis Award
- 2007 Otto-Seibert Award
- 2008 European Research Council (ERC) Starting Grant
- 2012 Friedrich Wilhelm Bessel Research Award (Alexander von Humboldt Foundation)
- 2015 Top reviewer for The Journal of Chemical Physics
