= Zhao Jin (linguist) =

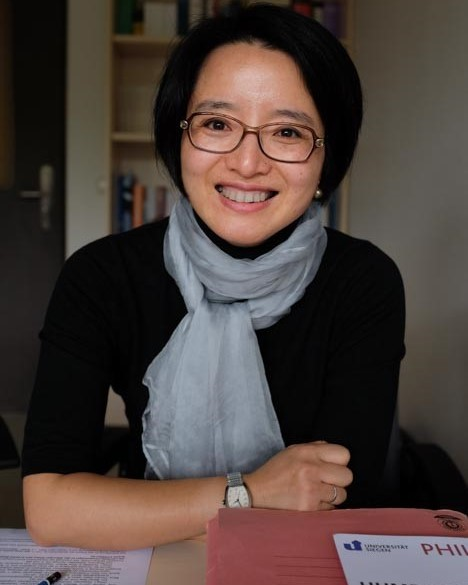
Zhao Jin

Zhao Jin (Chinese: 赵劲; born 22 November 1968) is a Chinese professor of German linguistics and a scholar in cultural-analytical linguistics.

== Education and career ==
Zhao Jin completed her undergraduate study in 1991 and her master's study in 1997 at the Tongji University. She subsequently received a DAAD-scholarship and was awarded a doctorate at the Philipps University of Marburg.

Zhao was Alexander von Humboldt Foundation Research Fellow (2005–2006), Diesterweg Research Fellow of the Research Institute of Humanities and Social Sciences (FIGS) in the University of Siegen (2012) and war awarded the title "Ten Outstanding Foreign Language Philologists in Shanghai (2014).

Zhao has been a full professor of German Linguistics since 2008 and the dean of department of German since 2013 at the Tongji University. She was a fellow at the Research College Morphomata of the University of Cologne (2017–2018). She is also a professor at the Technical University of Darmstadt from 2019 to 2020.

Zhao was awarded Friedrich Wilhelm Bessel Research Award by Alexander von Humboldt Foundation in 2011 and the research Award of Chinese Ministry of Education in 2013.

== Main research areas ==
Zhao has published widely in the fields of language for specific purposes, text linguistics, contrastive linguistics, cultural-analytical linguistics, German-Chinese intercultural communication, LSP didactics and methodology for German as a foreign language and language philosophy. She is a co-editor of the 13-volume proceedings of the XIII. International Germanist Congress Shanghai 2015 "German Language and Literature between Tradition and Innovation" and several other conference proceedings. She is also a co-editor of Peter Lang German Linguistics International series ISSN 1862-653X.

Zhao has been researching Wilhelm von Humboldt’s philosophy of language since 2016 and is currently leading the project of translating Humboldt’s work on language philosophy and linguistics into Chinese.

== Positions and memberships (selection) ==
- Chair of the Shanghai branch of the Association for the German Language (Gesellschaft für deutsche Sprache, GfdS)
- Member of the Scientific Advisory Board of the German Language Association (Verein Deutsche Sprache, VDS)
- Secretary General of the International Association of German Linguistics and Literature (IVG) (2010–2015)
- Committee member of the International Association of German Linguistics and Literature (IVG) (since 2015)
- Head of German language teaching group, National Foreign Languages Teaching Advisory Board, Chinese Ministry of Education (since 2018)

== Awards and honors (selection) ==
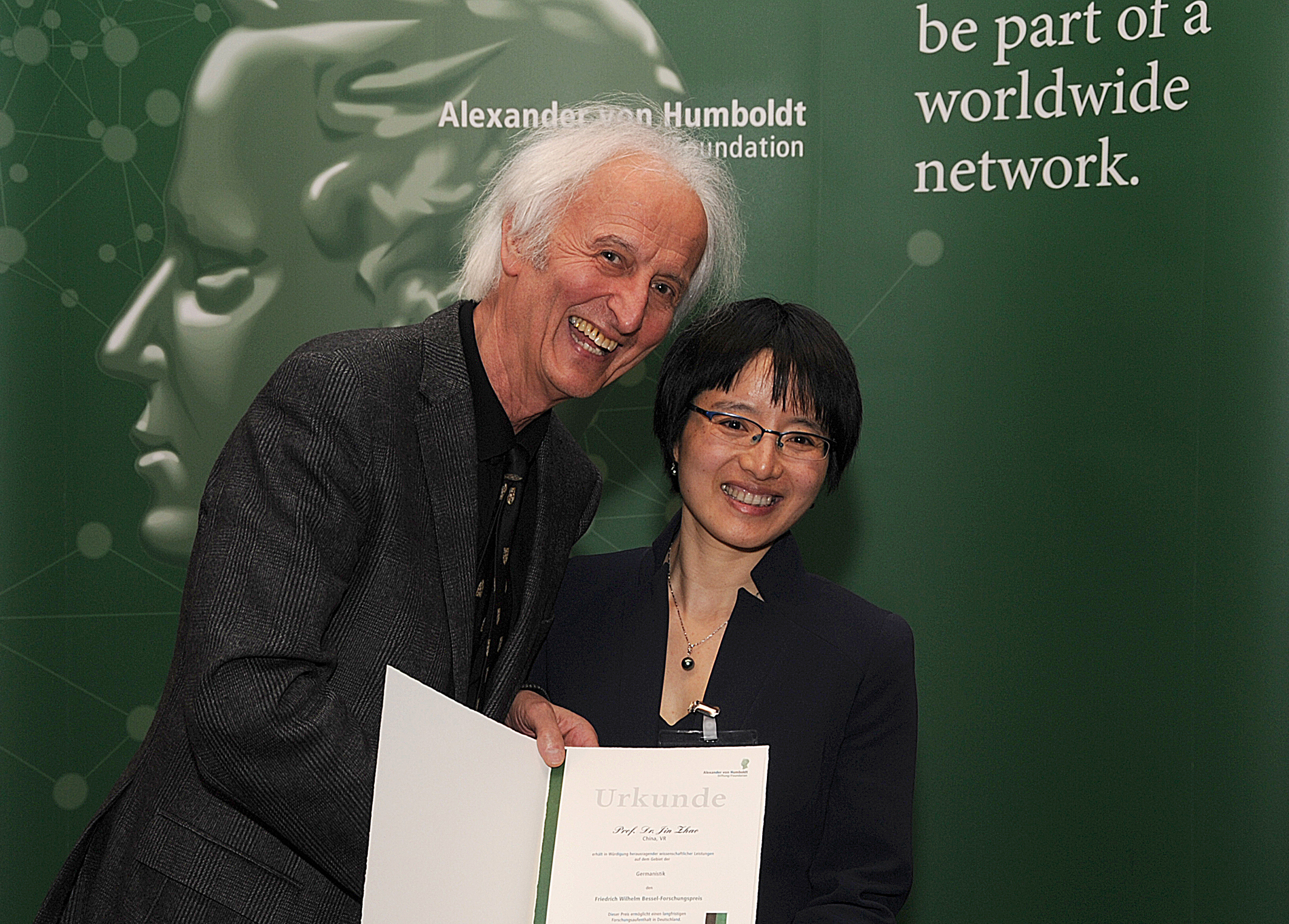
Friedrich Wilhelm Bessel Research Award of the Humboldt Foundation

- 2011: Friedrich Wilhelm Bessel Research Award of the Humboldt Foundation
- 2013: Research Award of the Chinese Ministry of Education

== Selected publications ==
=== Monographs ===
- Wirtschaftsdeutsch als Fremdsprache. Ein didaktisches Modell – dargestellt am Beispiel der chinesischen Germanistik-Studiengänge, (Dissertation) Narr Verlag, Thübingen, 2002, ISBN 978-3-8233-5364-5
- Interkulturalität von Textsortenkonventionen. Vergleich deutscher und chinesischer Kulturstile, Frank & Timme Verlag, Berlin, 2008, ISBN 978-3-86596-169-3
- Wissenschaftsdiskurse kontrastiv. Kulturalität als Textualitätsmerkmal im deutsch-chinesischen Vergleich, De Gruyter, 2018, ISBN 9783110587746

=== Articles ===
- Kontrastive Analyse Mandarin-Deutsch. In: Hans-Jürgen Krumm, Christian Fandrych, Britta Hufeisen, Claudia Riemer: Deutsch als Fremd- und Zweitsprache. Ein internationales Handbuch (= Handbücher zur Sprach- und Kommunikationswissenschaft), S. 627–634, Mouton de Gruyter, Berlin/New York, 2010
- Das deutsche Chinabild in der Wirtschaft. Journalistische China-Artikel in gehobenen Printmedien. In: Klaus-Dienter Baumann (Hrsg.): Fach – Translat – Kultur. Interdisziplinäre Aspekte der vernetzten Vielfalt. (= Forum für Fachsprachen-Forschung, Bd. 99), S. 1301–1329, Frank & Timme, Berlin, 2011
- Kulturspezifik, Inter- und Transkulturalität von Textsorten. In: Stephan Habscheid (Hrsg.): Textsorten, Handlungsmuster, Oberflächen. Linguistische Typologien der Kommunikation S. 123–143, de Gruyter, Berlin, New York, 2011
- Wandel der Textsorte, Wandel der Kultur. Kontrastive Analyse und diachronischer Vergleich deutscher und chinesischer wissenschaftliche Rezensionen. In: LiLi Zeitschrift für Literaturwissenschaft und Linguistik, Heft 169, S. 144–164, 2013
- Germanistik zwischen Tradition und Innovation. In: LiLi Zeitschrift für Literaturwissenschaft und Linguistik, Heft 172, 2013, S. 145–150
- Die Wechselwirkung des Selbstbildes und des Fremdbildes. Analyse von Medienberichten zu Sino-Afrika-Beziehungen. In: Friedemann Vogel, Jia Wenjian (Hrsg.) 2017: Chinesisch-Deutscher Imagereport: das Bild Chinas im deutschsprachigen Raum aus kultur-, medien- und sprachwissenschaftlicher Perspektive (2000–2013), S. 139–153, De Gruyter, Berlin, 2017
- Wilhelm von Humboldt in China: Rezeptionen, Forschungen und Probleme. In: LiLi Zeitschrift für Literaturwissenschaft und Linguistik, 4/2018, S. 759–774, 2018
