= Martha W. Alibali =

American psychologist

Martha W. Alibali is a Vilas Distinguished Achievement Professor of Psychology and Educational Psychology at the University of Wisconsin–Madison, and an investigator at the Wisconsin Center for Education Research.

She is a cognitive and developmental psychologist who studies children's knowledge and communication about mathematical concepts. Her research focuses on mechanisms of knowledge change in cognitive development and learning. In particular, she investigates the change processes that take place when children learn new concepts and problem-solving strategies, and when they express and communicate their knowledge in gestures and in speech. Her current research projects examine the function of spontaneous gestures in thinking and speaking, the transition from arithmetic to algebraic reasoning, and the role of diagrams in mathematical and scientific reasoning. Her work is currently funded by the National Science Foundation, and she has previously received funding from the U.S. Department of Education, the National Institutes of Health, the James S. McDonnell Foundation, the Spencer Foundation, and the Interagency Educational Research Initiative. She earned her Ph.D. in Psychology at the University of Chicago.

== Awards ==
- Friedrich Wilhelm Bessel Research Award, Alexander von Humboldt Foundation, 2013
- Fellow of the American Psychological Society, 2005
- American Psychological Foundation, Robert L. Fantz Memorial Award, 2004, for young investigator in perceptual or cognitive development
- Chancellor's Distinguished Teaching Award, University of Wisconsin–Madison, 2004
- Award for Excellence in Teaching, Department of Psychology, University of Wisconsin–Madison, 2001–2002

== Books ==
- Norton, A. & Alibali, M. W. (Eds.). (2019). Constructing number: Merging perspectives from psychology and mathematics education. Springer (Research in Mathematics Education series).
- Church, R. B., Alibali, M. W. & Kelly, S. D. (Eds.). (2017). Why gesture? How the hands function in speaking, thinking, and communicating. Amsterdam: John Benjamins.
- Siegler, R. S. & Alibali, M. W. (2005). Children's thinking (4th ed.). Upper Saddle River, NJ: Prentice Hall.
