= Lorenzo Perilli =

Italian classicist and academic

Lorenzo Perilli is an Italian classicist and academic at the University of Rome Tor Vergata. A Professor of Classical Philology, he is Head of the Institute of Literature, Philosophy and Art history, and the Director of the interdisciplinary Research Centre in Classics, Mathematics and Philosophy Forms of Knowledge in the Ancient World, established in 2013 and devoted to ancient science and related disciplines. He is Co-director of the periodicals Technai. An international journal on ancient science and technology, and Science and Technology for cultural heritage. He also serves on the directors’ board of the journal of ancient medicine Galenos.

He was educated in Classics at the University of Rome Tor Vergata (1983–1989), where he also received his PhD in Philosophy. He was awarded several international research grants and prizes, among them a 2-year grant from the Alexander von Humboldt Foundation (LMU Munich, Germany, 1996), and the Prize of the Italian Ministry of Cultural Heritage in 2001 for his studies on ancient philosophy and science. In 2007, he won the Friedrich Wilhelm Bessel International Research Award in Germany, following a nomination by the Corpus Medicorum Graecorum of the Berlin-Brandenburg Academy of Sciences, where he subsequently conducted his research for about one year. In August 2006 he was research associate at the Wellcome Trust Centre for the History of Medicine at University College London, in 2010 a visiting scholar of the Fonds National Suisse de la Recherche Scientifique at the University of Zurich, in 2013 Petra Kappert Fellow at the University of Hamburg, Centre for the Study of Manuscript Cultures, in 2014 a fellow of the Berliner Antike Kolleg, Berlin, in 2017 and 2021 Visiting Professor at Venice International University. In 2019, his critical edition of Galen's Hippocratic Glossary published for the Berlin Academy of Sciences (CMG) was awarded the Mario Di Nola Prize by the Accademia Nazionale dei Lincei. His work on ancient empiricism has attracted the attention of the mathematician and essayist Nassim N. Taleb at the time when he was writing his best-selling book The Black Swan. His book of 2025 Coscienza Artificiale. Come le macchine pensano e trasformano l’esperienza umana (Artificial consciousness. How machines think and transform human experience) has enjoyed a remarkable success and raised some interest. He also works as a translator from German, English, French, Dutch.

== Academic Interests ==
Perilli's main fields of research include Ancient Greek medicine (Temple medicine, Hippocrates, Galen, empiricism), the history of ideas, Ancient Greek philosophy and science, textual criticism and classical philology. He is also recognised as an expert in humanities computing and in the impact of algorithmic machines and artificial intelligence on human activities and the human mind.

== Publications ==
Perilli's main publications include among others

- Filologia computazionale, Rome, Accademia Nazionale dei Lincei 1995
- La teoria del vortice nel pensiero antico, Pisa, Pacini 1996
- Menodoto di Nicomedia. Contributo a una storia galeniana della medicina empirica, München-Leipzig, Saur 2004
- La filosofia antica. Itinerario storico e testuale (with D.P. Taormina), Turin, Utet 2012
- Logos. Theorie und Begriffsgeschichte, Darmstadt, Wissenschaftliche Buchgesellschaft, 2013
- Italian edition of R.B. Onians, The origins of European thought, Cambridge 1954 (Milan, Adelphi, 2nd ed., 1998)
- Italian edition and translation of G.E.R. Lloyd and N. Sivin, The Way and the Word. Science and Medicine in Ancient China and Greece, Yale UP 2002 (Tao e Logos. Scienza e medicina nell'antichità: Cina e Grecia, Pisa, Edizioni della Normale, 2009)
- Italian translation (from Dutch), with introduction, of L.E.J. Brouwer, Leven Kunst en Mystiek, Delft 1905 (Vita, arte e mistica, Milan, Adelphi, 2015)
- (with Luca Canali) I tre volti di Catullo, Milan, Rizzoli 2013
- (with Luca Canali) Il rivoluzionario conseguente. Cesare, Augusto, e il secolo estremo della storia di Roma, Rome, Castelvecchi 2015
- Vocum Hippocratis Glossarium (Galen's Hippocratic Glossary), Berlin, Walter De Gruyter 2017 (Corpus Medicorum Graecorum V 13,1)
- Ancient Philosophy. Textual paths and historical explorations (ed., with D.P. Taormina), London and New York, Routledge 2017
- Coscienza artificiale. Come le macchine pensano e trasformano l’esperienza umana, Milano, Il Saggiatore, 2025

He contributed many articles to scholarly journals and conference proceedings.
