= Martin Albrecht (chemist) =

Swiss chemist (born 1971)

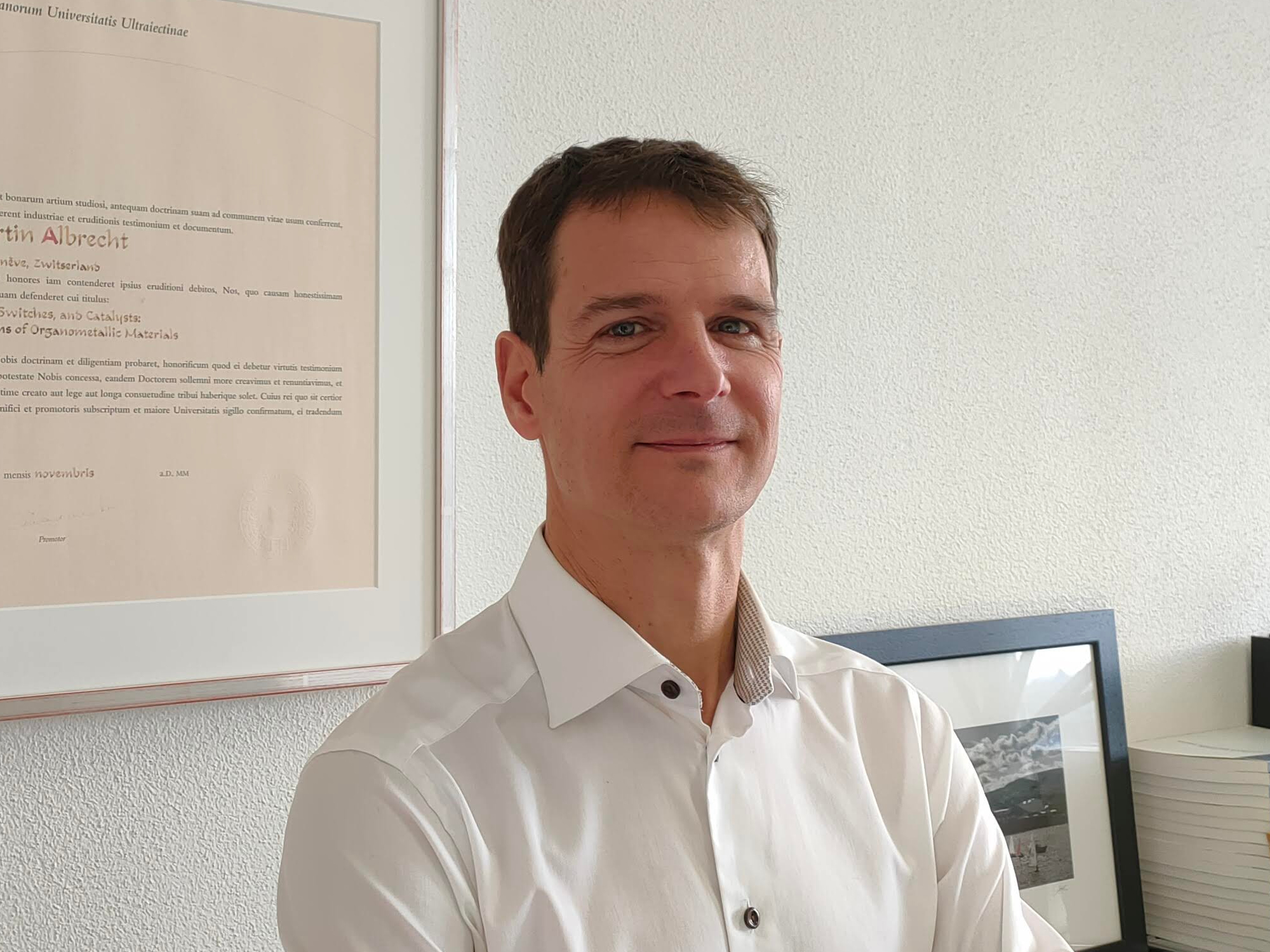
- Prof. Dr. Martin Albrecht
- Born: December 12, 1971 (age 54)
- Education: Bern University (MA); Utrecht University (PhD, Summa Cum Laude)
- Scientific career
- Fields: Organometallic Chemistry
- Institutions: Bern University; University College Dublin; Fribourg University; Yale University; Utrecht University
- Thesis: Sensors, Switches, and Catalysts: New applications of Organometallic Materials (2000)
- Doctoral advisor: Prof. Dr. Gerard van Koten, Utrecht University, The Netherlands
- Website: albrechtresearch.com

Martin Albrecht (born December 12, 1971) is a Swiss chemist. He is Professor of Inorganic Chemistry at the Department of Chemistry, Biochemistry and Pharmacy at the University of Bern. He is known for his contribution to carbene chemistry, particularly with his work on 1,2,3-triazolylidene mesoionic carbene.

== Education ==
Martin Albrecht completed his undergraduate education at the University of Bern from 1991 to 1996. His early research career started in 1996 during his PhD studies under the supervision of Prof. Dr. Gerard van Koten at Utrecht University, in The Netherlands. He studied the formation and properties of novel inorganic materials using the privileged pincer ligand platform which led, for example, to discoveries such as organoplatinium complexes that appeared applicable as very sensitive SO_{2} sensors. In 2001, Martin Albrecht was awarded the Backer price from the Royal Dutch Chemical Society in recognition of his PhD thesis work.

The first triazolylidene iridium complex reported by Martin Albrecht et al. in Journal of the American Chemical Society 2008, 130, 13534–13535.

== Career and Research ==
After his PhD, he joined Robert H. Crabtree's research team at Yale in 2001 to develop the coordination chemistry of N-heterocyclic carbene ligands with various metals and to study their application as catalysts in C–H activation reactions.

This period was followed by a short stay, 2002–2003, as researcher R&D Coating Effects, in Ciba Specialty Chemicals (Basel, CH). Then, Martin Albrecht accepted a position as Alfred Werner assistant professorship in Fribourg, Switzerland working on N-heterocyclic carbene coordination chemistry, on the edge with biology. For this research, he was granted a European Research Council starting grant in 2005 for the CARBENZYMES project that aimed to understand the bonding properties of metalloenzymes.

In 2009, he joined the University College Dublin as a full Professor. He developed a productive research program using novel 1,2,3-triazolylidene mesoionic carbene ligands. At that time, he received a European Research Council Consolidator Grant in 2014 for the synMICs project that aimed at the exploration of sustainable pathways for the efficient production of pharmaceutical drugs and for energy storage with 3d metals.

In 2015, he moved with his research group back to Bern, Switzerland to continue his research on donor flexible ligands as Professor of Inorganic Chemistry. Since 2021, he has been deputy director of the Department of Chemistry, Biochemistry and Pharmaceutical Sciences, University of Bern. In 2021, the 1st year Biology Bachelor students recognized his commitment to teach young undergraduate students, to inspire them and to act as a scientific role model by nominating him for the "Teacher of the year 2021" award.

== Major grants and Awards ==
- 2016 GIAN fellow (Indian Ministry of Human Resource Development)
- 2015 Catalysis Society of South Africa (CATSA eminent visitor)
- 2014 European Research Council Consolidator Grant
- 2013 Bessel Award (Humboldt Foundation)
- 2011 Fellow of the Royal Society of Chemistry
- 2008 Visiting Professor (University of Otago, New Zealand)
- 2007 European Research Council Starting Grant
- 2002 Alfred Werner Assistant Professorship (Alfred Werner Foundation)
- 2001 Bakker price from the Royal Dutch Chemical Society
