= Alon–Boppana bound =

Second-largest eigenvalue lower bound

In spectral graph theory, the Alon–Boppana bound provides a lower bound on the second-largest eigenvalue of the adjacency matrix of a $d$-regular graph, meaning a graph in which every vertex has degree $d$. The reason for the interest in the second-largest eigenvalue is that the largest eigenvalue is guaranteed to be $d$ due to $d$-regularity, with the all-ones vector being the associated eigenvector. The graphs that come close to meeting this bound are Ramanujan graphs, which are examples of the best possible expander graphs.

Its discoverers are Noga Alon and Ravi Boppana.

== Theorem statement ==
Let $G$ be a $d$-regular graph on $n$ vertices with diameter $m$, and let $A$ be its adjacency matrix. Let $\lambda_1 \ge \lambda_2 \ge \cdots \ge \lambda_n$ be its eigenvalues. Then

$$\lambda_2 \ge 2\sqrt{d-1} - \frac{2\sqrt{d-1} - 1}{\lfloor m/2 \rfloor}.$$

The above statement is the original one proved by Noga Alon. Some slightly weaker variants exist to improve the ease of proof or improve intuition. Two of these are shown in the proofs below.

== Intuition ==
The Cayley graph of the free group on two generators $a$ and $b$ is an example of an infinite $d$-regular tree for $d=4.$

The intuition for the number $2\sqrt{d-1}$ comes from considering the infinite $d$-regular tree. This graph is a universal cover of $d$-regular graphs, and it has spectral radius $2\sqrt{d-1}.$

== Saturation ==
A graph that essentially saturates the Alon–Boppana bound is called a Ramanujan graph. More precisely, a Ramanujan graph is a $d$-regular graph such that $|\lambda_2|, |\lambda_n| \le 2\sqrt{d-1}.$

A theorem by Friedman shows that, for every $d$ and $\epsilon > 0$ and for sufficiently large $n$, a random $d$-regular graph $G$ on $n$ vertices satisfies $\max\{|\lambda_2|, |\lambda_n|\} < 2\sqrt{d-1} + \epsilon$ with high probability. This means that a random $n$-vertex $d$-regular graph is typically "almost Ramanujan."

== First proof (slightly weaker statement) ==
We will prove a slightly weaker statement, namely dropping the specificity on the second term and simply asserting $\lambda_2 \ge 2\sqrt{d-1} - o(1).$ Here, the $o(1)$ term refers to the asymptotic behavior as $n$ grows without bound while $d$ remains fixed.

Let the vertex set be $V.$ By the min-max theorem, it suffices to construct a nonzero vector $z\in\mathbb{R}^{|V|}$ such that $z^{\text{T}}\mathbf{1} = 0$ and $\frac{z^{\text{T}}Az}{z^{\text{T}}z} \ge 2\sqrt{d-1} - o(1).$

Pick some value $r\in\mathbb{N}.$ For each vertex in $V,$ define a vector $f(v)\in\mathbb{R}^{|V|}$ as follows. Each component will be indexed by a vertex $u$ in the graph. For each $u,$ if the distance between $u$ and $v$ is $k,$ then the $u$-component of $f(v)$ is $f(v)_u = w_k = (d-1)^{-k/2}$ if $k\le r-1$ and $0$ if $k\ge r.$ We claim that any such vector $x = f(v)$ satisfies

$$\frac{x^{\text{T}}Ax}{x^{\text{T}}x} \ge 2\sqrt{d-1}\left(1 - \frac{1}{2r}\right).$$

To prove this, let $V_k$ denote the set of all vertices that have a distance of exactly $k$ from $v.$ First, note that

$$x^{\text{T}}x = \sum_{k=0}^{r-1}|V_k|w^2_k.$$

Second, note that

$$x^{\text{T}}Ax = \sum_{u\in V}x_u \sum_{u'\in N(u)}x_{u'} \ge \sum_{k=0}^{r-1}|V_k|w_k\left[w_{k-1} + (d-1)w_{k+1}\right] - (d-1)|V_{r-1}|w_{r-1}w_r,$$

where the last term on the right comes from a possible overcounting of terms in the initial expression. The above then implies

$$x^{\text{T}}Ax \ge 2\sqrt{d-1}\left(\sum_{k=0}^{r-1}|V_k|w^2_k - \frac{1}{2}|V_{r-1}|w^2_{r-1}\right),$$

which, when combined with the fact that $|V_{k+1}| \le (d-1)|V_k|$ for any $k,$ yields

$$x^{\text{T}}Ax \ge 2\sqrt{d-1}\left(1 - \frac{1}{2r}\right)\sum_{k=0}^{r-1}|V_k|w^2_k.$$

The combination of the above results proves the desired inequality.

For convenience, define the $(r-1)$-ball of a vertex $v$ to be the set of vertices with a distance of at most $r-1$ from $v.$ Notice that the entry of $f(v)$ corresponding to a vertex $u$ is nonzero if and only if $u$ lies in the $(r-1)$-ball of $x.$

The number of vertices within distance $k$ of a given vertex is at most $1 + d + d(d-1) + d(d-1)^2 + \cdots + d(d-1)^{k-1} = d^k + 1.$ Therefore, if $n \ge d^{2r-1} + 2,$ then there exist vertices $u, v$ with distance at least $2r.$

Let $x = f(v)$ and $y = f(u).$ It then follows that $x^{\text{T}}y = 0,$ because there is no vertex that lies in the $(r-1)$-balls of both $x$ and $y.$ It is also true that $x^{\text{T}}Ay = 0,$ because no vertex in the $(r-1)$-ball of $x$ can be adjacent to a vertex in the $(r-1)$-ball of $y.$

Now, there exists some constant $c$ such that $z = x - cy$ satisfies $z^{\text{T}}\mathbf{1} = 0.$ Then, since $x^{\text{T}}y = x^{\text{T}}Ay = 0,$

$$z^{\text{T}}Az = x^{\text{T}}Ax + c^2y^{\text{T}}Ay \ge 2\sqrt{d-1}\left(1 - \frac{1}{2r}\right)(x^{\text{T}}x + c^2y^{\text{T}}y) = 2\sqrt{d-1}\left(1 - \frac{1}{2r}\right)z^{\text{T}}z.$$

Finally, letting $r$ grow without bound while ensuring that $n \ge d^{2r-1} + 2$ (this can be done by letting $r$ grow sublogarithmically as a function of $n$) makes the error term $o(1)$ in $n.$

== Second proof (slightly modified statement) ==
This proof will demonstrate a slightly modified result, but it provides better intuition for the source of the number $2\sqrt{d-1}.$ Rather than showing that $\lambda_2 \ge 2\sqrt{d-1} - o(1),$ we will show that $\lambda = \max(|\lambda_2|, |\lambda_n|) \ge 2\sqrt{d-1} - o(1).$

First, pick some value $k\in\mathbb{N}.$ Notice that the number of closed walks of length $2k$ is

$$\operatorname{tr}A^{2k} = \sum_{i=1}^n \lambda^{2k}_i\le d^{2k} + n\lambda^{2k}.$$

However, it is also true that the number of closed walks of length $2k$ starting at a fixed vertex $v$ in a $d$-regular graph is at least the number of such walks in an infinite $d$-regular tree, because an infinite $d$-regular tree can be used to cover the graph. By the definition of the Catalan numbers, this number is at least $C_k(d-1)^k,$ where $C_k = \frac{1}{k+1}\binom{2k}{k}$ is the $k^{\text{th}}$ Catalan number.

It follows that

$$\operatorname{tr}A^{2k} \ge n\frac{1}{k+1}\binom{2k}{k}(d-1)^{k}$$
$$\implies \lambda^{2k} \ge \frac{1}{k+1}\binom{2k}{k}(d-1)^{k} - \frac{d^{2k}}{n}.$$

Letting $n$ grow without bound and letting $k$ grow without bound but sublogarithmically in $n$ yields $\lambda \ge 2\sqrt{d-1} - o(1).$
