= Boundary (graph theory) =

Graph nodes linked to, but not part of, a subgraph

In graph theory, the outer boundary of a subset S of the vertices of a graph G is the set of vertices in G that are adjacent to vertices in S, but not in S themselves. The inner boundary is the set of vertices in S that have a neighbor outside S. The edge boundary is the set of edges with one endpoint in the inner boundary and one endpoint in the outer boundary.

These boundaries and their sizes are particularly relevant for isoperimetric problems in graphs, separator theorems, minimum cuts, expander graphs, and percolation theory.
