= Superstrong =

In mathematics, superstrong may refer to:

- Superstrong cardinal in set theory
- Superstrong approximation in algebraic group theory
