= Resistance distance =

Graph metric of electrical resistance between nodes

In graph theory, the resistance distance between two vertices of a simple, connected graph, G, is equal to the resistance between two equivalent points on an electrical network, constructed so as to correspond to G, with each edge being replaced by a resistance of one ohm. It is a metric on graphs.

== Definition ==
On a graph G, the resistance distance Ω_{i,j} between two vertices v_{i} and v_{j} is

$$\Omega_{i,j}:=\Gamma_{i,i}+\Gamma_{j,j}-\Gamma_{i,j}-\Gamma_{j,i},$$
where $\Gamma = \left(L + \frac{1}{|V|}\Phi\right)^+,$

with ^{+} denotes the Moore–Penrose inverse, L the Laplacian matrix of G, |V| is the number of vertices in G, and Φ is the |V| × |V| matrix containing all 1s.

== Properties of resistance distance ==
If i = j then Ω_{i,j} = 0. For an undirected graph

$$\Omega_{i,j}=\Omega_{j,i}=\Gamma_{i,i}+\Gamma_{j,j}-2\Gamma_{i,j}$$

=== General sum rule ===
For any N-vertex simple connected graph G = (V, E) and arbitrary N×N matrix M:

$$\sum_{i,j \in V}(LML)_{i,j}\Omega_{i,j} = -2\operatorname{tr}(ML)$$

From this generalized sum rule a number of relationships can be derived depending on the choice of M. Two of note are;

$$\begin{align}
\sum_{(i,j) \in E}\Omega_{i,j} &= N - 1 \\
\sum_{i<j \in V}\Omega_{i,j} &= N\sum_{k=1}^{N-1} \lambda_k^{-1}
\end{align}$$

where the λ_{k} are the non-zero eigenvalues of the Laplacian matrix. This unordered sum

$$\sum_{i<j} \Omega_{i,j}$$

is called the Kirchhoff index of the graph.

=== Relationship to the number of spanning trees of a graph ===
For a simple connected graph G = (V, E), the resistance distance between two vertices may be expressed as a function of the set of spanning trees, T, of G as follows:

$$\Omega_{i,j}=\begin{cases}
\frac{\left | \{t:t \in T,\, e_{i,j} \in t\} \right \vert}{\left |  T \right \vert},  & (i,j) \in E\\ \frac{\left | T'-T \right \vert}{\left |  T \right \vert},  &(i,j) \not \in E
\end{cases}$$

where T' is the set of spanning trees for the graph G' = (V, E + e_{i,j}). In other words, for an edge $(i,j)\in E$, the resistance distance between a pair of nodes $i$ and $j$ is the probability that the edge $(i,j)$ is in a random spanning tree of $G$.

=== Relationship to random walks ===
The resistance distance between vertices $u$ and $v$ is proportional to the commute time $C_{u,v}$ of a random walk between $u$ and $v$. The commute time is the expected number of steps in a random walk that starts at $u$, visits $v$, and returns to $u$. For a graph with $m$ edges, the resistance distance and commute time are related as $C_{u,v}=2m\Omega_{u,v}$.

Resistance distance is also related to the escape probability between two vertices. The escape probability $P_{u,v}$ between $u$ and $v$ is the probability that a random walk starting at $u$ visits $v$ before returning to $u$. The escape probability equals

$$P_{u,v} = \frac{1}{\deg(u)\Omega_{u,v}},$$

where $\deg(u)$ is the degree of $u$. Unlike the commute time, the escape probability is not symmetric in general, i.e., $P_{u,v}\neq P_{v,u}$.

=== As a squared Euclidean distance ===
Since the Laplacian L is symmetric and positive semi-definite, so is

$$\left(L+\frac{1}{|V|}\Phi\right),$$

thus its pseudo-inverse Γ is also symmetric and positive semi-definite. Thus, there is a K such that $\Gamma = KK^\textsf{T}$ and we can write:

$$\Omega_{i,j} = \Gamma_{i,i} + \Gamma_{j,j} - \Gamma_{i,j} - \Gamma_{j,i} = K_iK_i^\textsf{T} + K_j K_j^\textsf{T} - K_i K_j^\textsf{T} - K_j K_i^\textsf{T} = \left(K_i - K_j\right)^2$$

showing that the square root of the resistance distance corresponds to the Euclidean distance in the space spanned by K.

=== Connection with Fibonacci numbers ===
A fan graph is a graph on n + 1 vertices where there is an edge between vertex i and n + 1 for all i = 1, 2, 3, …, n, and there is an edge between vertex i and i + 1 for all i = 1, 2, 3, …, n – 1.

The resistance distance between vertex n + 1 and vertex i ∈ {1, 2, 3, …, n} is

$$\frac{ F_{2(n-i)+1} F_{2i-1} }{ F_{2n} }$$

where F_{j} is the j-th Fibonacci number, for j ≥ 0.

== See also ==
- Conductance (graph)
