= Weak approximation =

Weak approximation may refer to:

- Weak approximation theorem, an extension of the Chinese remainder theorem to algebraic groups over global fields
- Weak weak approximation, a form of weak approximation for varieties
- Weak-field approximation, a solution in general relativity
