= Cheeger constant (graph theory) =

Measure of whether or not a graph has a "bottleneck"

Here, a subset A of the graph G (denoted red) has 3 vertices, and 3 edges leaving its subset (denoted green and dashed). The number of edges leaving the subset divided by the size of the subset is denoted $| \partial A |/| A |$, which here is $3/3 = 1$. The Cheeger constant is the minimum $| \partial A |/| A |$ of all subsets of the graph G which are not empty and whose size is less than or equal to half the size of G. For this graph G, this subset A has the smallest value $| \partial A |/| A |$, and therefore 1 is the Cheeger constant of G

In mathematics, the Cheeger constant (also Cheeger number or isoperimetric number) of a graph is a numerical measure of whether or not a graph has a "bottleneck". The Cheeger constant as a measure of "bottleneckedness" is of great interest in many areas: for example, constructing well-connected networks of computers, card shuffling. The graph theoretical notion originated after the Cheeger isoperimetric constant of a compact Riemannian manifold.

The Cheeger constant is named after Jeff Cheeger.

== Definition ==
Let G be an undirected finite graph with vertex set V(G) and edge set E(G). For a collection of vertices A ⊆ V(G), let ∂A denote the collection of all edges going from a vertex in A to a vertex outside of A (sometimes called the edge boundary of A):

$$\partial A := \{ \{x, y\} \in E(G) \ : \ x \in A, y \in V(G) \setminus A \}.$$

Note that the edges are unordered, i.e., $\{x, y\} = \{y, x\}$. The Cheeger constant of G, denoted h(G), is defined by

$$h(G) := \min \left\{\frac{| \partial A |}{| A |} \ : \  A \subseteq V(G), 0 < | A | \leq \tfrac{1}{2} | V(G)| \right\}.$$

The Cheeger constant is strictly positive if and only if G is a connected graph. Intuitively, if the Cheeger constant is small but positive, then there exists a "bottleneck", in the sense that there are two "large" sets of vertices with "few" links (edges) between them. The Cheeger constant is "large" if any possible division of the vertex set into two subsets has "many" links between those two subsets.

== Example: computer networking ==
Ring network layout

In applications to theoretical computer science, one wishes to devise network configurations for which the Cheeger constant is high (at least, bounded away from zero) even when |V(G)| (the number of computers in the network) is large.

For example, consider a ring network of N ≥ 3 computers, thought of as a graph G_{N}. Number the computers 1, 2, ..., N clockwise around the ring. Mathematically, the vertex set and the edge set are given by:

$$\begin{align}
V(G_{N}) &= \{ 1, 2, \cdots, N-1, N \} \\
E(G_{N}) &= \big\{ \{1, 2\}, \{2, 3\}, \cdots, \{N - 1, N\}, \{N, 1\} \big\}
\end{align}$$

Take A to be a collection of $\left \lfloor \tfrac{N}{2} \right \rfloor$ of these computers in a connected chain:

$$A = \left \{ 1, 2, \cdots, \left \lfloor \tfrac{N}{2} \right \rfloor \right \}.$$

So,

$$\partial A = \left \{ \left \{ \left \lfloor \tfrac{N}{2} \right \rfloor, \left \lfloor \tfrac{N}{2} \right \rfloor + 1 \right \}, \{N, 1\} \right \},$$

and

$$\frac{| \partial A |}{| A |} = \frac{2}{\left \lfloor \tfrac{N}{2} \right \rfloor} \to 0 \mbox{ as } N \to \infty.$$

This example provides an upper bound for the Cheeger constant h(G_{N}), which also tends to zero as N → ∞. Consequently, we would regard a ring network as highly "bottlenecked" for large N, and this is highly undesirable in practical terms. We would only need one of the computers on the ring to fail, and network performance would be greatly reduced. If two non-adjacent computers were to fail, the network would split into two disconnected components.

== Cheeger inequalities ==
The Cheeger constant is especially important in the context of expander graphs as it is a way to measure the edge expansion of a graph. The so-called Cheeger inequalities relate the eigenvalue gap of a graph with its Cheeger constant. More explicitly, for $G\neq K_1,K_2,K_3$, we have

$$2h(G) \geq \lambda \geq \frac{h^2(G)}{2 \Delta(G)}$$

in which $\Delta(G)$ is the maximum degree for the nodes in $G$ and $\lambda$ is the spectral gap of the Laplacian matrix of the graph. The Cheeger inequality is a fundamental result and motivation for spectral graph theory.

== See also ==
- Spectral graph theory
- Algebraic connectivity
- Cheeger bound
- Conductance
- Connectivity
- Expander graph
