= Institute for Computer-Aided Reasoning in Mathematics =

US research institute

The Institute for Computer-Aided Reasoning in Mathematics (ICARM) is a research institute at Carnegie Mellon University. It is funded by the U.S. National Science Foundation.

== Leadership ==
Members include:

- Jeremy Avigad, director
- Marijn Heule
- Prasad Tetali

== Palomar registry ==
Palomar is a registry of Lean verified mathematics, incubated by ICARM and the Lean FRO. Palomar's board includes some ICARM staff, as well as Bryna Kra, Terence Tao, Ravi Vakil, and Akshay Venkatesh. Kra noted in October 2026 that OpenAI had been encouraged to use Palomar, without success.
