= Gapped Hamiltonian =

In many-body physics, most commonly within condensed-matter physics, a gapped Hamiltonian is a Hamiltonian for an infinitely large many-body system where there is a finite energy gap separating the (possibly degenerate) ground space from the first excited states. A Hamiltonian that is not gapped is called gapless.

The property of being gapped or gapless is formally defined through a sequence of Hamiltonians on finite lattices in the thermodynamic limit.

An example is the BCS Hamiltonian in the theory of superconductivity.

In quantum many-body systems, ground states of gapped Hamiltonians have exponential decay of correlations.

In quantum field theory, a continuum limit of many-body physics, a gapped Hamiltonian induces a mass gap.
