= David Gregory Ebin =

American mathematician (born 1942)

- Born: October 24, 1942 (age 83); Los Angeles, California, U.S.
- Citizenship: American
- Education: Harvard University (BA, 1964); Massachusetts Institute of Technology (PhD, 1967)
- Known for: Space of Riemannian metrics; Infinite-dimensional manifolds; Mathematical hydrodynamics
- Awards: Fellow of the American Mathematical Society (2012)
- Scientific career
- Fields: Differential geometry
- Workplaces: University of California, Berkeley; Stony Brook University; UCLA; École Polytechnique; University of Paris VII; Courant Institute of Mathematical Sciences
- Doctoral advisor: Isadore Singer

David Gregory Ebin (born 24 October 1942, Los Angeles) is an American mathematician, specializing in differential geometry.

Ebin received in 1964 from Harvard University his bachelor's degree and in 1967 his Ph.D. from Massachusetts Institute of Technology under Isadore Singer with thesis On the space of Riemannian metrics. From 1968 to 1969 Ebin was a lecturer at the University of California, Berkeley. He became in 1969 an associate professor and in 1978 a full professor at the Stony Brook University.

Ebin in the academic years 1983–1984 and 1991–1992 was a visiting professor at UCLA, in 1971 a docent at the École Polytechnique and the University of Paris VII, and in 1976 a member of the Courant Institute in New York. He was elected a Fellow of the American Mathematical Society in 2012.

His research deals with differential geometry, infinite-dimensional manifolds (in hydrodynamics and in his treatment of the space of Riemannian metrics), nonlinear partial differential equations, mathematical hydrodynamics (including slightly compressible fluids), and elastodynamics. He investigated in his dissertation the space of Riemannian metrics on a compact manifold and gave this infinite-dimensional space a Riemannian structure.

In 1970 he was, with Jerrold Marsden, an Invited Speaker with talk On the motion of incompressible fluids at the ICM in Nice.

Ebin is since 1971 married to Barbara Jean Ebin and has four children.

== Selected publications ==
- with Jeff Cheeger: Comparison theorems in Riemannian Geometry, North Holland 1975
- On the space of Riemannian metrics, Bulletin of the AMS, vol. 74, 1968, pp. 1001–1003
- The space of Riemannian Metrics, in S. S. Chern, Stephen Smale (eds.), Global Geometry, AMS 1970
- with Jerrold Marsden: Groups of diffeomorphisms and the solution of the classical Euler equations for a perfect fluid, Bulletin of the American Mathematical Society, vol. 75, 1969, pp. 962–967
- with Jerrold Marsden, Arthur E. Fischer: Diffeomorphism groups, hydrodynamics and relativity. In: Proceedings of the 13th Biennial Seminar of Canadian Mathematical Congress, Canadian Mathematical Congress 1972, pp. 135–279
- with Jerrold Marsden: Groups of diffeomorphisms and the motion of an incompressible fluid, Annals of Mathematics, vol. 92, 1970, pp. 102–163
