= Gerald Schwarz =

American mathematician

Gerald W Schwarz
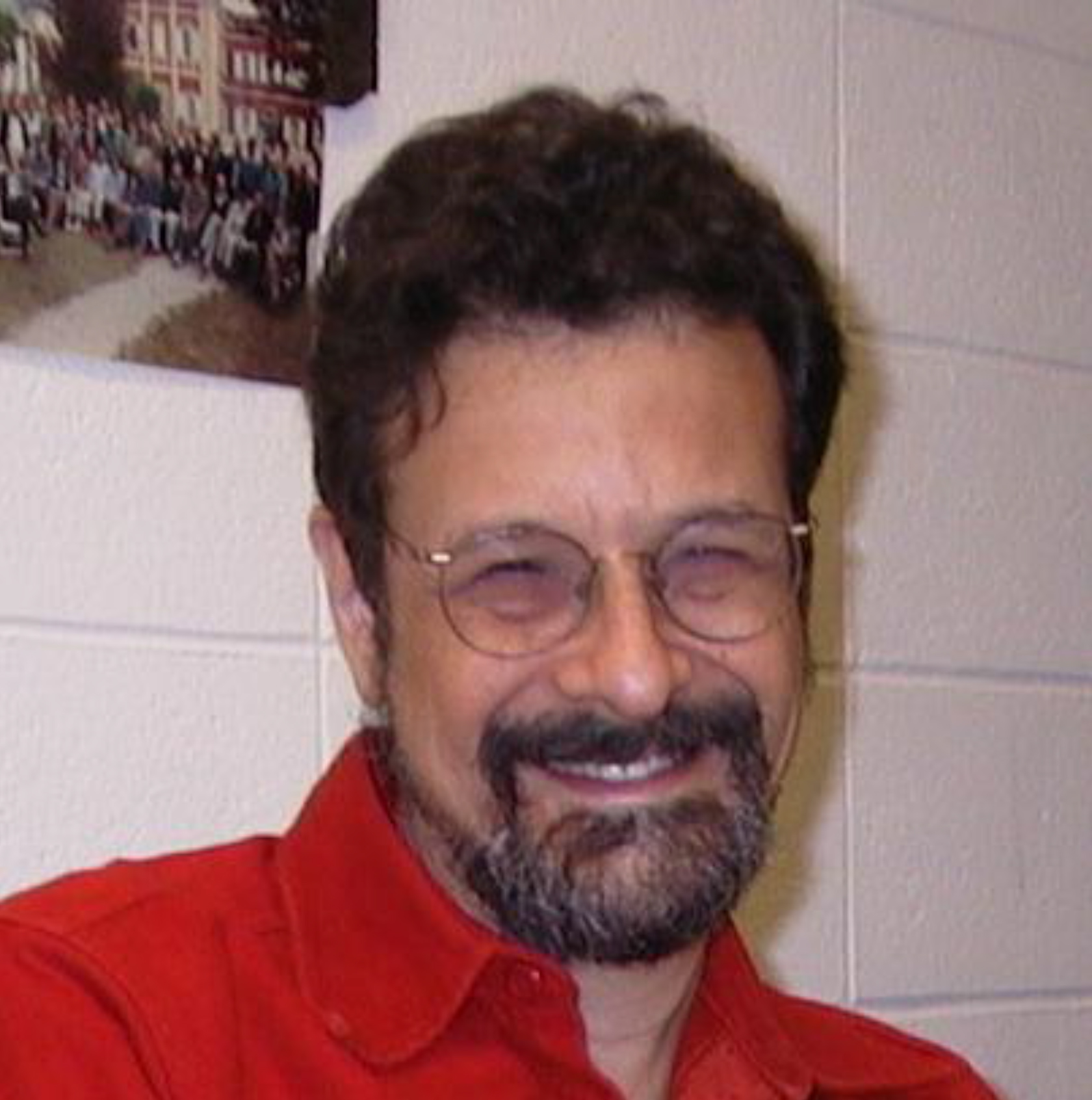
- Born: 15 February 1946 (age 80); Portland, Oregon
- Education: Massachusetts Institute of Technology
- Spouse: Margery Kravitz
- Scientific career
- Fields: Mathematics
- Workplaces: Brandeis University
- Thesis: Q-Manifolds (1972)
- Doctoral advisor: Isadore M Singer

Gerald Walter Schwarz (born February 15, 1946, Portland, Oregon, United States) is an American mathematician and Professor Emeritus at Brandeis University. Schwarz specializes in invariant theory, algebraic group actions and invariant differential operators.

== Early life and education ==
Of German descent, Schwarz's father, Ernst, was one of the 30,000 Jews seized during Kristallnacht. He was imprisoned at the Buchenwald concentration camp until his wife, Elaine, managed to secure a visa to travel abroad. Upon his release from the camp, the couple fled to England where Gerald's older brother, Maurice, was born. In November 1939, Ernst, Elaine and Maurice arrived in the United States, eventually settling in Portland, Oregon. Gerald was born seven years later. He spent his childhood in Portland, then moved to Cambridge, Massachusetts to attend school.

Schwarz earned his B.S. and M.S. degrees from the Massachusetts Institute of Technology (MIT) in 1969 and his Ph.D. in mathematics from MIT in 1972.

== Career ==
Schwarz began his career at the University of Pennsylvania (1972–74) as a postdoctoral researcher, then joined the faculty at Brandeis University in Waltham, Massachusetts (1974). He spent the next academic year at the Institute for Advanced Study in Princeton, New Jersey (1975–76), where he recognized that the solution of the homotopy/isotopy lifting problem requires algebraic groups. The resulting theorem helps mathematicians classify smooth compact lie group actions on manifolds. The proof of the theorem appears in the paper Lifting smooth homotopies of orbit spaces and led to a tenured position at Brandeis in 1978. Four years later, Schwarz was promoted to full Professor.

Schwarz has written or co-authored over 60 journal articles in the field of mathematics. In 1996, he was one of the founding editors of the journal Transformation Groups, and continued as one of its Managing Editors until February 2000. In 2012, he became a member of the inaugural class of fellows of the American Mathematical Society which recognizes mathematicians who have made significant contributions to the field.

== Honors ==
- Poste Rouge, Centre National de Recherche Scientifiques (1996)
- Invited Speaker, International Congress of Mathematicians, Zürich (1994)
- Member, Institut des Hautes Études Scientifiques (1982)
- Member, Institute for Advanced Study (1975)

== Selected publications ==
- Smooth functions invariant under the action of a compact Lie group, Topology 14 (1975), 63–68.
- Representations of simple Lie groups with regular rings of invariants, Inventiones mathematicae 49 (1978), 167–191.
- Lifting smooth homotopies of orbit spaces, Publications Mathématiques de l'Institut des Hautes Études Scientifiques 51 (1980), 37–132.
- (with C. Procesi) Inequalities defining orbit spaces, Inventiones mathematicae 81 (1985), 539–554.
- Invariant theory of G_{2} and Spin_{7}, Commentarii Mathematici Helvetici (1988), 624–663.
- (with H. Kraft) Reductive groups actions with one-dimensional quotient, Publications Mathématiques de l'Institut des Hautes Études Scientifiques. 76 (1993), 1-97.
- (with D. Wehlau) Invariants of four subspaces, Ann. Inst. Fourier, 48 No. 3 (1998) 667–697.
- Lifting differential operators from orbit spaces, Annales scientifiques de l'École Normale Supérieure. Sup. 28 (1995), 253-305
- (with P. Heinzner) Cartan decomposition of the moment map, Mathematische Annalen 337 (2007), 197–232.
- (with L. Helminck) Real double coset spaces and their invariants, Journal of Algebra. 322 (2009), 219-236
- (with F. Kutzschebauch and F. Larusson) Sufficient Conditions for Holomorphic Linearisation, arXiv:1503.00794 (2015).
