= Krackhardt E/I Ratio =

Concept in social network analysis

The Krackhardt E/I Ratio (or variously the E-I Index) is a social network measure which the relative density of internal connections within a social group compared to the number of connections that group has to the external world. It was so described in a 1988 paper by David Krackhardt and Robert N. Stern noting the increased effectiveness in moments of crisis of organizations which had stronger informal networks that crossed formal internal group structures.

== Comparisons with network theory ==
The E/I ratio is related to the concept of conductance, which measures the likelihood that a random walk on a subgraph will exit that subgraph.

== See also ==
- Conductance (graph)
- Percolation
