= Xin Zhou =

Chinese mathematician

Xin Zhou is a mathematician known for his contributions in scattering theory, integrable systems, random matrices and Riemann–Hilbert problems.

He is Professor Emeritus of Mathematics at Duke University. Zhou had obtained M.Sc. from the University of the Chinese Academy of Sciences in 1982 and then got his Ph.D. in 1988 from the University of Rochester. He received the Pólya prize in 1998 and was awarded with the Guggenheim Fellowship in 1999. He is most well known for his work with Percy Deift on the steepest descent method for oscillatory Riemann–Hilbert problems.
