= Jeremy Avigad =

American mathematician and philosopher (born 1968)

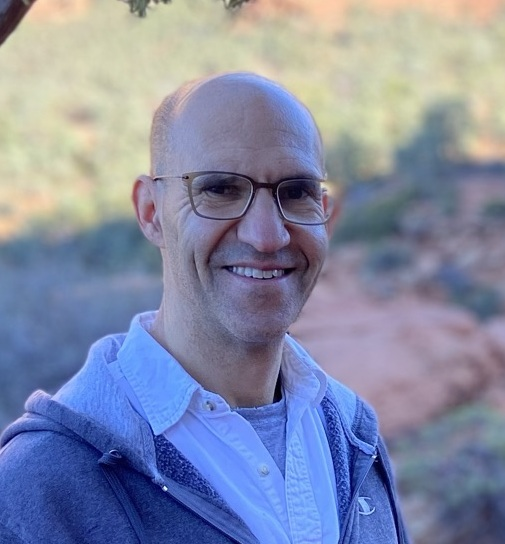
- Avigad in 2021
- Born: January 9, 1968 (age 58); New York City

Education
- Doctoral advisor: Jack Silver

Philosophical work
- Era: Contemporary philosophy
- Region: Western philosophy
- School: Analytic
- Main interests: Logic, philosophy of mathematics, proof theory, formal verification
- Website: www.andrew.cmu.edu/user/avigad/

Jeremy Avigad is a professor of philosophy and a professor of mathematical sciences at Carnegie Mellon University.

He received a B.A. in mathematics from Harvard University in 1989, and a Ph.D. in mathematics from the University of California at Berkeley in 1995 under the supervision of Jack Silver. He has contributed to the areas of mathematical logic and foundations, formal verification and interactive theorem proving, and the philosophy and history of mathematics. He became Director of the Hoskinson Center for Formal Mathematics at Carnegie Mellon University after cryptocurrency entrepreneur Charles Hoskinson donated $20 million in September 2021 to establish it.

== See also ==
- Institute for Computer-Aided Reasoning in Mathematics
