= Nancy K. Stanton =

American mathematician

Nancy Kahn Stanton
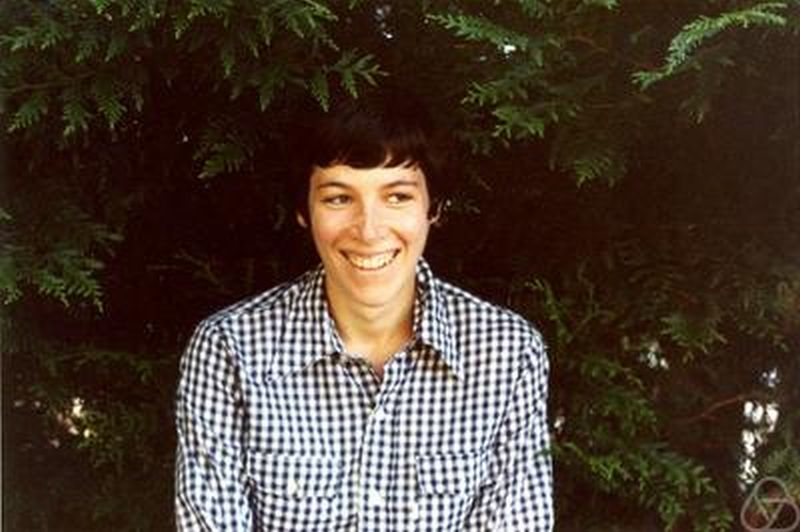
- Education: Massachusetts Institute of Technology
- Known for: Complex analysis, partial differential equations, and differential geometry
- Awards: Fellow of the American Mathematical Society; Sloan Fellowship
- Scientific career
- Fields: Mathematics
- Workplaces: University of Notre Dame
- Thesis: Holomorphic R-Torsion for Lie Groups (1973)
- Doctoral advisor: Isadore Singer

Nancy Kahn Stanton is a professor emeritus of mathematics at University of Notre Dame. She is known for her research in complex analysis, partial differential equations, and differential geometry.

== Career ==
Stanton received her Ph.D. from Massachusetts Institute of Technology in 1973 under Isadore Singer. Stanton now works at University of Notre Dame.

== Awards and honors ==
In 1981, Stanton became a Sloan Research Fellow.

In 2012, Stanton became a fellow of the American Mathematical Society.

== Selected publications ==
- Stanton, Nancy K. Infinitesimal CR automorphisms of real hypersurfaces. Amer. J. Math. 118 (1996), no. 1, 209–233.
- Beals, Richard; Greiner, Peter C.; Stanton, Nancy K. The heat equation on a CR manifold. J. Differential Geom. 20 (1984), no. 2, 343–387.
- Stanton, Nancy K. Infinitesimal CR automorphisms of rigid hypersurfaces. Amer. J. Math. 117 (1995), no. 1, 141–167.
- Pinsky, Mark A.; Stanton, Nancy K.; Trapa, Peter E. Fourier series of radial functions in several variables. J. Funct. Anal. 116 (1993), no. 1, 111–132.
