= Prasad V. Tetali =

Indian-American mathematician and computer scientist

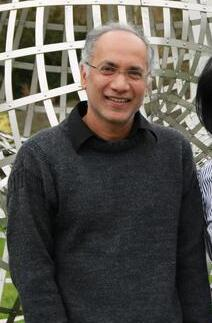
- Prasad Tetali, Oberwolfach 2013
- Born: Visakhapatnam, India
- Education: New York University
- Scientific career
- Fields: probability theory, discrete mathematics, approximation algorithms
- Workplaces: Carnegie Mellon University; Georgia Tech
- Doctoral advisor: Joel Spencer
- Doctoral students: Adam Marcus

Prasad V. Tetali is an Indian-American mathematician and computer scientist who works as a professor at Carnegie Mellon University. His research concerns probability theory, discrete mathematics, and approximation algorithms.

Tetali was born in Visakhapatnam, India but is now a United States citizen. He graduated from Andhra University in 1984, earned a master's degree in computer science in 1986 from the Indian Institute of Science, and completed his doctorate in 1991 at the Courant Institute of Mathematical Sciences of New York University under the supervision of Joel Spencer. After postdoctoral studies, he joined the School of Mathematics at Georgia Tech in 1994, and added a joint appointment in computing in 2001. At Georgia Tech, his doctoral students have included Adam Marcus. He was editor-in-chief of SIAM Journal on Discrete Mathematics from 2009 to 2011. He moved to Carnegie Mellon University in 2021 to become the head of the Department of Mathematical Sciences.

Tetali became a fellow of the Society for Industrial and Applied Mathematics in 2009, and one of the inaugural fellows of the American Mathematical Society in 2012.

== See also ==
- Institute for Computer-Aided Reasoning in Mathematics
