= Miroslav Fiedler =

Czech mathematician (1926–2015)

- Born: 7 April 1926; Prague, Czechoslovakia
- Died: 20 November 2015 (aged 89)
- Education: Charles University, Prague
- Scientific career
- Fields: Linear algebra Graph theory Euclidean geometry
- Workplaces: Institute of Computer Science, The Czech Academy of Sciences
- Website: www.cs.cas.cz/fiedler/

Miroslav Fiedler (7 April 1926 – 20 November 2015) was a Czech mathematician known for his contributions to linear algebra, graph theory and algebraic graph theory.

His article, "Algebraic Connectivity of Graphs", published in the Czechoslovak Math Journal in 1973, established the use of the eigenvalues of the Laplacian matrix of a graph to create tools for measuring algebraic connectivity in algebraic graph theory. Fiedler is honored by the Fiedler eigenvalue (the second smallest eigenvalue of the graph Laplacian), with its associated Fiedler eigenvector, as the names for the quantities that characterize algebraic connectivity. Since Fiedler's original contribution, this structure has become essential to large areas of research in network theory, flocking, distributed control, clustering, multi-robot applications and image segmentation.
