= Cheeger bound =

In mathematics, the Cheeger bound is a bound of the second largest eigenvalue of the transition matrix of a finite-state, discrete-time, reversible stationary Markov chain. It can be seen as a special case of Cheeger inequalities in expander graphs.

Let $X$ be a finite set and let $K(x,y)$ be the transition probability for a reversible Markov chain on $X$. Assume this chain has stationary distribution $\pi$.

Define

$$Q(x,y) = \pi(x) K(x,y)$$

and for $A,B \subset X$ define

$$Q(A \times B) = \sum_{x \in A, y \in B} Q(x,y).$$

Define the constant $\Phi$ as

$$\Phi = \min_{S \subset X, \pi(S) \leq \frac{1}{2}} \frac{Q (S \times S^c)}{\pi(S)}.$$

The operator $K,$ acting on the space of functions from $|X|$ to $\mathbb{R}$, defined by

$$(K \phi)(x) = \sum_y K(x,y) \phi(y)$$

has eigenvalues $\lambda_1 \geq \lambda_2 \geq \cdots \geq \lambda_n$. It is known that $\lambda_1 = 1$. The Cheeger bound is a bound on the second largest eigenvalue $\lambda_2$.

Theorem (Cheeger bound):

$$1 - 2 \Phi \leq \lambda_2 \leq 1 - \frac{\Phi^2}{2}.$$

== See also ==
- Stochastic matrix
- Cheeger constant
- Conductance
