= George Pólya Prize =

The Society for Industrial and Applied Mathematics (SIAM) has three prizes named after George Pólya: the George Pólya Prize for Mathematical Exposition, established in 2013; the George Pólya Prize in Applied Combinatorics, established in 1969, and first awarded in 1971; and the George Pólya Prize in Mathematics, established in 1992, to complement the exposition and applied combinatorics prizes.

Frank Harary and William T. Tutte donated money to establish the original 1969 prize in combinatorics. Currently, funding for the three SIAM prizes is provided by the estate of Stella Pólya, the wife of George Pólya.

== Combinatorics Winners ==
- 1971 Ronald L. Graham, Klaus Leeb, B. L. Rothschild, A. W. Hales, and R. I. Jewett
- 1975 Richard P. Stanley, Endre Szemerédi, and Richard M. Wilson
- 1979 László Lovász
- 1983 Anders Björner and Paul Seymour
- 1987 Andrew Yao
- 1992 Gil Kalai and Saharon Shelah
- 1994 Gregory Chudnovsky and Harry Kesten
- 1996 Jeff Kahn and David Reimer
- 1998 Percy Deift, Xin Zhou, and Peter Sarnak
- 2000 Noga Alon
- 2002 Craig Tracy and Harold Widom
- 2004 Neil Robertson and Paul Seymour
- 2006 Gregory F. Lawler, Oded Schramm, Wendelin Werner
- 2008 Van H. Vu
- 2010 Emmanuel Candès and Terence Tao
- 2012 Vojtěch Rödl and Mathias Schacht
- 2014 Adam Marcus, Daniel Spielman and Nikhil Srivastava
- 2016 Jozsef Balogh, Robert Morris, and Wojciech Samotij, David Saxton and Andrew Thomason
- 2018 No Award Given
- 2021 Assefaw Gebremedhin, Fredrik Manne, Alex Pothen
- 2022 Antti Kupiainen, Rémi Rhodes, Vincent Vargas

(List of winners from Pólya Prize page at SIAM website.)

== See also ==
- List of mathematics awards
