= Adam Marcus (mathematician) =

American mathematician (born 1979)

Adam W. Marcus
- Born: 1979 (age 46–47); United States
- Education: Georgia Institute of Technology; Washington University in St. Louis
- Awards: König Prize (2008); Pólya Prize (2014); Michael and Sheila Held Prize (2021)
- Scientific career
- Fields: Mathematics
- Workplaces: EPFL; Princeton University; Yale University
- Doctoral advisor: Prasad Tetali

Adam Wade Marcus (born 1979) is an American mathematician. He held the Chair of Combinatorial Analysis in the Institute of Mathematics at the École Polytechnique Fédérale de Lausanne until February 2023. The team of Marcus, Daniel Spielman and Nikhil Srivastava was awarded the Pólya Prize in 2014 for their resolution of the Kadison–Singer problem and later the Michael and Sheila Held Prize in 2021 for their solution to long-standing conjectures in the study of Ramanujan graphs.

== History ==
Marcus grew up in Marietta, Georgia and was a boarding student at the Darlington School in Rome, Georgia. He attended the Washington University in St. Louis for his undergraduate degree, where he was a Compton Fellow. He then completed his doctoral studies under the supervision of Prasad Tetali at the Georgia Institute of Technology. Following his graduation in 2008, he spent four years as a Gibbs Assistant Professor in Applied Mathematics at Yale University. In 2012, Marcus cofounded Crisply, an analytics company in Boston, Massachusetts, where he served as chief scientist until 2015. After leaving Crisply, Marcus spent five years as an assistant professor in the mathematics department and program in applied and computational mathematics at Princeton University before moving to EPFL in 2020. He is an alumnus of the Hampshire College Summer Studies in Mathematics.

== Awards ==
During 2003–2004, Marcus was a Fulbright scholar in Hungary. In 2008, he was awarded the inaugural Dénes König Prize in Discrete Mathematics from the Society for Industrial and Applied Mathematics for his work in solving the Stanley–Wilf conjecture. A team consisting of Marcus, Daniel Spielman, and Nikhil Srivastava was awarded the 2014 Pólya Prize for their resolution of the Kadison–Singer problem. He was an invited speaker at the 2014 International Congress of Mathematicians in Seoul, South Korea. The team of Marcus, Spielman, and Srivastava was also awarded the 2021 Michael and Sheila Held Prize for their work in resolving the Kadison–Singer problem and their solution to long-standing conjectures in the study of Ramanujan graphs.

== Publications ==
- Marcus, A.; Tardos, G. (2004), "Excluded permutation matrices and the Stanley–Wilf conjecture", Journal of Combinatorial Theory, Series A, 107 (1): 153–160, doi:10.1016/j.jcta.2004.04.002.
- Marcus, Adam W.; Spielman, Daniel A.; Srivastava, Nikhil (2015), "Interlacing families I: Bipartite Ramanujan graphs of all degrees", Annals of Mathematics, 182 (1): 307–325, arXiv:1304.4132, doi:10.4007/annals.2015.182.1.7.
- Marcus, Adam W.; Spielman, Daniel A.; Srivastava, Nikhil (2015), "Interlacing Families II: Mixed Characteristic Polynomials and the Kadison–Singer problem", Annals of Mathematics, 182 (1): 327–350, arXiv:1306.3969, doi:10.4007/annals.2015.182.1.8, S2CID 17580893.
