= Mass gap =

Energy difference between ground state and lightest excited state(s)

In quantum field theory, the mass gap is the difference in energy between the lowest energy state, the vacuum, and the next lowest energy state. The energy of the vacuum is zero by definition, and assuming that all energy states can be thought of as particles in plane-waves, the mass gap is the mass of the lightest particle.

Since the energies of exact (i.e. nonperturbative) energy eigenstates are spread out and therefore are not technically eigenstates, a more precise definition is that the mass gap is the greatest lower bound of the energy of any state which is orthogonal to the vacuum.

The analog of a mass gap in many-body physics on a discrete lattice arises from a gapped Hamiltonian.

== Mathematical definitions ==
For a given real-valued quantum field $\phi(x)$, where $x = (\boldsymbol{x},t)$, we can say that the theory has a mass gap if the two-point function has the property

$$\langle\phi(0,t)\phi(0,0)\rangle\sim \sum_nA_n\exp\left(-\Delta_nt\right)$$

with $\Delta_0>0$ being the lowest energy value in the spectrum of the Hamiltonian and thus the mass gap. This quantity, easy to generalize to other fields, is what is generally measured in lattice computations. It was proved in this way that Yang–Mills theory develops a mass gap on a lattice. The corresponding time-ordered value, the propagator, will have the property

$$\lim_{p\rightarrow 0}\Delta(p)=\mathrm{constant}$$

with the constant being finite. A typical example is offered by a free massive particle and, in this case, the constant has the value 1/m^{2}. In the same limit, the propagator for a massless particle is singular.

== Examples from classical theories ==
An example of mass gap arising for massless theories, already at the classical level, can be seen in spontaneous breaking of symmetry or the Higgs mechanism. In the former case, one has to cope with the appearance of massless excitations, Goldstone bosons, that are removed in the latter case due to gauge freedom. Quantization preserves this gauge freedom property.

A quartic massless scalar field theory develops a mass gap already at classical level. Consider the equation

$$\Box\phi+\lambda\phi^3=0.$$

This equation has the exact solution

$$\phi(x)=\mu\left(\frac{2}{\lambda}\right)^\frac{1}{4}{\rm sn}\left(p\cdot x+\theta,-1\right)$$
—where $\mu$ and $\theta$ are integration constants, and sn is a Jacobi elliptic function—provided

$$p^2=\mu^2\sqrt{\frac{\lambda}{2}}.$$

At the classical level, a mass gap appears while, at quantum level, one has a tower of excitations, and this property of the theory is preserved after quantization in the limit of momenta going to zero.

== Yang–Mills theory ==
While lattice computations have suggested that Yang–Mills theory indeed has a mass gap and a tower of excitations, a theoretical proof is still missing. This is one of the Clay Institute Millennium problems and it remains an open problem. Such states for Yang–Mills theory should be physical states, named glueballs, and should be observable in the laboratory.

== Källén–Lehmann representation ==
If Källén–Lehmann spectral representation holds, at this stage we exclude gauge theories, the spectral density function can take a very simple form with a discrete spectrum starting with a mass gap

$$\rho(\mu^2)=\sum_{n=1}^NZ_n\delta(\mu^2-m_n^2)+\rho_c(\mu^2)$$

being $\rho_c(\mu^2)$ the contribution from multi-particle part of the spectrum. In this case, the propagator will take the simple form

$$\Delta(p)=\sum_{n=1}^N\frac{Z_n}{p^2-m^2_n+i\epsilon}+\int_{4m_N^2}^\infty d\mu^2\rho_c(\mu^2)\frac{1}{p^2-\mu^2+i\epsilon}$$

being $4m_N^2$ approximatively the starting point of the multi-particle sector. Now, using the fact that

$$\int_0^\infty d\mu^2\rho(\mu^2)=1$$

we arrive at the following conclusion for the constants in the spectral density

$$1=\sum_{n=1}^NZ_n+\int_0^\infty d\mu^2\rho_c(\mu^2)$$.

This could not be true in a gauge theory. Rather it must be proved that a Källén–Lehmann representation for the propagator holds also for this case. Absence of multi-particle contributions implies that the theory is trivial, as no bound states appear in the theory and so there is no interaction, even if the theory has a mass gap. In this case we have immediately the propagator just setting $\rho_c(\mu^2)=0$ in the formulas above.

== See also ==
- Coleman–Mandula theorem
- Scalar field theory
