= Daniel Spielman =

American computer scientist

- Born: March 1970 (age 56); Philadelphia, Pennsylvania, U.S.
- Education: Yale University; Massachusetts Institute of Technology
- Known for: Smoothed analysis
- Awards: Gödel Prize (2008, 2015); Fulkerson Prize (2009); Nevanlinna Prize (2010); MacArthur Fellowship (2012); Pólya Prize (2014); Michael and Sheila Held Prize (2021); Breakthrough Prize in Mathematics (2022)
- Scientific career
- Fields: Computer science
- Workplaces: Yale University
- Thesis: Computationally Efficient Error-Correcting Codes and Holographic Proofs (1995)
- Doctoral advisor: Michael Sipser
- Doctoral students: Nikhil Srivastava

Daniel Alan Spielman (born March 1970 in Philadelphia, Pennsylvania) has been a professor of applied mathematics and computer science at Yale University since 2006. As of 2018, he is the Sterling Professor of Computer Science at Yale. He is also the co-director of the Yale Institute for Network Science, since its founding, and chair of the newly established Department of Statistics and Data Science.

== Education ==
Spielman was born in Philadelphia in 1970 to a Jewish family. His father was a lawyer, and his mother was a speech therapist who taught at Temple University.

He attended the Philadelphia School and Germantown Friends School. He received his bachelor of arts degree in mathematics and computer science from Yale University in 1992 and a PhD in applied mathematics from MIT in 1995 (his dissertation was called "Computationally Efficient Error-Correcting Codes and Holographic Proofs"). From 1996 to 2005, he taught in the mathematics department at MIT.

== Awards ==
Spielman and his collaborator Shang-Hua Teng have jointly won the Gödel Prize twice: in 2008 for their work on smoothed analysis of algorithms, and in 2015 for their work on nearly-linear-time Laplacian solvers.

In 2010, Spielman was awarded the Nevanlinna Prize "for smoothed analysis of Linear Programming, algorithms for graph-based codes and applications of graph theory to Numerical Computing", and in the same year, he was named a fellow of the Association for Computing Machinery.

He gave a plenary lecture at the International Congress of Mathematicians in 2010.

In 2012, Spielman was part of the inaugural class of Simons Investigators, which provides $660,000 for five years for curiosity-driven research.

In October 2012, he was named a recipient of the MacArthur Fellowship.

In 2013, together with Adam Marcus and Nikhil Srivastava, Spielman provided a positive solution to the Kadison–Singer problem, a result that was awarded the 2014 Pólya Prize.

In 2017, he was elected to the National Academy of Sciences.

In 2022, he won the Breakthrough Prize in Mathematics "for breakthrough contributions to theoretical computer science and mathematics, including to spectral graph theory, the Kadison–Singer problem, numerical linear algebra, optimization, and coding theory."

Spielman was elected to the 2026 class of Fellows of the American Mathematical Society.
