= Energy gap =

Forbidden energy state in solid state physics

In solid-state physics, an energy gap or band gap is an energy range in a solid where no electron states exist, i.e. an energy range where the density of states vanishes.

Especially in condensed matter physics, an energy gap is often known more abstractly as a spectral gap, a term which need not be specific to electrons or solids.

== Band gap ==
If an energy gap exists in the band structure of a material, it is called band gap. The physical properties of semiconductors are to a large extent determined by their band gaps, but also for insulators and metals the band structure—and thus any possible band gaps—govern their electronic properties.

== Superconductors ==
For superconductors the energy gap is a region of suppressed density of states around the Fermi energy, with the size of the energy gap much smaller than the energy scale of the band structure. The superconducting energy gap is a key aspect in the theoretical description of superconductivity and thus features prominently in BCS theory. Here, the size of the energy gap indicates the energy gain for two electrons upon formation of a Cooper pair. If a conventional superconducting material is cooled from its metallic state (at higher temperatures) into the superconducting state, then the superconducting energy gap is absent above the critical temperature $T_{\rm c}$, it starts to open upon entering the superconducting state at $T_{\rm c}$, and it grows upon further cooling. BCS theory predicts that the size $\Delta$ of the superconducting energy gap for conventional superconductors at zero temperature scales with their critical temperature $T_{\rm c}$: $\Delta(T=0)=1.764 \, k_{\rm B} T_{\rm c}$ (with Boltzmann constant $k_{\rm B}$).

== Pseudogap ==
If the density of states is suppressed near the Fermi energy but does not fully vanish, then this suppression is called pseudogap. Pseudogaps are experimentally observed in a variety of material classes; a prominent example are the cuprate high-temperature superconductors.

== Hard gap vs. soft gap ==
If the density of states vanishes over an extended energy range, then this is called a hard gap. If instead the density of states exactly vanishes only for a single energy value (while being suppressed, but not vanishing for nearby energy values), then this is called a soft gap. A prototypical example of a soft gap is the Coulomb gap that exists in localized electron states with Coulomb interaction.
