= Approximation in algebraic groups =

In algebraic group theory, approximation theorems are an extension of the Chinese remainder theorem to algebraic groups G over global fields k.

== History ==
Eichler (1938) proved strong approximation for some classical groups. Strong approximation was established in the 1960s and 1970s, for semisimple simply-connected algebraic groups over global fields. The results for number fields are due to Kneser (1966) and Platonov (1969); the function field case, over finite fields, is due to Margulis (1977) and Prasad (1977). In the number field case Platonov also proved a related result over local fields called the Kneser–Tits conjecture.

== Formal definitions and properties ==
Let G be a linear algebraic group over a global field k, and A the adele ring of k. If S is a non-empty finite set of places of k, then we write A^{S} for the ring of S-adeles and A_{S} for the product of the completions k_{s}, for s in the finite set S. For any choice of S, G(k) embeds in G(A_{S}) and G(A^{S}).

The question asked in weak approximation is whether the embedding of G(k) in G(A_{S}) has dense image. If the group G is connected and k-rational, then it satisfies weak approximation with respect to any set S (Platonov & Rapinchuk 1994, p.402). More generally, for any connected group G, there is a finite set T of finite places of k such that G satisfies weak approximation with respect to any set S that is disjoint with T (Platonov & Rapinchuk 1994, p.415). In particular, if k is an algebraic number field then any connected group G satisfies weak approximation with respect to the set S = S_{∞} of infinite places.

The question asked in strong approximation is whether the embedding of G(k) in G(A^{S}) has dense image, or equivalently whether the set

G(k)G(A_{S})

is a dense subset in G(A). The main theorem of strong approximation (Kneser 1966, p.188) states that a non-solvable linear algebraic group G over a global field k has strong approximation for the finite set S if and only if its radical N is unipotent, G/N is simply connected, and each almost simple component H of G/N has a non-compact component H_{s} for some s in S (depending on H).

The proofs of strong approximation depended on the Hasse principle for algebraic groups, which for groups of type E_{8} was only proved several years later.

Weak approximation holds for a broader class of groups, including adjoint groups and inner forms of Chevalley groups, showing that the strong approximation property is restrictive.

== See also ==
- Superstrong approximation
