= Nikhil Srivastava =

California, US-based mathematician

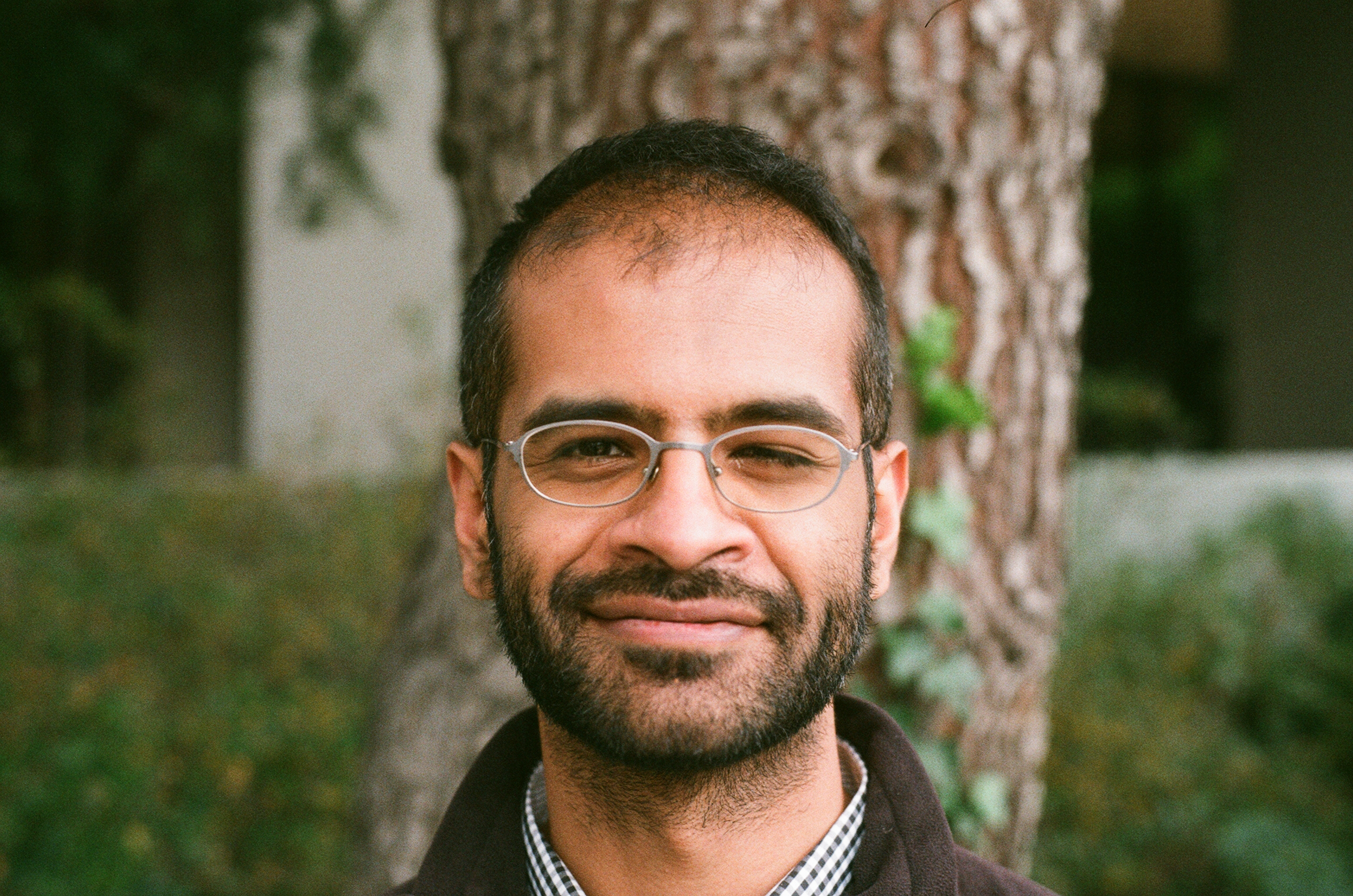
- Education: Union College; Yale University
- Known for: Kadison-Singer problem
- Awards: Pólya Prize (2014); Michael and Sheila Held Prize (2021)
- Scientific career
- Fields: Computer Science; Mathematics
- Workplaces: University of California, Berkeley
- Thesis: Spectral Sparsification and Restricted Invertibility (2010)
- Doctoral advisor: Daniel Spielman
- Website: math.berkeley.edu/~nikhil/

Nikhil Srivastava is an associate professor of Mathematics at University of California, Berkeley. In July 2014, he was named a recipient of the Pólya Prize with Adam Marcus and Daniel Spielman.

== Early life and education ==
Nikhil Srivastava was born New Delhi, India. He attended Union College in Schenectady, New York, graduating summa cum laude with a Bachelor of Science degree in mathematics and computer science in 2005. He received a PhD in computer science from Yale University in 2010 (his dissertation was called "Spectral Sparsification and Restricted Invertibility").

== Awards ==
In 2013, together with Adam Marcus and Daniel Spielman, he provided a positive solution to the Kadison–Singer problem, a result that was awarded the 2014 Pólya Prize.

He gave an invited lecture at the International Congress of Mathematicians in 2014. He jointly won the 2021 Michael and Sheila Held Prize along with two others for solving long-standing questions on the Kadison-Singer problem and on Ramanujan graphs.

In 2022 The Ciprian Foias Prize in Operator Theory was awarded to Adam Marcus, Daniel Spielman, and Srivastava for their notable work in Operator Theory that was published in the preceding six years.
