= Cheeger constant =

Constant in Riemannian geometry

In Riemannian geometry, the Cheeger isoperimetric constant of a compact Riemannian manifold M is a positive real number h(M) defined in terms of the minimal area of a hypersurface that divides M into two disjoint pieces. In 1971, Jeff Cheeger proved an inequality that related the first nontrivial eigenvalue of the Laplace–Beltrami operator on M to h(M). In 1982, Peter Buser proved a reverse version of this inequality, and the two inequalities put together are sometimes called the Cheeger-Buser inequality. These inequalities were highly influential not only in Riemannian geometry and global analysis, but also in the theory of Markov chains and in graph theory, where they have inspired the analogous Cheeger constant of a graph and the notion of conductance.

== Definition ==
Let M be an n-dimensional closed Riemannian manifold. Let V(A) denote the volume of an n-dimensional submanifold A and S(E) denote the n−1-dimensional volume of a submanifold E (commonly called "area" in this context). The Cheeger isoperimetric constant of M is defined to be

$$h(M)=\inf_E \frac{S(E)}{\min(V(A), V(B))},$$

where the infimum is taken over all smooth n−1-dimensional submanifolds E of M which divide it into two disjoint submanifolds A and B. The isoperimetric constant may be defined more generally for noncompact Riemannian manifolds of finite volume.

If the manifold is compact with boundary, the infimum is taken over the submanifolds E which do not intersect the boundary, and the volume of the denominator is that of the disjoint piece whose boundary is only E. In the non-compact case with infinite volume, the infimum is taken over compact submanifolds E and the denominator corresponds to the volume of the bounded piece.

== Cheeger's inequality ==
Jeff Cheeger proved a lower bound for the smallest positive eigenvalue ${\lambda_1(M)}$ of the Laplacian on M in term of what is now called the Cheeger isoperimetric constant h(M):

$$\lambda_1(M)\geq \frac{h^2(M)}{4}.$$

This inequality is optimal in the following sense: for any h > 0, natural number k, and ε > 0, there exists a two-dimensional Riemannian manifold M with the isoperimetric constant h(M) = h and such that the kth eigenvalue of the Laplacian is within ε from the Cheeger bound.

== Buser's inequality ==
Peter Buser proved an upper bound for the smallest positive eigenvalue $\lambda_1(M)$ of the Laplacian on M in terms of the Cheeger isoperimetric constant h(M). Let M be an n-dimensional closed Riemannian manifold whose Ricci curvature is bounded below by −(n−1)a^{2}, where a ≥ 0. Then

$$\lambda_1(M)\leq  2a(n-1)h(M) + 10h^2(M).$$

== See also ==
- Cheeger constant (graph theory)
- Isoperimetric problem
- Spectral gap
