= Spectral gap =

Mathematical concept

In mathematics, the spectral gap is the difference between the moduli of the two largest eigenvalues of a matrix or operator; alternately, it is sometimes taken as the smallest non-zero eigenvalue. Various theorems relate this difference to other properties of the system. The spectral gap gets its name from the matrix spectrum, that is, for a matrix, the list of its eigenvalues. It provides insight on diffusion within the graph: corresponding the spectral gap to the smallest non-zero eigenvalue, it is then the mode of the network state that shows the slowest exponential decay over time.

== See also ==
- Cheeger constant (graph theory)
- Cheeger constant (Riemannian geometry)
- Eigengap
- Spectral gap (physics)
- Spectral radius
- Spectral gap conjecture
