= List of Graduate Center, CUNY faculty =

This a partial list of notable faculty (either past, present, or visiting) at the Graduate Center of the City University of New York.

== Awards and prizes ==
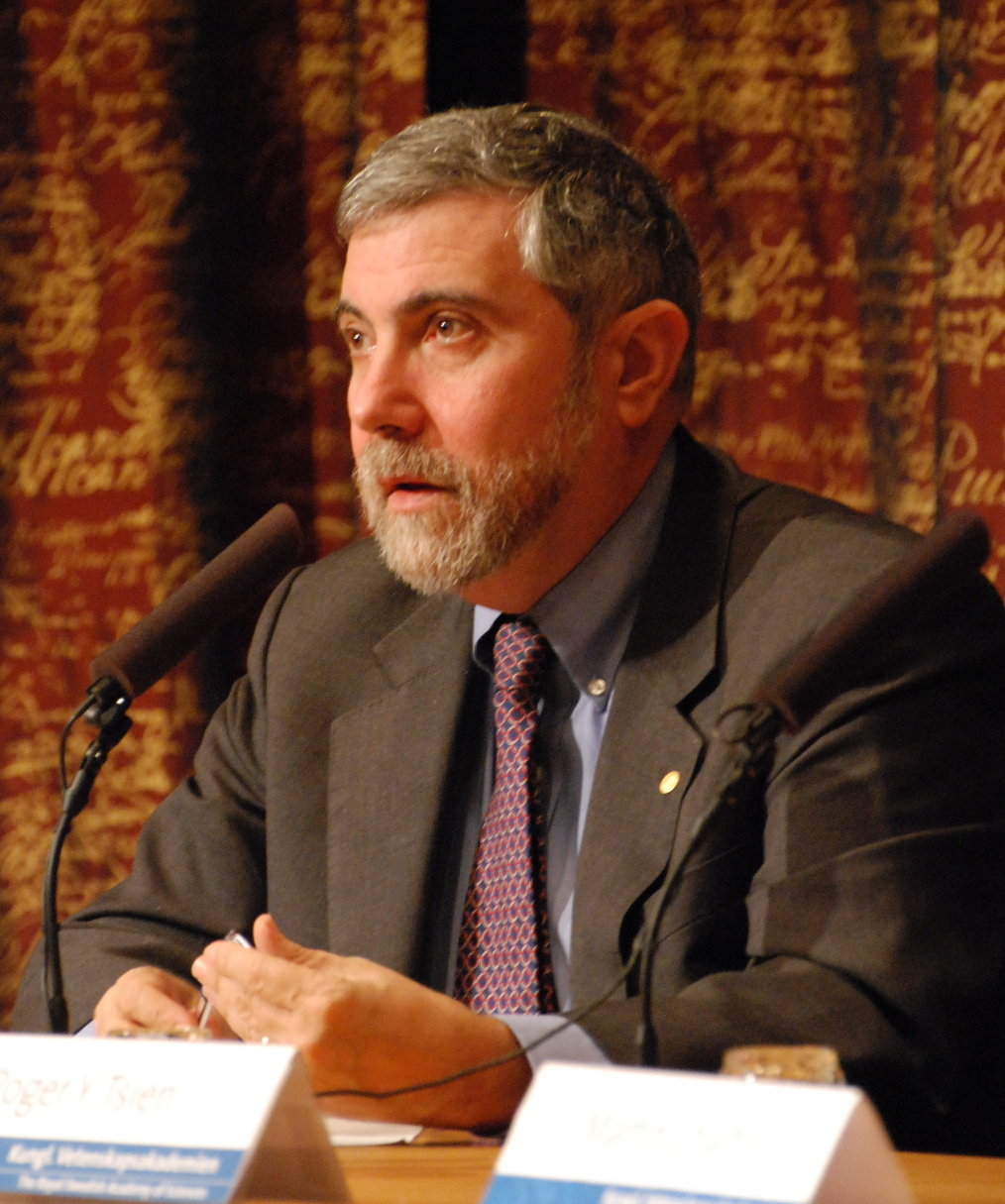
Krugman in 2008

Among the Graduate Center's faculty are recipients of the Pulitzer Prize, Nobel Prize, Lakatos Award, National Medals of Humanities and Science, Bancroft Prize, Grammy Award, Guggenheim Fellowship, George Jean Nathan Award for Dramatic Criticism, New York City Mayor's Award for Excellence in Science and Technology, Lakatos Award, and Presidential Early Career Award for Scientists and Engineers, as well as memberships in the American Academy of Arts and Sciences and National Academy of Sciences.

=== Nobel laureates ===
In 1997, Queens College recruited future Nobel laureate and co-discoverer of the human immunodeficiency virus Luc Montagnier, appointing him to an endowed professorship. He was subsequently added to the faculty of the Graduate Center in the department of biology.

In 2015, the Graduate Center recruited Nobel laureate Paul Krugman to the faculty. He joined the faculty on a dual appointment, both to the university's Ph.D. program in economics and as a distinguished scholar at the Graduate Center's Stone Center on Socio-Economic Inequality. At the Stone Center, Krugman's colleagues include political scientist and sociologist Janet Gornick as well as economist Branko Milanovic.

=== American Academy of the Arts and Sciences ===
Name	Relation to the Graduate Center	Year inducted	Reference
Ervand Abrahamian	Distinguished Professor of History	2010	
Richard Alba	Distinguished Professor of Sociology	2017	
Mary Ann Caws	Distinguished Professor Emerita of Comparative Literature, English, and French	2009	
Nancy Foner	Distinguished Professor of Sociology	2011	
David Harvey	Distinguished Professor of Anthropology and Earth and Environmental Sciences	2007	
Saul Kripke	Distinguished Professor of Philosophy	1978	
Charles Mills	Distinguished Professor of Philosophy	2017	
Ursula Oppens	Distinguished Professor of Music	1999	
Eve Sedgwick	Distinguished Professor of English	2005	
Dennis Sullivan	Albert Einstein Chair in Science (Mathematics)	1991	
Leo Treitler	Distinguished Professor of Music	1994	
Sheldon Weinbaum	Distinguished Professor Emeritus of Biomedical and Mechanical Engineering	2013	

=== National Academy of Sciences ===
Name	Relation to the Graduate Center	Year inducted	Reference
Andreas Acrivos	Albert Einstein Professor of Science and Engineering Emeritus	1991	
William Bialek	Visiting Presidential Professor of Physics	2012	
Myriam Sarachik	Distinguished Professor of Physics	1994	
Dennis Sullivan	Albert Einstein Chair in Science (Mathematics)	1983	
Sheldon Weinbaum	Distinguished Professor Emeritus of Biomedical and Mechanical Engineering	2002	

=== Guggenheim Fellows ===
Name	Relation to the Graduate Center	Year awarded	Reference
André Aciman	Distinguished Professor of Comparative Literature and French	1997	
Esther Allen	Professor of Latin American, Iberian, and Latino Cultures at Baruch College and the Graduate Center	2018	
Marshall Berman	Distinguished Professor of Political Science	1981	
Joshua Brown	Former executive director of the American Social History Project	2010	
Mary Ann Caws	Distinguished Professor of English, French and Comparative Literature	1972	
Janet Dean Fodor	Distinguished Professor of Linguistics	1993	
Jerry Fodor	Former Distinguished Professor of Philosophy	1972	
Nancy Foner	Distinguished Professor of Sociology	2017	
Dagmar Herzog	Distinguished Professor of History	2012	
Lev Manovich	Professor of Computer Science	2002	
Louis Menand	Former Distinguished Professor of English	1990	
Nancy K. Miller	Distinguished Professor of English, Comparative Literature, and French	1989	
Francis Fox Piven	Distinguished Professor Emeritus of Sociology and Political Science	1973	
Robert Reid-Pharr	Professor of English	2016	

=== MacArthur Fellows ===
Name	Relation to the Graduate Center	Year awarded	Reference
Ralph Shapey	Distinguished Professor of Music	1982	
Nancy Siraisi	Distinguished Professor Emerita of History	2008	
Eric Wolf	Distinguished Professor of Anthropology	1990	

=== Pulitzer Prize ===
Name	Relation to the Graduate Center	Year(s) awarded	Reference
John Corigliano	Distinguished Professor of Music	2001	
David Del Tredici	Distinguished Professor of Music at the Graduate Center and the City College of New York	1980	
Louis Menand	Former Distinguished Professor of English	2002	
Arthur M. Schlesinger Jr.	Former Albert Schweitzer Professor Emeritus of the Humanities	1946, 1966	
Mike Wallace	Distinguished Professor of History at the Graduate Center and the John Jay College of Criminal Justice	1999	

=== National Medal of Arts ===
Name	Relation to the Graduate Center	Year awarded	Reference
Gregory Rabassa	Distinguished Professor of Comparative Literature, Hispanic and Luso-Brazilian Literatures	2006	

=== National Medal of Science ===
Name	Relation to the Graduate Center	Year awarded	Reference
Dennis Sullivan	Albert Einstein Chair in Science (Mathematics)	2004	

=== Rolf Schock Prize ===
Name	Relation to the Graduate Center	Year awarded	Reference
Saul Kripke	Distinguished Professor of Philosophy	2001	

=== Alan T. Waterman Award ===
Name	Relation to the Graduate Center	Year awarded	Reference
Andrea Alù	Einstein Professor of Physics	2015	

=== Presidential Early Career Award for Scientists and Engineers ===
Name	Relation to the Graduate Center	Year awarded	Reference
Alexander Gamburd	Presidential Professor of Mathematics	2008	

=== Grammy Award ===
Name	Relation to the Graduate Center	Year(s) awarded	Reference
John Corigliano	Distinguished Professor of Music	2014, 2009, 2009, 1997, 1992	
Ursula Oppens	Distinguished Professor of Music	2016	

=== Bancroft Prize ===
Name	Relation to the Graduate Center	Year awarded	Reference
David Nasaw	Arthur M. Schlesinger Jr. Professor of History	2001	
David S. Reynolds	Distinguished Professor of English	1996	

== Notable faculty by department ==
The Graduate Center's employment of faculty operates according to a unique consortium model, which both hosts 140 faculty with sole appointments exclusively at the Graduate Center, often senior scholars in their respective disciplines, and provides joint appointments to 1,800 faculty from the thirteen senior colleges and seven community colleges in the CUNY system to teach classes and advise graduate students.

=== Anthropology ===
- Talal Asad, Distinguished Professor of Anthropology
- Vincent Crapanzano, Distinguished Professor of Anthropology and Comparative Literature
- Haskel Greenfield, Distinguished Professor of Anthropology at University of Manitoba
- David Harvey, Distinguished Professor of Anthropology
- Eleanor Leacock, former professor of anthropology at the Graduate Center and the City College of New York
- Setha Low, professor of Anthropology
- Leith Mullings, Distinguished Professor of Anthropology
- Sydel Silverman, former Distinguished Professor of Anthropology at the Graduate Center and Queens College
- Katherine Verdery, Distinguished Professor of Anthropology
- Bianca Williams, associate professor of Anthropology
- Eric Wolf, former Distinguished Professor of Anthropology

=== Art History ===
- Claire Bishop, professor of art history
- Rosemarie Haag Bletter, professor emeritus of 19th- and 20th-century European and American architecture and theory
- Anna C. Chave, professor emeritus of contemporary art and theory, 20th-century European and American art
- William H. Gerdts, professor emeritus of 18th- and 19th-century American painting and sculpture
- David Joselit, distinguished professor of art history
- Rosalind E. Krauss, former distinguished professor at the Graduate Center and Hunter College
- Gail Levin, distinguished professor of 20th-century and contemporary art
- Patricia Mainardi, professor emeritus of 18th- and 19th-century European art at the Graduate Center and Brooklyn College
- Eloise Quiñones Keber, professor emeritus of Pre-Columbian art and colonial art of the Americas at the Graduate Center and Baruch College

=== Classics ===
- Joy Connolly, Distinguished Professor and interim president
- Sarah B. Pomeroy, professor emeritus

=== Computer Science ===
- Sergei N. Artemov, Distinguished Professor of Computer Science
- Melvin Fitting, professor emeritus of Computer Science at the Graduate Center and the City College of New York
- Robert Haralick, Distinguished Professor of Computer Science
- Gabor Herman, Distinguished Professor of Computer Science
- Saul Kripke, Distinguished Professor of Computer Science and Philosophy
- Lev Manovich, professor of Computer Science
- Victor Pan, Distinguished Professor of Computer Science
- Rohit Jivanlal Parikh, Distinguished Professor of Computer Science and Philosophy at the Graduate Center and Brooklyn College
- Theodore Raphan, Distinguished Professor of Computer Science
- Stathis Zachos, professor emeritus of Computer Science at the Graduate Center and Brooklyn College

=== Earth and Environmental Sciences ===
- Ruth Wilson Gilmore, professor of Geography
- Neil Smith, former Distinguished Professor of Geography

=== Economics ===
- Robert D. Cherry, professor of Economics at the Graduate Center and Brooklyn College
- Randall K. Filer, professor of Economics at the Graduate Center and Hunter College
- Michael Grossman, Distinguished Professor Emeritus of Economics
- David A. Jaeger, professor of Economics
- Ted Joyce, professor of Economics at the Graduate Center and Baruch College
- Paul Krugman, Distinguished Professor of Economics
- Charlotte F. Muller, professor emerita of Economics
- Salih Neftçi, former professor of Economics

=== English ===
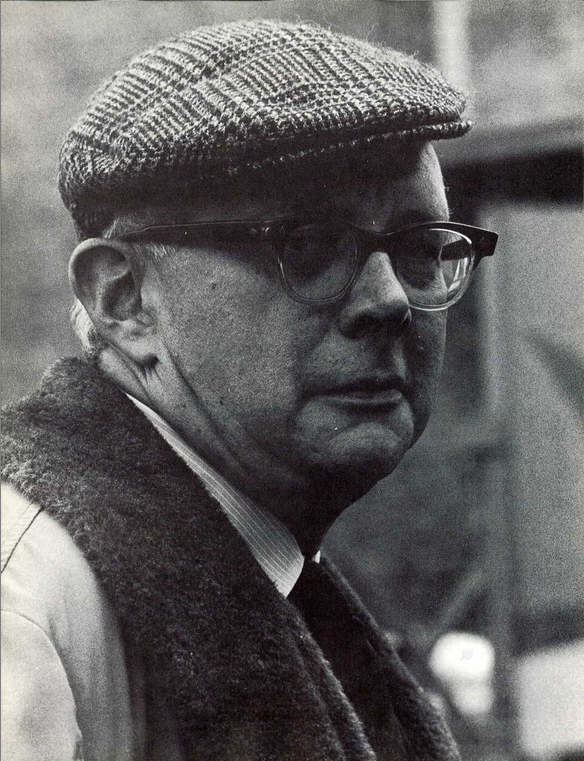
Irving Howe, Distinguished Professor of English, 1970-1986

- Ammiel Alcalay, professor of English at the Graduate Center and Queens College
- Meena Alexander, former Distinguished Professor of English at the Graduate Center and Hunter College
- John Brenkman, Distinguished Professor of English at the Graduate Center and Baruch College
- Mary Ann Caws, Distinguished Professor of English
- Cathy Davidson, Distinguished Professor of English
- Ashley Dawson, professor of English at the Graduate Center and the College of Staten Island
- Morris Dickstein, Distinguished Professor Emeritus, senior fellow at the Center for the Humanities
- David Greetham, Distinguished Professor Emeritus at the Graduate Center and Bronx Community College
- N. John Hall, Distinguished Professor Emeritus
- bell hooks, former Distinguished Professor of English at the Graduate Center and the City College of New York
- Irving Howe, former Distinguished Professor of English at the Graduate Center and Hunter College
- Fred Kaplan, Distinguished Professor Emeritus at the Graduate Center and Queens College
- Alfred Kazin, former Distinguished Professor Emeritus of English at Hunter College and the Graduate Center
- Wayne Koestenbaum, Distinguished Professor of English
- Eric Lott, professor of English
- Louis Menand, former Distinguished Professor of English
- Nancy K. Miller, Distinguished Professor of English
- Feisal G. Mohamed, professor of English
- Robert Reid-Pharr, professor of English
- David S. Reynolds, Distinguished Professor
- David Savran, Distinguished Professor of English, Vera Mowry Roberts Chair in American Theatre
- Eve Sedgwick, former Distinguished Professor of English
- Ira Shor, professor of English at the Graduate Center and the College of Staten Island
- Michele Wallace, professor of English at the Graduate Center and the City College of New York

=== French ===
- John Kneller, former professor emeritus of French at the Graduate Center and Brooklyn College

=== History ===
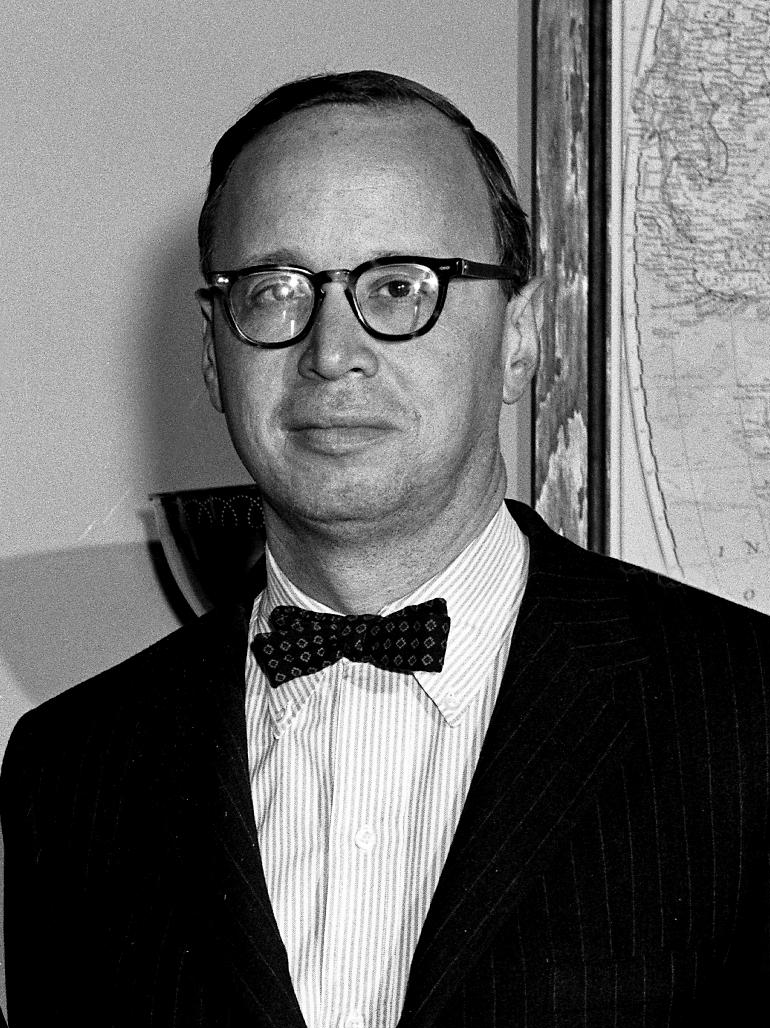
Arthur M. Schlesinger Jr., Albert Schweitzer Professor of Humanities, 1966–1994

- Paul Avrich, former Distinguished Professor of History at the Graduate Center and Queens College
- Laird Bergad, Distinguished Professor of History at the Graduate Center and Lehman College
- Randolph L. Braham, former Distinguished Professor Emeritus of History at Hunter College and the City College of New York
- Joshua Brown, adjunct professor and executive director of the American Social History Project and the Center for Media and Learning
- Blanche Wiesen Cook, Distinguished Professor of History at the Graduate Center and John Jay College of Criminal Justice
- Eric Foner, former professor of history at the Graduate Center and the City College of New York
- Joshua Freeman, Distinguished Professor of History at the Graduate Center and Queens College
- Herbert Gutman, former Distinguished Professor of History
- Dagmar Herzog, Distinguished Professor
- KC Johnson, professor of History at the Graduate Center and Brooklyn College
- James Oakes, Distinguished Professor
- Arthur M. Schlesinger Jr., former Albert Schweitzer Professor of Humanities
- Joan Wallach Scott, adjunct professor
- Judith Stein, former Distinguished Professor of History at the Graduate Center and the City College of New York
- Clarence Taylor, professor emeritus of History at the Graduate Center and Baruch College
- Mike Wallace, Distinguished Professor of History at the Graduate Center and John Jay College of Criminal Justice
- Eric D. Weitz, Distinguished Professor of History at the Graduate Center and the City College of New York

=== Linguistics ===
- Juliette Blevins, professor of Linguistics
- Janet Dean Fodor, Distinguished Professor of Linguistics
- Loraine Obler, Distinguished Professor of Linguistics
- Virginia Valian, Distinguished Professor of Linguistics at the Graduate Center and Hunter College
- Douglas Whalen, Distinguished Professor of Linguistics

=== Mathematics ===
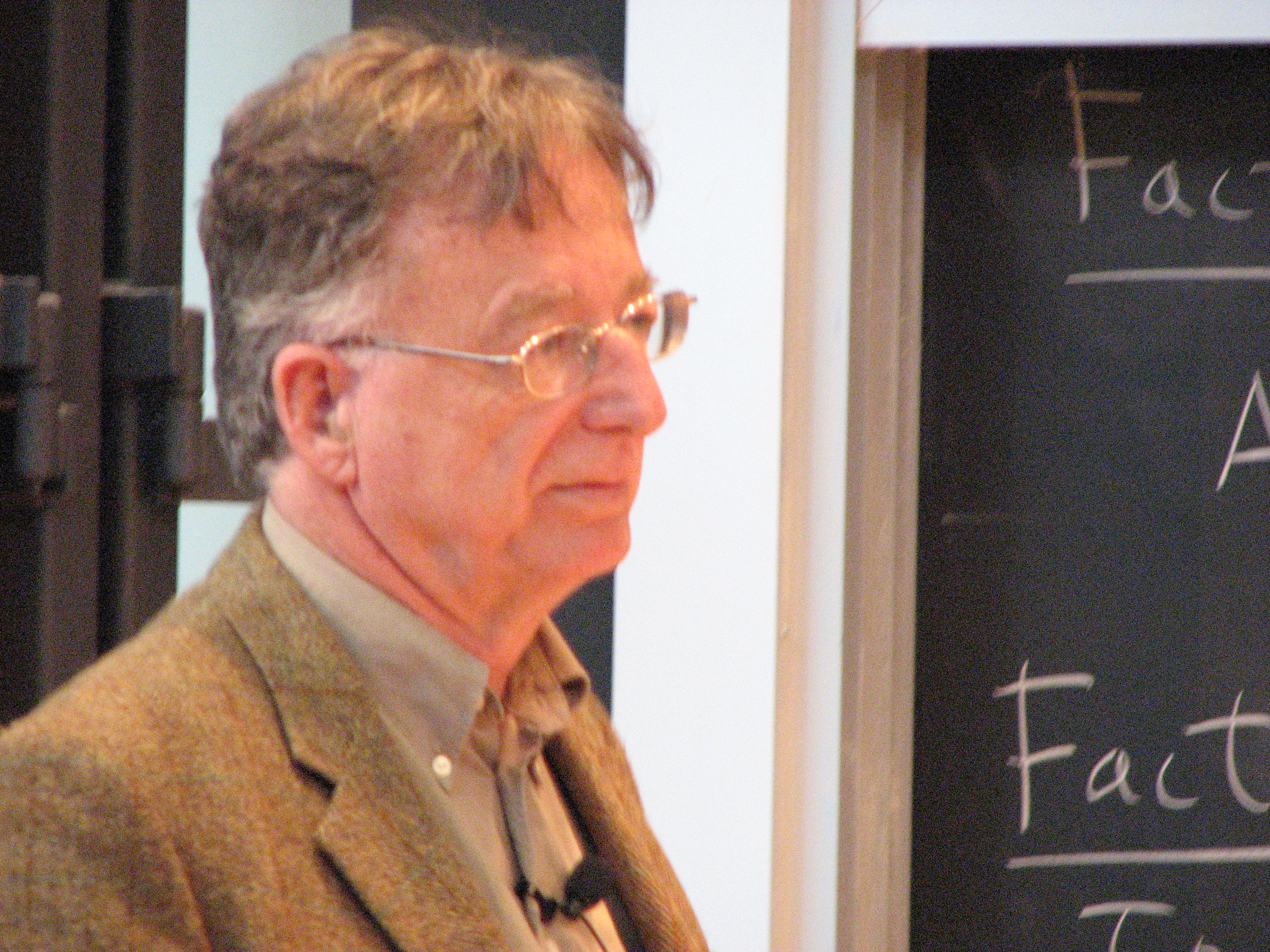
Dennis Sullivan, Albert Einstein Chair in Science (Mathematics) at the CUNY Graduate Center

- Sergei N. Artemov, Distinguished Professor of Mathematics
- Jason Behrstock, professor of Mathematics
- Melvin Fitting, professor emeritus of Mathematics
- Alexander Gamburd, Presidential Professor of Mathematics
- Michael Handel, professor of Mathematics
- Linda Keen, professor emerita of Mathematics
- Olga Kharlampovich, Mary P. Dolciani Professor of Mathematics
- Victor Kolyvagin, Mina Rees Chair in Mathematics
- Ádám Korányi, Distinguished Professor Emeritus of Mathematics
- Ravi S. Kulkarni, Distinguished Professor Emeritus of Mathematics
- Melvyn B. Nathanson, professor of Mathematics
- Rohit Parikh, Distinguished Professor of Mathematics
- Enrique Pujals, professor of Mathematics
- Michael Shub, Martin and Michele Cohen Professor of Mathematics
- Christina Sormani, professor of Mathematics
- Dennis Sullivan, Albert Einstein Chair in Science (Mathematics)
- Lucien Szpiro, Distinguished Professor of Mathematics

=== Philosophy ===
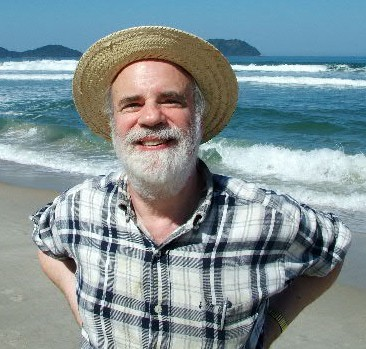
Saul Kripke, Distinguished Professor of Philosophy and Computer Science, 2003-present

- Linda Martín Alcoff, professor of Philosophy
- Noël Carroll, Distinguished Professor of Philosophy
- Michael Devitt, Distinguished Professor of Philosophy
- Melvin Fitting, professor emeritus of Philosophy at the Graduate Center and Lehman College
- Miranda Fricker, Presidential Professor of Philosophy
- Peter Godfrey-Smith, adjunct and former Distinguished Professor of Philosophy
- Carol C. Gould, Distinguished Professor of Philosophy and Political Science, director of the Center for Global Ethics and Politics at the Ralph Bunche Institute for International Studies
- Joel David Hamkins, professor of Philosophy
- Virginia Held, Distinguished Professor Emeritus at the Graduate Center and Hunter College
- Serene Khader, professor of Philosophy at the Graduate Center and Jay Newman Chair in Philosophy of Culture at Brooklyn College
- Saul Kripke, Distinguished Professor of Philosophy and Computer Science
- Douglas P. Lackey, professor of Philosophy at the Graduate Center and Baruch College
- Michael Levin, professor emeritus of Philosophy at the Graduate Center and the City College of New York
- Charles W. Mills, Distinguished Professor of Philosophy
- Stephen Neale, Distinguished Professor of Philosophy and Linguistics and Kornblith Chair in the Philosophy of Science and Value
- David Papineau, visiting Presidential Professor of Philosophy
- Massimo Pigliucci, professor of Philosophy at the Graduate Center and the City College of New York
- Graham Priest, Distinguished Professor of Philosophy
- Jesse Prinz, Distinguished Professor of Philosophy
- David M. Rosenthal, Distinguished Professor of Philosophy
- Nathan Salmon, visiting professor of Philosophy
- Galen Strawson, former Distinguished Professor of Philosophy at the Graduate Center
- Marx Wartofsky, former Distinguished Professor of Philosophy at the Graduate Center and Baruch College

=== Physics ===
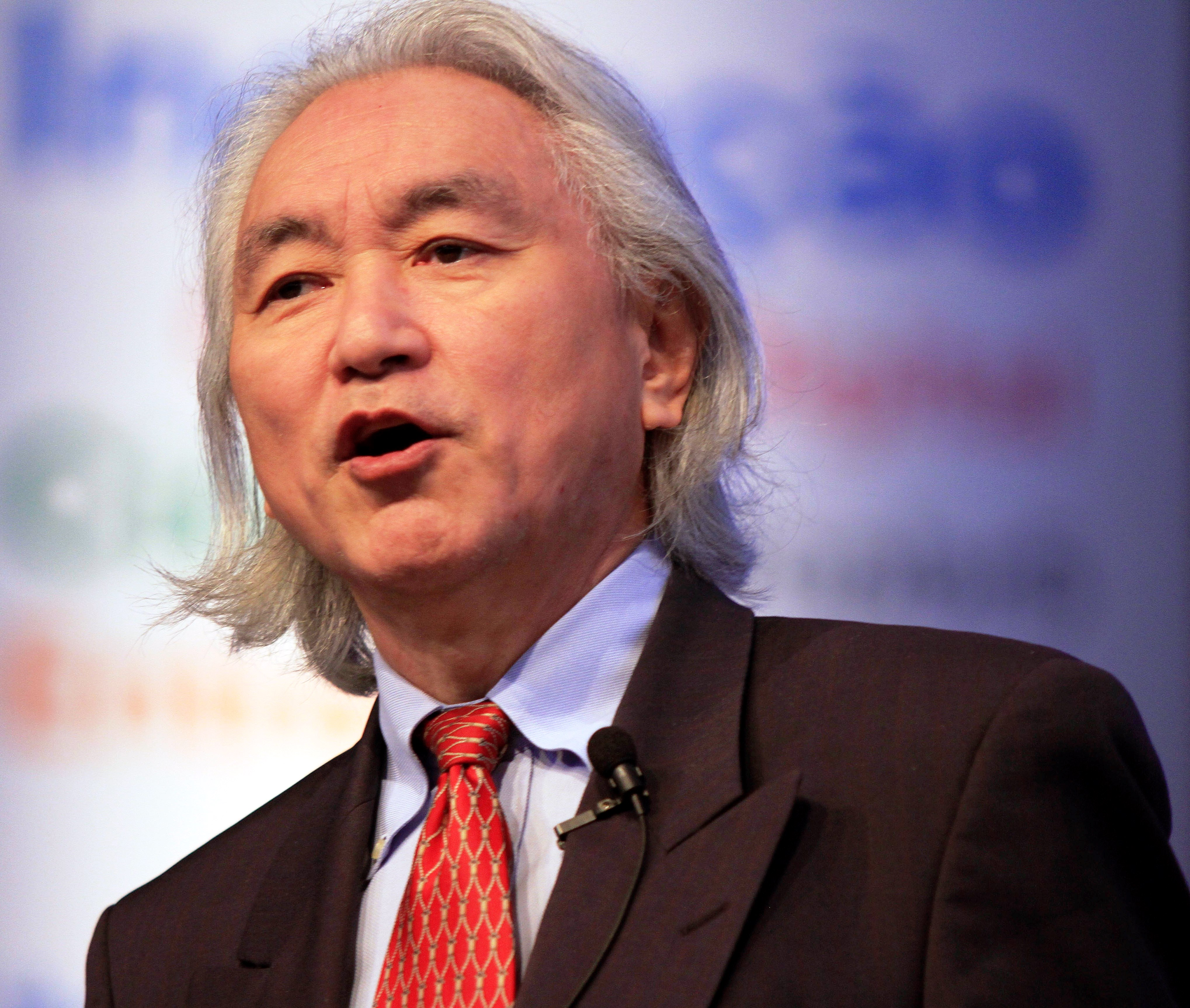
Michio Kaku, Henry Semat Professor of Physics the City College of New York and Graduate Center

- Robert Alfano, Distinguished Professor of Science and Engineering at the City College of New York and Graduate Center
- Andrea Alù, Einstein Professor of Physics and Director of the Photonics Initiative at the Advanced Science Research Center
- William Bialek, visiting Presidential Professor of Physics
- Eugene Chudnovsky, Distinguished Professor of Physics at Lehman College and the Graduate Center
- Dmitry Garanin, professor of Physics at Lehman College and the Graduate Center
- Azriel Z. Genack, Distinguished Professor of Physics at Queens College and the CUNY Graduate Center
- Daniel Greenberger, Distinguished Professor of Physics at the City College of New York and Graduate Center
- Godfrey Gumbs, Distinguished Professor of Physics at Hunter College and Graduate Center
- Michio Kaku, Henry Semat Professor of Physics the City College of New York and Graduate Center
- V. Parmeswaran Nair, Distinguished Professor of Physics at the City College of New York and Graduate Center
- Matthew O'Dowd J., professor of Physics at Lehman College and the Graduate Center
- Xi-Cheng Zhang, assistant professor of Physics

=== Political science ===
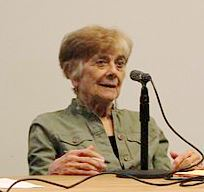
Francis Fox Piven, Distinguished Professor of Political Science, 1982-present

- Randolph L. Braham, Distinguished Professor Emeritus of Political Science at the Graduate Center and City College of New York
- Susan Buck-Morss, Distinguished Professor of Political Science
- Mitchell Cohen, professor of Political Science at the Graduate Center and Baruch College
- Paisley Currah, professor of Political Science at the Graduate Center and Brooklyn College
- Robert Engler, professor emeritus of Political Science at the Graduate Center and New York City College of Technology
- Andrew Hacker, professor emeritus of Political Science at the Graduate Center and Queens College
- Michael Harrington, former Distinguished Professor of Political Science at the Graduate Center and Queens College
- Uday Singh Mehta, Distinguished Professor of Political Science
- Ralph Miliband, former visiting professor of Political Science
- John Mollenkopf, Distinguished Professor of Political Science and Sociology
- Joseph S. Murphy (1933–1998), president of Queens College, president of Bennington College, and chancellor of the City University of New York
- Francis Fox Piven, Distinguished Professor Emeritus of Political Science
- Stanley Renshon, professor of Political Science and Lehman College
- Corey Robin, professor of Political Science at the Graduate Center and Brooklyn College
- Dankwart Rustow, former Distinguished Professor of Political Science and Sociology
- Thomas G. Weiss, Distinguished Professor of Political Science
- Susan L. Woodward, professor of Political Science
- Donald S. Zagoria, professor emeritus of Political Science at the Graduate Center and Hunter College

=== Psychology ===
- Roger Hart, professor of Environmental Psychology and Earth and Environmental Sciences
- Charles Kadushin, professor of Psychology, recipient of the 2009 Marshall Sklare Award
- Cindi Katz, professor of Environmental Psychology and Earth and Environmental Sciences
- Stanley Milgram, former Distinguished Professor of Psychology
- Kevin Nadal, Distinguished Professor of Psychology
- Katherine Nelson, Professor of Psychology
- David Rindskopf, Distinguished Professor of Psychology
- Susan Saegert, professor of Environmental Psychology
- Anna Stetsenko, professor of Human Development and Urban Education

=== Sociology ===
- Stanley Aronowitz, Distinguished Professor Emeritus of Sociology and Urban Education
- Juan Battle, professor of Sociology, Public Health, and Urban Education
- Frank Bonilla, former Thomas Hunter Professor of Sociology at the Graduate Center and Hunter College
- Bogdan Denitch, former professor emeritus of Sociology
- Mitchell Duneier, former Distinguished Professor of Sociology
- Cynthia Fuchs Epstein, Distinguished Professor Emeritus of Sociology
- Stuart Ewen, Distinguished Professor of Sociology at the Graduate Center and Hunter College
- Samuel Farber, professor emeritus of Sociology
- Nancy Foner, Distinguished Professor of Sociology
- Gerald S. Handel, professor emeritus of Sociology at the Graduate Center and the City College of New York
- Michael P. Jacobson, director of CUNY Institute for State and Local Governance
- James M. Jasper, professor of Sociology
- Philip Kasinitz, Presidential Professor of Sociology at the Graduate Center and Hunter College
- Barbara Katz Rothman, professor of Sociology, Public Health, Disability Studies and Women's Studies at the Graduate Center and Baruch College
- Judith Lorber, professor emeritus of Sociology and Women's Studies at the Graduate Center and Brooklyn College
- Setsuko Matsunaga Nishi, former professor emeritus of Sociology at the Graduate Center and Brooklyn College
- Ruth Milkman, Distinguished Professor of Sociology, associate director of the Joseph S. Murphy Institute
- Pyong Gap Min, professor of Sociology at the Graduate Center and Queens College, director of the Research Center for Korean Community
- Peter Moskos, professor of Sociology at the Graduate Center and the John Jay College of Criminal Justice
- Victoria Pitts-Taylor, former professor of sociology at the Graduate Center and Queens College
- Carroll Seron, former professor of sociology at the Graduate Center and Baruch College
- Iván Szelényi, former Distinguished Professor of Sociology
- John Torpey, professor of Sociology and History, director of Ralph Bunche Institute for International Studies
- Bryan Turner, Presidential Professor of Sociology
- Jock Young, Distinguished Professor of Criminal Justice and Sociology
- Sharon Zukin, professor of Sociology at the Graduate Center and Brooklyn College

=== Urban Education ===
- Marc Lamont Hill, Presidential Professor of Urban Education at the Graduate Center
- Anthony Picciano, professor of Urban Education at the Graduate Center and Hunter College
