= Anneli Lax New Mathematical Library =

The Anneli Lax New Mathematical Library is an expository monograph series published by the Mathematical Association of America (MAA). The books in the series are intended for a broad audience, including undergraduates (especially in their first two years of collegiate study), advanced high school students, the general public, and teachers. The American Mathematical Society (AMS) makes available the AMS/MAA Press Archive eBook Collection featuring several MAA book series, including the Anneli Lax New Mathematical Library.

== History ==
The book series was initiated in 1958 with the name New Mathematical Library by the Monograph Project of the School Mathematics Study Group (SMSG) with financing from the National Science Foundation. Anneli Cahn Lax was the editor-in-chief of the series, intended as mathematical expositions written by outstanding mathematicians for an audience not necessarily having advanced mathematical education. The first six volumes in the series were published in 1961 by Random House and the L. W. Singer Company. Ivan Niven wrote volume 1 of the series.

In 1958 there were 13 mathematicians on the series editorial committee, including Lipman Bers, Paul Halmos, Norman Jacobson, Herbert Robbins, Norman Steenrod, James J. Stoker, and Leo Zippin. In 1975, the MAA became the publisher of the New Mathematical library. Upon the death of Anneli Cahn Lax in 1999, the MAA renamed the book series the Anneli Lax New Mathematical Library in her honor.

== Series list ==
- Volume#
- NML/055 2000; ebook 2022 Lost in the Math Museum: A Survival Story - Colin Adams, Williams College, Williamstown, MA
- NML/054 ebook 2022 Hex: A Playful Introduction - Ryan B. Hayward, University of Alberta, Edmonton, AB, Canada
- NML/053 ebook 2000 The Contest Problem Book VI: American High School Mathematics Examinations 1989-1994 - Compiled and augmented by Leo J. Schneider, John Carroll University
- NML/052 ebook 2018 Portal through Mathematics: Journey to Advanced Thinking - O. A. Ivanov, St. Petersburg State University. Translated by Robert G. Burns
- NML/051 ebook 2018 Invitation to Number Theory: Second Edition - Øystein Ore, Yale University. Revised and updated by John J. Watkins, emeritus, Colorado College and Robin Wilson, emeritus, Open University, UK
- NML/050 ebook 2018 Exercises in (Mathematical) Style: Stories of Binomial Coefficients - John McCleary, Vassar College
- NML/049 2017 Ore, Øystein (29 December 2017). "Invitation to Number Theory: Second Edition (book description with abstract)". American Mathematical Society (AMS) Bookstore. American Mathematical Soc. ISBN 978-0883856536. preview at books.google.com
- NML/048 2017 LCCN 2017-939372; pbk ISBN 9780883856529; Exercises in (mathematical) style: stories of binomial coefficients by John McCleary.
- NML/047 2017 LCCN 2016-960274; ISBN 9780883856512; Portal through mathematics: journey to advanced thinking / Oleg A. Ivanov, St. Petersburg State University; translated by Robert G. Burns
- NML/046 ebook 2015 The Riemann Hypothesis - Roland van der Veen, Leiden University and Jan van de Craats, University of Amsterdam
- NML/045 ebook 2015 When Life is Linear: From Computer Graphics to Bracketology - Tim Chartier, Davidson College
- NML/044 ebook 2009 Geometric Transformations IV: Circular Transformations - I. M. Yaglom
- NML/043 ebook 2003 Mathematical Miniatures - Svetoslav Savchev, mathematical journal Matematika and Titu Andreescu, Director of the American Mathematics Competitions [MAA]
- NML/042 ebook 2001 Hungarian Problem Book III: Based on the Eötvös Competitions, 1929–1943 - Translated and edited by Andy Liu, University of Alberta
- NML/041 ebook 2000 The Geometry of Numbers - C. D. Olds, San Jose University, Anneli Lax, New York University and Giuliana Davidoff, Mount Holyoke College
- NML/040 2000 LCCN 00-101675 The contest problem book VI : American high school mathematics examinations 1989-1994 / compiled and augmented by Leo J. Schneider
- NML/039 ebook 1997 Over and Over Again - Gengzhe Chang, University of Science and Technology of China, Hefei, Anhui and Thomas W. Sederberg, Brigham Young University
- NML/038 ebook 1997 Contest Problem Book V: American High School Mathematics Examinations and American Invitational Mathematics Examinations, 1983-1988 - Compiled and augmented by George Berzsenyi, Rose-Hulman Institute of Technology and Stephen B. Maurer, Swarthmore College
- NML/037 ebook 1995 Episodes in Nineteenth and Twentieth Century Euclidean Geometry - Ross Honsberger, University of Waterloo
- NML/036 ebook 1993 Game Theory and Strategy - Philip D. Straffin, Beloit College
- NML/035 ebook 1993 Exploring Mathematics with Your Computer - Arthur Engel, University of Frankfurt
- NML/034 ebook 1990 Graphs and Their Uses - Øystein Ore, Yale University. Revised and updated edition prepared by Robin Wilson, The Open University, England
- NML/033 ebook 1988 USA Mathematical Olympiads 1972-1986 - Murray S. Klamkin
- NML/032 ebook 1987 Riddles of the Sphinx: And Other Mathematical Puzzle Tales - Martin Gardner, Scientific American
- NML/031 ebook 1986 International Mathematical Olympiads 1978–1985: and forty supplemental problems - Compiled and with solutions by Murray S. Klamkin, University of Alberta
- NML/030 ebook 1984 The Role of Mathematics in Science - M. M. Schiffer, Stanford University and Leon Bowden, University of Victoria, B.C.
- NML/029 ebook 1982 The Contest Problem Book IV: Annual High School Mathematics Examinations, 1973–1982 - Compiled and with solutions by Ralph A. Artino, The City College of New York, Anthony M. Gaglione, The U.S. Naval Academy and Niel Shell, The City College of New York
- NML/028 ebook 2006 The Mathematics of Games and Gambling: Second Edition - Edward Packel, Lake Forest College
- NML/027 ebook 1978 International Math Olympiads: 1959–1977 - Compiled and with solutions by Samuel L. Greitzer, Rutgers University
- NML/026 ebook 1977 Mathematical Methods in Science - George Pólya, Stanford University. Edited by Leon Bowden, University of Victoria, B.C.
- NML/025 ebook 1973 The Contest Problem Book III - Compiled and with solutions by Charles T. Salkind, Polytechnic Institute of Brooklyn and James M. Earl, University of Nebraska at Omaha
- NML/024 ebook 1973 Transformations III - I. G. Yaglom. Translated by Abe Shenitzer, York University, Toronto
- NML/023 ebook 1970 Ingenuity in Mathematics - Ross Honsberger, University of Waterloo, Canada
- NML/022 ebook 2009 Elementary Cryptanalysis: A Mathematical Approach, Second Edition - Abraham Sinkov, Arizona State University. Revised and updated by Todd Feil, Denison University
- NML/021 ebook 1968 Geometric Transformations II - I. M. Yaglom. Translated by Allen Shields, University of Michigan
- NML/020 1967 LCCN 75-8600 Invitation to number theory by Øystein Ore
- NML/019 ebook 1967 Geometry Revisited - H. S. M. Coxeter, University of Toronto and S. L. Greitzer, Rutgers University
- NML/018 ebook 1966 First Concepts of Topology: The Geometry of Mappings of Segments, Curves, Circles, and Disks - W. G. Chin, San Francisco Public Schools and N. E. Steenrod, Princeton University
- NML/017 ebook 1966 The Contest Problem Book II: Annual High School Contests 1961–1965 - Compiled and with solutions by Charles T. Salkind, Polytechnic Institute of Brooklyn
- NML/016 ebook 1965 From Pythagoras to Einstein - Kurt O. Friedrichs, Courant Institute of Mathematics
- NML/015 ebook 1965 Mathematics of Choice: How to Count without Counting - Ivan Niven, University of Oregon
- NML/014 ebook 1964 Groups and Their Graphs - Israel Grossman, Albert Leonard Junior High School and Wilhelm Magnus, New York University
- NML/013 ebook 1998 Episodes from the Early History of Mathematics - Asger Aaboe, Yale University; Aaboe, Asger (1963). 1963 1st edition. ISBN 978-0-88385-613-0.
- NML/012 ebook 1963 Hungarian Problem Book II: Based on the Eötvös Competitions, 1906–1928 - Translated by Elvira Rapaport, Brooklyn Polytechnic Institute
- NML/011 ebook 1963 Hungarian Problem Book I: Based on the Eötvös Competitions, 1894–1905 - Translated by Elvira Rapaport, Brooklyn Polytechnic Institute
- NML/010 1963 LCCN 63-9345 Graphs and their uses by Øystein Ore
- NML/009 ebook 1963 Continued Fractions - C. D. Olds, San Jose University
- NML/008 ebook 1962 Geometric Transformations I - I. M. Yaglom. Translated by Allen Shields, University of Michigan
- NML/007 ebook 1962 Uses of Infinity - Leo Zippin, Queens College
- NML/006 ebook 1961 The Lore of Large Numbers - Philip J. Davis, National Bureau of Standards
- NML/005 ebook 1961 The Contest Problem Book I: Annual High School Mathematics Examinations 1950–1960 - Charles T. Salkind, Polytechnic Institute of Brooklyn
- NML/004 ebook 1961 Geometric Inequalities - Nicholas D. Kazarinoff, University of Michigan
- NML/003 ebook 1961 An Introduction to Inequalities - Edwin Beckenbach, University of California, Los Angeles and Richard Bellman, The RAND Corporation
- NML/002 ebook 1962 What Is Calculus About? - W. W. Sawyer, University of Toronto; (1st edition, 1961, Random House)
- NML/001 ebook 2002 Numbers: Rational and Irrational - Ivan Niven, University of Oregon; (1st edition, 1961, Random House)
