= David Hamilton Golland =

American university administrator and historian

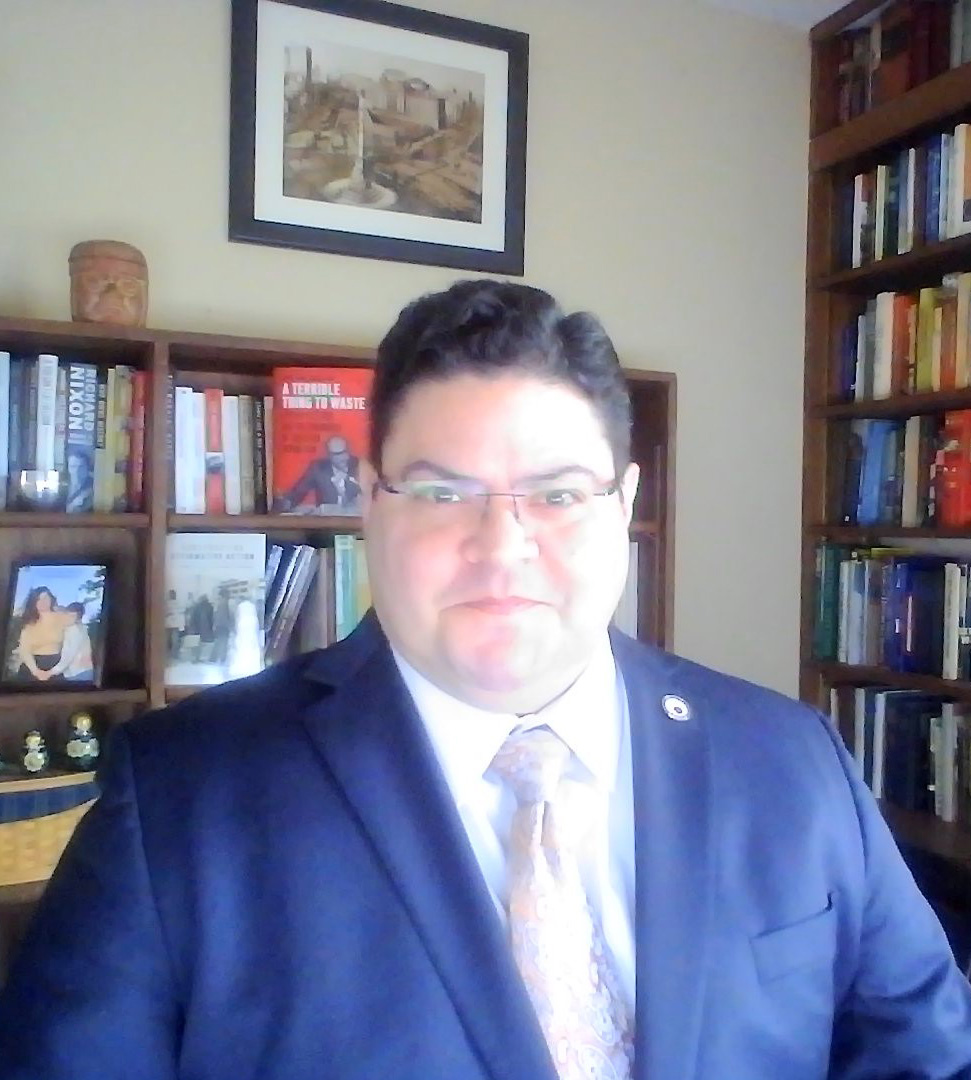
- Born: 1971 (age 54–55); New York, New York

Academic background
- Education: Baruch College (BA); University of Virginia (MA); CUNY Graduate Center (PhD)
- Doctoral advisor: Clarence Taylor

Academic work
- Discipline: History
- Institutions: City University of New York; Cooper Union; Governors State University; Monmouth University
- Website: www.davidgolland.com

David Hamilton Golland (born 1971) is an American historian of the 20th-century United States with a focus on the history of civil rights, public policy, politics, and labor. He serves as dean of the School of Humanities and Social Sciences and Professor of History at Monmouth University.

== Early life and education ==
Golland was born in 1971 in New York City and raised on Union Square in Manhattan. The son of a psychologist and professor of early childhood education, he was raised in a Reform Jewish household. He attended public schools in Manhattan, including Fiorello H. LaGuardia High School. He served in the United States Army during the Gulf War and was stationed at Fort Leonard Wood, Missouri and in Germany at Artillery Kaserne, Neckarsulm.

Golland received a baccalaureate degree in comparative American and European history at Baruch College, where he worked with Cynthia Whittaker, Carol Berkin, Catherine Clinton, Wendell Pritchett, Jane Clement Bond, and Myrna Chase. He took his master's degree in American history at the University of Virginia, studying with Michael Holt, Ed Ayers, and Gary Gallagher. He completed his MPhil and PhD in United States history (with a minor field in Latin American history) at the CUNY Graduate Center, working with Clarence Taylor, Carol Berkin, Joshua Freeman, Laird Bergad, and Martin Burke.

== Academic career ==
Golland's first book, Constructing Affirmative Action: The Struggle for Equal Employment Opportunity, was published by the University Press of Kentucky in 2011. Based on his doctoral dissertation, the book focused on the origins of affirmative action in the building construction trades. Positively reviewed in the American Historical Review and Journal of American History, among others, it was the subject of a panel discussion at the 40th Annual Conference of the National Association for Ethnic Studies in New Orleans, Louisiana, in 2012. Discussants included Catherine Clinton and David Colman.

Golland's second book, A Terrible Thing to Waste: Arthur Fletcher and the Conundrum of the Black Republican, was published in 2019 by the University Press of Kansas. This biography of "the most important civil rights leader you've (probably) never heard of" tells how, in the second half of the 20th century, the Republican Party gradually abandoned the civil rights principles it had long espoused. Positively reviewed in the Journal of American History and Journal of Southern History, among others, it was the 2020 iRead (freshman common read) at Washburn University.

Golland's third book, Livin' Just to Find Emotion: Journey and the Story of American Rock, with a foreword by Joel Selvin, was published in February 2024 by Rowman & Littlefield. The book received starred reviews from Publishers Weekly and Library Journal; was released as an audiobook by Tantor Media; and was excerpted at Salon.Com.

In addition to his books, Golland has published essays in Rock Music Studies, California History, Critical Issues in Justice and Politics, the Claremont Journal of Religion, Estudios Interdisciplinarios de America Latina y el Caribe, and Perspectives on History, and reviews in the American Historical Review, Journal of American History, Journal of Southern History, Journal of American Ethnic History, H-Net, and Labor History.

Golland has taught at Brooklyn College, Hunter College, the City College of New York, the College of Staten Island, Borough of Manhattan Community College, Bronx Community College, and the Cooper Union. He has also taught in the Albemarle County Public School District in Charlottesville, Virginia. In 2011 he was appointed to the faculty of Governors State University, where he was awarded tenure and promoted to associate professor in 2016, elected President of the Faculty Senate in 2017, and promoted to professor in 2020.

In 2022, Golland was appointed dean of the Wayne D. McMurray School of Humanities and Social Sciences at Monmouth University.

Golland served on the Committee on Research and Government of the Organization of American Historians from 2017 to 2020, as vice president of the Park Forest Historical Society from 2013 to 2017, and as treasurer of the National Association for Ethnic Studies from 2015 to 2016, where he also chaired the 2015 and 2016 national conferences at Mississippi State University and the University of Arizona, respectively.

== Personal life ==
Golland married in 2004. They have one daughter and one son.

== Bibliography ==
=== Books ===
- Constructing Affirmative Action: The Struggle for Equal Employment Opportunity (Lexington: University Press of Kentucky, 2011) ISBN 9780813129976
- A Terrible Thing to Waste: Arthur Fletcher and the Conundrum of the Black Republican (Lawrence: University Press of Kansas, 2019) ISBN 9780700627646
- Livin' Just to Find Emotion: Journey and the Story of American Rock (Rowman & Littlefield, 2024) ISBN 9781538187012

=== Essays ===
- "Recent Works on the Mexican Revolution," Estudios Interdisciplinarios de América Latina y el Caribe 16:1 (January–June 2005)
- "A Mind is a Terrible Thing to Waste: Arthur Fletcher, Religion, and the American Underclass," Claremont Journal of Religion 1:1 (January 2012); reprinted in Best of CJR 2012–2014 (July 2014)
- "From Black Kiss to Black Captain: Race, Gender, and A Half Century of Star Trek," Critical Issues in Justice and Politics 7:1 (Spring, 2014)
- "Poverty in a Sea of Wealth: Arthur Fletcher in California, 1959–1965," California History 91:2 (Summer, 2014)
- "Digitizing the Fletcher Papers: A Unique Historical Experience," Perspectives on History, April 2015
- "Don't Stop Believin': Journey, Race, and the Making of a Rock Legend," Rock Music Studies, October 2023
