= Samuel L. =

Samuel L. may refer to:

- Samuel L. Jackson (born 1948), American actor
- Samuel L. Clemens aka Mark Twain (1835–1910), American author
- Samuel L. Devine (1915–1997), American politician
- Samuel L. Gravely Jr. (1922–2004) African-American naval officer
- Samuel L. Greitzer (1905–1988), American mathematician
- Samuel L. Lewis (1896–1971) American mystic and horticulturalist
- Samuel L. Mitchill (1764–1831) American physician, naturalist, and politician
- Samuel L. Popkin (born 1942), American political scientist
- Samuel L. Southard (1787–1842), American statesman
