= The Geometry of Numbers =

Book on the geometry of numbers

The Geometry of Numbers is a book on the geometry of numbers, an area of mathematics in which the geometry of lattices, repeating sets of points in the plane or higher dimensions, is used to derive results in number theory. It was written by Carl D. Olds, Anneli Cahn Lax, and Giuliana Davidoff, and published by the Mathematical Association of America in 2000 as volume 41 of their Anneli Lax New Mathematical Library book series.

== Authorship and publication history ==
The Geometry of Numbers is based on a book manuscript that Carl D. Olds, a New Zealand-born mathematician working in California at San Jose State University, was still writing when he died in 1979. Anneli Cahn Lax, the editor of the New Mathematical Library of the Mathematical Association of America, took up the task of editing it, but it remained unfinished when she died in 1999. Finally, Giuliana Davidoff took over the project, and saw it through to publication in 2000.

== Topics ==
The Geometry of Numbers is relatively short, and is divided into two parts. The first part applies number theory to the geometry of lattices, and the second applies results on lattices to number theory. Topics in the first part include the relation between the maximum distance between parallel lines that are not separated by any point of a lattice and the slope of the lines, Pick's theorem relating the area of a lattice polygon to the number of lattice points it contains, and the Gauss circle problem of counting lattice points in a circle centered at the origin of the plane.

The second part begins with Minkowski's theorem, that centrally symmetric convex sets of large enough area (or volume in higher dimensions) necessarily contain a nonzero lattice point. It applies this to Diophantine approximation, the problem of accurately approximating one or more irrational numbers by rational numbers. After another chapter on the linear transformations of lattices, the book studies the problem of finding the smallest nonzero values of quadratic forms, and Lagrange's four-square theorem, the theorem that every non-negative integer can be represented as a sum of four squares of integers. The final two chapters concern Blichfeldt's theorem, that bounded planar regions with area $A$ can be translated to cover at least $\lceil A\rceil$ lattice points, and additional results in Diophantine approximation. The chapters on Minkowski's theorem and Blichfeldt's theorem, particularly, have been called the "foundation stones" of the book by reviewer Philip J. Davis.

An appendix by Peter Lax concerns the Gaussian integers. A second appendix concerns lattice-based methods for packing problems including circle packing and, in higher dimensions, sphere packing. The book closes with biographies of Hermann Minkowski and Hans Frederick Blichfeldt.

== Audience and reception ==
The Geometry of Numbers is intended for secondary-school and undergraduate mathematics students, although it may be too advanced for the secondary-school students; it contains exercises making it suitable for classroom use. It has been described as "expository", "self-contained", and "readable".

However, reviewer Henry Cohn notes several copyediting oversights, complains about its selection of topics, in which "curiosities are placed on an equal footing with deep results", and misses certain well-known examples which were not included. Despite this, he recommends the book to readers who are not yet ready for more advanced treatments of this material and wish to see "some beautiful mathematics".
