= Elena Marchisotto =

American mathematician (born 1945)

Elena Anne Corie Marchisotto (born 1945) is a mathematician, mathematics educator, and historian of mathematics. She is a professor emeritus of mathematics at California State University, Northridge.

== Education and career ==
Marchisotto graduated from Manhattanville College of the Sacred Heart in 1967 and earned a master's degree from California State University, Northridge in 1977. She completed a Ph.D. in 1990 from New York University. Her dissertation, The contributions of Mario Pieri to mathematics and mathematics education, was jointly supervised by Kenneth P. Goldberg and Anneli Cahn Lax.

She joined the California State University, Northridge faculty in 1983.. At Northridge, she also created and directed a developmental mathematics program, designed to train graduate students as teachers. This developmental program earned the Noel Levitz Center National Conference on Student Retention, New Orleans: Award for Outstanding Mathematics Program in 1993.

== Writing ==
In 1995, Marchisotto became a co-author of a study edition of The Mathematical Experience (a book originally published in 1981 by Reuben Hersh and Philip J. Davis), after having read the book and used it for her teaching from the early 1980s.. The second edition of the book was published in 2012 and includes Epilogues written by the authors.

She also co-authored an English translation of a history of mathematics by Umberto Bottazzini, Hilbert's Flute: The History of Modern Mathematics (with Bottazzini and Patricia Miller, Springer, 2016).

Marchisotto has written extensively about Mario Pieri:

- "H.S.M. Coxeter’s Theory of Accessibility: From Mario Pieri to Marvin Greenberg", (2022) in Results in Mathematics Special issue in memory of Heinrich Wefelscheid 77:187 doi:10.1007/s00025-022-01690-9
- The Legacy of Mario Pieri on the Foundations and Philosophy of Mathematics, with F. Rodriguez-Consuegra & J. T. Smith, (Birkhäuser, 2021)
- "Mario Pieri’s View of the Symbiotic Relationship between the Foundations and the Teaching of Elementary Geometry in the Context of the Early Twentieth Century Proposals for Pedagogical Reform", (2021) in Philosophia Scientiae 25(1), with A. Millán Gascia.
- "Mario Pieri: the man, the mathematician, the teacher", (2010) in La Matematica nella Società e nella Cultura Rivista dell'Unione Matematica Italiana 3(3).
- The Legacy of Mario Pieri in geometry and arithmetic, with J. T. Smith, (Birkhäuser, 2007)

Marchisotto's philosophy of teaching can be described as "humanistic" Her publications on this philosophy include:

- "The Human Face of Mathematics: Reuben Hersh (1927-2020) In Memoriam." In Journal of Humanistic Mathematics 10(2) (July 2020)/ https://scholarship.claremont.edu/jhm/vol10/iss2/25
- "A case study in Hersh’s Philosophy: Bézout’s Theorem." In Humanizing Mathematics and its Philosophy: Essays Celebrating the 90th Birthday of Reuben Hersh edited by Bharath Sriraman (Birkhäuser, 2017)
- "Teaching mathematics humanistically: A new look at an old friend'. In Essays in Humanistic Mathematics (MAA Notes Series, 1993).

=== Textbooks ===
- 1987: Topics in Intermediate Algebra (Wiley)
- 1987: Developmental Mathematics: Arithmetic, Algebra, and Measurement Geometry (Wiley)
- 2003: Mathematics for High School Teachers: An Advanced Perspective (with Zalman Usiskin, Anthony Peressini, and Dick Stanley, Prentice Hall)
