= Giuliana Davidoff =

American mathematician

Giuliana P. Davidoff is an American mathematician specializing in number theory and expander graphs. She is the Robert L. Rooke Professor of Mathematics and the chair of mathematics and statistics at Mount Holyoke College.

== Education and career ==
Davidoff is a graduate of Rollins College. She completed her Ph.D. in 1984 at New York University, with Peter Sarnak as her doctoral advisor; her dissertation was Statistical Properties of Certain Exponential Sums.

== Books ==
Davidoff is a coauthor of:

- Elementary Number Theory, Group Theory and Ramanujan Graphs (with Peter Sarnak and Alain Valette, 2003)
- The Geometry of Numbers (with Carl D. Olds and Anneli Cahn Lax, 2001)
- Laboratories in Mathematical Experimentation: A Bridge to Higher Mathematics (1997)
