= Gustavus Myers Outstanding Book Award =

The Gustavus Myers Outstanding Book Awards were literary awards given out each year between 1985 and 2008 by the Gustavus Myers Center for the Study of Bigotry and Human Rights. (Both the awards and the center sometimes had different variations on their names.) Each year ten works were so noted for their treatment of the subjects of bigotry, intolerance, and inequitable power arrangements in society.

== Purpose and history ==
The purpose of the awards was initially described as being "an annual award for the best scholarship published on the subject of intolerance in the U.S." This definition was later stated as being for the purpose of "commend[ing] works published in a given year which extend our understanding of the root causes of bigotry and the range of options we as humans have in constructing alternative ways to share power." Each year, ten books were selected to win the award. In some years a list of honorable mentions was also announced.

The center was founded in 1984, but the first awards do not appear to have been given until 1985. Awards were announced on December 10 of each year, to coincide with Human Rights Day. Nominations were solicited, or winners announced, in academic journals such as Women's Studies Quarterly, Hypatia, NWSA Journal, The Radical Teacher, and others. Reviewers were formed on a selection committee to read and report on nominated works. One newspaper columnist who acted as a reviewer reported that he was given a list of books to pick two from, which once received he was to write a one-page review of each. It is not clear what the funding sources were for either the center or its awards process.

The awards received significant visibility, with many authors including having received one in their biographies. In the final year they were given, the books that received awards were said to have been selected from a field of nearly 400 nominations. Recipients of the award include Toni Cade Bambara, Paula Giddings, Joy Harjo, Joe L. Kincheloe, Walter LaFeber, Ruben Martinez, Nell Irvin Painter, Steven Salaita, Shirley R. Steinberg, Clarence Taylor, Harriet A. Washington and Kenji Yoshino.

The awards ceased when the center closed in 2009 due to a lack of funds.

== See also ==
- List of history awards
- Gustavus Myers
- Gustavus Myers Center for the Study of Bigotry and Human Rights
