= Nicholas D. Kazarinoff =

American mathematician (1929–1991)

Nicholas Donat Kazarinoff (August 12, 1929, Ann Arbor, Michigan – November 21, 1991, Albuquerque, New Mexico) was an American mathematician, specializing in differential equations. In 1988 he was elected a Fellow of the American Association for the Advancement of Science (AAAS).

== Education and career ==
Kazarinoff grew up in Ann Arbor, Michigan, and went to college in his hometown at the University of Michigan. There he graduated with a B.S. in 1950 and an M.S. in 1951. He graduated in 1954 with a Ph.D. in mathematics from the University of Wisconsin–Madison. His Ph.D. thesis Asymptotic Forms for the Whitaker Functions of Large Complex Order m was supervised by Rudolf Ernest Langer. In the mathematics department of Purdue University, Kazarinoff was from 1953 to 1955 an instructor and from 1955 to 1956 an assistant professor. At the University of Michigan, he was from 1956 to 1960 an assistant professor, from 1960 to 1964 an associate professor, and from 1964 to 1971 a full professor. In 1971 he resigned from the University of Michigan to become the chair of the mathematics department at the University of Buffalo (also known as SUNY Buffalo or the State University of New York, Buffalo). There he was the Martin Professor of Mathematics from 1972 until his death in 1991. He died in Albuquerque when he was a visiting professor at the University of New Mexico, where he was also a visiting professor in 1985. He also held visiting appointments at the University of Wisconsin–Madison's Army Mathematics Research Center (AMRC) (1958–1960), at Rome's Consiglio Nazionale delle Ricerche, CNR (1978 and 1980), and at Beijing University of Technology (1987). At Moscow's Steklov Institute of Mathematics, he was an exchange professor for the academic year 1960–1961 and again in the spring semester of 1965.

Kazarinoff's research focused mainly on differential equations. His speciality was partial differential equations applied to reaction-diffusion systems. His research on differential equations included fluid dynamics and dynamical systems. He also did research on the geometry of convex sets, the geometry of theta series, and iteration of real-valued and complex-valued maps. He was the author or co-author of more than 80 research articles and monographs. After his death, the University of Michigan established the Nicholas D. Kazarinoff Collegiate Professorship of Complex Systems, Mathematics, and Physics.

== D. K. Kazarinoff's inequality for tetrahedra ==
Kazarinoff dedicated his book Geometric Analysis to his father, Donat Konstantinovich Kazarinoff (1892–1957), who taught mathematics and engineering at the University of Michigan for 35 years (with 37 years of affiliation and 2 years of academic leave).

Theorem: Let Ⲧ be a tetrahedron and let P be a point belonging to T. Let the distances from P to the vertices and to the faces of Ⲧ be denoted by R_{i} and r_{i}, respectively, for i = 1,2,3,4. Then:
For any tetrahedron Ⲧ whose circumcenter is not an exterior point,
ΣR_{i}/Σr_{i} > 2√2 and 2√2 is the greatest lower bound.

According to László Fejes Tóth, D. K. Kazarinoff stated the inequality but never published his proof, perhaps because he thought that his proof was not simple enough. However, shortly before his death, D. K. Kazarinoff provided a simple proof of the Erdős-Mordell inequality for triangles and gave a generalization to three dimensions. Nicholas D. Kazarinoff used the work of his father as a basis for a proof of D. K. Kazarinoff's inequality for tetrahedra.

== Personal life ==
In July 1948, Kazarinoff married Margaret Louise Koning. They had five sons and a daughter. Upon his death in 1991 at age 62, he was survived by his widow, their six children, and eight grandchildren. He was an active member of the Unitarian Universalist Church of Buffalo and served on the church's finance committee.

== Selected publications ==
=== Articles ===
- Kazarinoff, N. D.; McKelvey, R. (1956). "Asymptotic Solution of Differential Equations in a Domain Containing a Regular Singular Point". Canadian Journal of Mathematics. 8: 97–104. doi:10.4153/CJM-1956-015-6.
- Kazarinoff, Nicholas D. (1958). "Asymptotic theory of second order differential equations with two simple turning points". Archive for Rational Mechanics and Analysis. 2 (1): 129. Bibcode:1958ArRMA...2..129K. doi:10.1007/BF00277924. hdl:2027.42/46172. S2CID 122635444.
- Kazarinoff, Nicholas D.; Ritt, Robert K. (March 1959). "On the theory of scalar diffusion and its application to the prolate spheroid". Annals of Physics. doi:10.1016/0003-4916(59)90083-1. hdl:2027.42/32464?show=full.
- Goodrich, R. F.; Kazarinoff, N. D.; Clemmow, P. C. (1963). "Scalar diffraction by prolate spheroids whose eccentricities are almost one". Mathematical Proceedings of the Cambridge Philosophical Society. 59 (1): 167–183. Bibcode:1963PCPS...59..167G. doi:10.1017/S0305004100002127. S2CID 123273330.
- Kazarinoff, N. D. (1968). "On who first proved the impossibility of constructing certain regular polygons with ruler and compass alone". The American Mathematical Monthly. 75 (6): 647. doi:10.1080/00029890.1968.11971041.
- Rogak, E. D.; Kazarinoff, N. D.; Scott-Thomas, J. F. (1970). "Sufficient conditions for bang-bang control in Hilbert space". Journal of Optimization Theory and Applications. 5: 1–11. doi:10.1007/BF00928120. hdl:2027.42/45225. S2CID 119962756.
- Bloom, Clifford O.; Kazarinoff, Nicholas D. (1973). "Energy decays locally even if total energy grows algebraically with time" (PDF). Bulletin of the American Mathematical Society. 79 (5): 969–972. doi:10.1090/S0002-9904-1973-13282-3.
- Kazarinoff, N.D. (1974). "Oscillations in Biochemistry". In van den Driessche, P. (ed.). Mathematical Problems in Biology. Lecture Notes in Biomathematics, volume 2. Vol. 2. Berlin; Heidelberg: Springer. pp. 132–138. doi:10.1007/978-3-642-45455-4_15. ISBN 978-3-540-06847-1.
- Hsü, In-Ding; Kazarinoff, Nicholas D. (1977). "Existence and stability of periodic solutions of a third-order non-linear autonomous system simulating immune response in animals". Proceedings of the Royal Society of Edinburgh, Section A. 77 (1–2): 163–175. doi:10.1017/S0308210500018126. S2CID 124834863.
- Kazarinoff, N. D.; Wan, Y.-H; Van den Driessche, P. (1978). "Hopf Bifurcation and Stability of Periodic Solutions of Differential-difference and Integro-differential Equations". IMA Journal of Applied Mathematics. 21 (4): 461–477. doi:10.1093/imamat/21.4.461.
- Kazarinoff, Nicholas D.; Van den Driessche, Pauline (1979). "Control of Oscillations in Hematopoiesis". Science. 203 (4387): 1348–1349. Bibcode:1979Sci...203.1348K. doi:10.1126/science.284587. PMID 284587.
- Kazarinoff, Nicholas D.; Seydel, Rüdiger (1986). "Bifurcations in Lorenz's symmetric fourth-order system". Physical Review A. 34 (4): 3387–3392. Bibcode:1986PhRvA..34.3387K. doi:10.1103/PhysRevA.34.3387. PMID 9897657.
- Coutsias, Evangelos A.; Kazarinoff, Nicholas D. (1987). "Disorder, renormalizability, theta functions and Cornu spirals". Physica D: Nonlinear Phenomena. 26 (1–3): 295–310. Bibcode:1987PhyD...26..295C. doi:10.1016/0167-2789(87)90230-2.
- Kazarinoff, Nicholas D.; Wilkowski, Joseph S. (1989). "A numerical study of Marangoni flows in zone-refined silicon crystals". Physics of Fluids A: Fluid Dynamics. 1 (4): 625–627. Bibcode:1989PhFlA...1..625K. doi:10.1063/1.857434.
- Kazarinoff, Nicholas D.; Wilkowski, Joseph S. (1990). "Bifurcations of numerically simulated thermocapillary flows in axially symmetric float zones". Physics of Fluids A: Fluid Dynamics. 2 (10): 1797–1807. Bibcode:1990PhFlA...2.1797K. doi:10.1063/1.857706.
- Kazarinoff, Nicholas D.; Vincent, Xiaosong Liu (1992). "An Example of Instability for the Navier–Stokes Equations on the 2–dimensional Torus". Communications in Partial Differential Equations. 17 (11–12): 1995–2012. doi:10.1080/03605309208820911.

=== Books ===
- Kazarinoff, Nicholas D. (1961). Analytic inequalities. New York: Holt, Rinehart and Winston. 2003 pbk reprint. Dover Publications. 15 October 2014. ISBN 978-0486432441.
  - Kazarinoff, Nicholas D. (15 October 2014). Analytic Inequalities. Mineola, New York: Dover Publications. ISBN 978-0-486-43244-1.
- Kazarinoff, Nicholas D. (1961). Geometric Inequalities. Anneli Lax New Mathematical Library, 4. Mathematical Association of America. Kazarinoff, Nicholas D. (1961). 1975 pbk edition. Random House. ISBN 9780883856048.
- Kazarinoff, N. D. (1970). Ruler and the round; or, Angle trisection and circle division. Boston: Prindle, Weber & Schmidt.
  - Kazarinoff, Nicholas D. (January 2003). Ruler and the Round: Classic Problems in Geometric Constructions. Courier Corporation. ISBN 978-0-486-42515-3.
- Bloom, Clifford O.; Kazarinoff, Nicholas D. (1976). Short wave radiation problems in inhomogeneous media: asymptotic solutions. Lecture Notes in Mathematics, 522. Berlin; New York: Springer-Verlag. ISBN 0387076980. LCCN 76017818.
- Hassard, Brian D.; Kazarinoff, N. D.; Wan, Yieh-Hei (1981). Theory and applications of Hopf bifurcation. London Mathematical Society Lecture Notes, 41. Cambridge, UK: Cambridge University Press. ISBN 0521231582. LCCN 80049691.
  - Hassard, B. D.; Kazarinoff, N. D.; Wan, Yieh-Hei (27 February 1981). Theory and Applications of Hopf Bifurcation. CUP Archive. ISBN 978-0-521-23158-9.
