= Gustavus Myers Center for the Study of Bigotry and Human Rights =

U.S. nonprofit organization

Gustavus Myers Center
- Founded: 1984; 42 years ago
- Founder: James R. Bennett
- Dissolved: 2009; 17 years ago
- Type: Nonprofit
- Purpose: Intolerance and the sharing of power
- Location(s): Fayetteville, Arkansas, U.S. Boston, Massachusetts, U.S.
- Method: Book awards
- Key people: James R. Bennett, director Loretta Janice Williams, director
- Website: www.myerscenter.org (defunct)

The Gustavus Myers Center for the Study of Bigotry and Human Rights, earlier known as the Gustavus Myers Center for Human Rights or The Gustavus Myers Center for the Study of Human Rights in North America or several other such variations, was an American nonprofit organization that existed from 1984 to 2009. It took its name from American journalist and historian Gustavus Myers and, in particular, from his 1943 work History of Bigotry in the United States. The center was most known for the Gustavus Myers Outstanding Book Award, given out each year to ten books. The award, in the words of the center, "commends works published in a given year which extend our understanding of the root causes of bigotry and the range of options we as humans have in constructing alternative ways to share power."

== History ==
The initial director of the center, and founder of the book awards, was James R. Bennett (b. 1932), a professor of English at the University of Arkansas. Under his leadership, the center was located in the English Department of the university in Fayetteville, Arkansas. Under Bennett, "The specific purpose of the Center is to present an annual award for the best scholarship published on the subject of intolerance in the U.S." Bennett's own perspective included concern for the effects of what he called "the patriarchal-corporate-government-education-media complex [which makes use of] a massive propaganda system designed to produce uncritical support." Bennett remained the center's director in early 1998.

Later in 1998, he was succeeded by Loretta Janice Williams (1937–2015), an author, sociologist, and activist, who became the center's other longtime director. The center moved to Boston, Massachusetts, first at the Boston University School of Social Work, and then from 2002 on, at Simmons College. Under Williams, the Myers Center continued to give out annual awards for books which are "outstanding in helping shed light on bigotry in America." It additionally published a 12-to-16-page newsletter, beginning in 2000, that after a few issues was called Multidiversity and that contained commentary on current topics as well as book reviews. The Harvard Graduate School of Education characterized the center as "promot[ing] living out diversity equitably."

Under either director, it is not clear how many people were affiliated with the center or the precise source of its funding. In later years the center's website published a list of "sponsors", without indicating their precise roles. In 2005, the sponsors included the American Friends Service Committee, Fellowship of Reconciliation, National Association for the Advancement of Colored People, National Conference for Community and Justice, National Urban League, PFLAG, Political Research Associates, Unitarian Universalist Association, and United Church of Christ's Justice and Witness Ministries. For 2007, the center took over from the radical house Autonomedia the publishing of the Fred Ho–created "Sheroes Womyn Warriors Wall Calendar". Proceeds from sales went to the center, and an item in the Boston Globe saying such recommended purchase of the calendar (which featured the likes of Anna Louise Strong and Lillian Masediba Ngoyi) as a better alternative to typical calendar subjects.

The book awards received significant visibility, with many authors including their having received one in their biographies. In the final year they were given, the 10 books that received awards were said to have been selected from a field of nearly 400 nominations.

In 2009, the year of the Myers Center's 25th anniversary, the center closed due to lack of funds, in doing so saying, "Like so many other nonprofits, we experienced insurmountable difficulties in garnering funding to continue our important work."
