= Carl D. Olds =

New Zealand-born American mathematician

Carl Douglas Olds (11 May 1912 – 11 November 1979) was a New Zealand-born American mathematician specializing in number theory.

== Biography ==
Carl Olds was born in 1912 in Wanganui, New Zealand. He was an undergraduate student at Stanford University, and continued at Stanford as a graduate student, defending his PhD thesis On the Number of Representations of the Square of an Integer as the Sum of an Odd Number of Squares at Stanford University in 1943 under the supervision of James V. Uspensky.

From 1935 to 1940 and in the summer of 1942, he was an acting instructor at Stanford University and from 1940 to 1945, an assistant professor at Purdue University. From 1945 until his retirement, Olds was based at California State University, San Jose, where he advanced through the ranks to full professor. He died on 11 November 1979 in Santa Clara, California.

== Recognition ==
Olds was awarded the 1973 Chauvenet Prize for his paper "The Simple Continued Fraction Expansion of e", published in the American Mathematical Monthly in 1970.

== Works ==
=== Books ===
- Olds, Carl D.; Lax, Anelli; Davidoff, Giuliana P. (2000), The Geometry of Numbers, Mathematical Association of America, doi:10.5948/UPO9780883859551, ISBN 9780883856437
- Olds, Carl D. (1992) [1963], Continued Fractions, Anneli Lax New Mathematical Library, vol. 9, Mathematical Association of America, doi:10.5948/UPO9780883859261, ISBN 9780883856093

=== Articles ===
- Olds, Carl D. The Simple Continued Fraction Expansion of e , The American Mathematical Monthly, Vol. 77, No. 9 (Nov. 1970), pp. 968–974. (URL, PDF)
- Olds, Carl D. The Best Polynomial Approximation of Functions, The American Mathematical Monthly, Vol. 57, No. 9 (Nov. 1950), pp. 617–621. (URL)
- Olds, Carl D. Note on an asymmetric diophantine approximation, Bull. Amer. Math. Soc. 52 (1946), pp. 261–263. (URL)
- Olds, Carl D. On the representations, N_{3}(n^{2}), Bull. Amer. Math. Soc. Volume 47, Number 6 (1941), pp. 499–503. (URL)
