= Results in Mathematics =

- Discipline: Mathematics
- Language: English
- Edited by: Catalin Badea

Publication details
- History: 1978-present
- Publisher: Birkhäuser
- Frequency: 8/year
- Impact factor: 2.214 (2021)

Standard abbreviations
- ISO 4: Results Math.

Indexing
- ISSN: 1422-6383 (print); 1420-9012 (web)
- LCCN: 2007204710
- OCLC no.: 609909072

Links
- Journal homepage; Online access

Results in Mathematics/Resultate der Mathematik is a peer-reviewed scientific journal that covers all aspects of pure and applied mathematics and is published by Birkhäuser. It was established in 1978 and the editor-in-chief is Catalin Badea (University of Lille).

== Abstracting and indexing ==
This journal is abstracted and indexed by:

- Science Citation Index Expanded
- Mathematical Reviews
- Scopus
- Zentralblatt Math
- Academic OneFile
- Current Contents/Physical, Chemical and Earth Sciences
- Mathematical Reviews

According to the Journal Citation Reports, the journal has a 2013 impact factor of 0.642.
