= Walter Warwick Sawyer =

Mathematician, author, and educator

Walter Warwick Sawyer (or W. W. Sawyer; April 5, 1911 – February 15, 2008) was a mathematician, mathematics educator and author, who taught on several continents.

== Life and career ==
Walter Warwick Sawyer was born in St. Ives, Hunts, England on April 5, 1911. He attended Highgate School in London. He was an undergraduate at St. John's College, Cambridge, obtaining a BA in 1933 and specializing in quantum theory and relativity. He was an assistant lecturer in mathematics from 1933 to 1937 at University College, Dundee and from 1937 to 1944 at University of Manchester. In 1940 he met Betty [Hilda Elizabeth Crowther] and within two weeks, they were married. In 1943 their one child, daughter Anne Elizabeth, was born. 1943 was also the year that Sawyer's publishing career began with the book Mathematician's Delight published by Pelican Books, the non-fiction imprint of Penguin Books founded by Allen Lane and V. K. Krishna Menon. From 1945 to 1947, he was the head of mathematics at Leicester College of Technology.

In 1948 Sawyer became the first head of the mathematics department of what is now the University of Ghana. From 1951 to 1956, he was at Canterbury College (now the University of Canterbury in New Zealand). He left Canterbury College to become an associate professor at the University of Illinois, where he worked from winter 1957 through June 1958. While there, he criticized the New Math movement, which included criticism of the people who had hired him. From 1958 to 1965, he was a professor of mathematics at Wesleyan University, where he edited Mathematics Student Journal. In the fall of 1965 he became a professor at the University of Toronto, appointed to both the College of Education and the Department of Mathematics. He retired in 1976.

Sawyer was the author of 11 books. He is probably best known for his semi-popular works Mathematician's Delight and Prelude to Mathematics. Both of these have been translated into many languages. Mathematician's Delight was still in print 65 years after it was written. Some mathematicians have credited these books with helping to inspire their choice of a career.

Sawyer died on February 15, 2008, at the age of 96. He is survived by a daughter, Anne León (Artist) and granddaughter, Anita León (Educator).

== Partial bibliography ==
- Mathematician's Delight, (Penguin, 1943), is probably his best known book.
- Mathematics in Theory and Practice, (Odhams, 1952)
- Prelude to Mathematics (Penguin, 1955)
- Designing and Making, (Blackwell, 1957)
- A Concrete Approach to Abstract Algebra, (Freeman, 1959)
- What Is Calculus About?, (Yale University, 1961)
- Vision in Elementary Mathematics, (Penguin, 1964)
- A Path to Modern Mathematics, (Penguin, 1966)
- Search for Pattern, (Penguin, 1970)
- An Engineering Approach to Linear Algebra, (Cambridge University Press, 1972)
- A First Look at Numerical Functional Analysis, (Oxford University Press, 1978)
