= Clarence Taylor =

American historian

Clarence Taylor Professor Emeritus
- Awards: Gustavus Myers Award

Academic background
- Education: Brooklyn College (BA), New York University (MA), City University of New York (PhD)
- Thesis: The Black Churches of Brooklyn from the 19th Century to the Civil Rights Era (1992)
- Doctoral advisor: David Rosner

Academic work
- Discipline: History
- Institutions: Le Moyne College (1991-1996); Florida International University (1996-2004); Baruch College and the Graduate Center, City University of New York (2004-)
- Doctoral students: David Hamilton Golland

Clarence Taylor is professor emeritus of history at Baruch College in New York City and author of books on racism, religion, and civil rights in 20th-century America.

== Background ==
Clarence Taylor was born in Brooklyn, New York. He attended the East New York elementary school and Canarsie High School in Brooklyn. He received a BA from Brooklyn College and MA from New York University. In 1992, he received a doctorate in American history from the Graduate Center of the City University of New York.

== Career ==
Taylor began his career as a teacher in the New York city public school system. He spent eight years as special education teacher at Junior High School 278 at Marine Park (Brooklyn). He then became a social studies teacher at James Madison High School.

In 1991, Taylor became a professor at Le Moyne College in Syracuse, New York. In 1996, he joined the history department and African-New World Studies Program at Florida International University. In 2004 he was named Professor of History and Chair of the Department of Black and Latino Studies at Baruch College. In 2017 he became Professor emeritus.

Taylor researches recent civil rights and black power movements, African-American religion, and the modern history of New York City.

In 2012, Taylor appeared in the documentary film Changing Faces of Harlem.

In 2018, Taylor appeared in the PBS documentary film "The Woman in the Iron Coffin"

== Awards ==
- 2001: Gustavus Myers Award (for Civil Rights Since 1787)

== Works ==
Taylor has written and edited books and also articles for journals and magazines including Jacobin.

Books:

- The Black Churches of Brooklyn from the 19th Century to the Civil Rights Era (1994)
- Knocking At Our Own Door: Milton A. Galamison and the Struggle to Integrate New York City Schools (1997)
- Black Religious Intellectuals: The Fight for Equality from Jim Crow to the 21st Century (2002)
- Reds at the Blackboard: Communism, Civil Rights and the New York City Teachers Union (2011)
- Fight the Power: African Americans and the Long History of Police Brutality in New York City (2018)

Books edited:

- Civil Rights Since 1787: A Reader in the Black Struggle (2000) (co-editor)
- Civil Rights in New York City: From World War II to the Giuliani Era (2011)

== See also ==
- Teachers Union
- James Madison High School (Brooklyn)

== External sources ==
- C-SPAN
- New York Historical Society
