= Cynthia Whittaker =

American academic and author (1941–2023)

Cynthia Hyla Whittaker (May 15, 1941 – October 11, 2023) was an American academic and author. As a historian, she specialized in the history of Eastern Europe, especially the Russian Empire and of the Soviet Union. She built her career while teaching courses in the subject at Baruch College.

== Biography ==
=== Early life ===
Cynthia Hyla Whittaker was born on May 15, 1941. She received an undergraduate degree from Marymount College in Tarrytown, New York in 1962. She received advanced degrees in Russian history and literature from Indiana University at Bloomington.

=== Career ===
Whittaker taught courses in Eastern European history at both the undergraduate and graduate levels at Baruch College since 1984, and for a time served as Chair of the History Department there. Whittaker was a Fulbright Scholar and received research grants from—among others—the Harriman and Kennan Institutes, as well as the Rockefeller Foundation.

From 1999 to 2000 she was a visiting fellow at the Slavic Research Center of Hokkaido University in Japan. From October 2003 to May 2004 she co-curated a museum exhibit entitled Russia Engages the World, 1453-1825 at the New York Public Library.

=== Death ===
Cynthia Whittaker died in New York City on October 11, 2023, at the age of 82.

== Bibliography ==
=== Books ===
- Origins of Modern Russian Education: An Intellectual Biography of Count Sergei Uvarov. Northern Illinois University Press. 1984. ISBN 978-0875801001. Archived from the original on July 4, 2013.
  - Translated into Russian as Graf Sergej Semenovič Uvarov i ego vremja. Sankt-Peterburg: Gumanitarnoe Agentstvo "Akademičeskij Proėkt", 1999.
  - Reviewed in American Historical Review, Canadian Slavonic Papers, Jahrbücher für Geschichte Osteuropas, Slavic Review, Russian Review and History of Education Quarterly.
- Russian Monarchy: Eighteenth-Century Rulers and Writers in Political Dialogue. Northern Illinois University Press. 2003. ISBN 9780875803081.
  - Reviewed in Slavic and East European journal, Russian Review, American historical review, Canadian-American Slavic studies, Slavic review and Groniek.
- Russia Engages the World, 1453-1825. Harvard University Press. 2003. ISBN 9780674012783.
  - Reviewed in: Slavic and East European journal', Solanus, European History Quarterly and Jahrbücher für Geschichte Osteuropas.
- Visualizing Russia: Fedor Solntsev and Crafting a National Past (Russian History and Culture). Brill Academic Publishers, Inc. 2010. ISBN 9789004183438.

=== Journal articles ===
- Whittaker, Cynthia H. (Spring 1992). "The Reforming Tsar: The Redefinition of Autocratic Duty in Eighteenth- Century Russia". Slavic Review. 51 (1): 77–98. doi:10.2307/2500262. JSTOR 2500262. S2CID 155419888.
- Whittaker, Cynthia H.; Riasanovsky, Nicholas V. (Summer 1980). "Government and Elite in 19th Century Russia". History of Education Quarterly. 20 (2): 233–40. doi:10.2307/367917. JSTOR 367917. S2CID 147521928.
- Whittaker, Cynthia H. (1978). "From Promise to Purge: The First Years of St. Petersburg University". Paedagogica Historica. 18 (1): 148–167. doi:10.1080/0030923780180107.
- Whittaker, Cynthia H. (April 1978). "The Ideology of Sergei Uvarov: An Interpretive Essay". Russian Review. 37 (2): 158–176. doi:10.2307/128466. JSTOR 128466.
- Whittaker, Cynthia H. (1978). "The Impact of the Oriental Renaissance in Russia: The Case of Sergej Uvarov". Jahrbücher für Geschichte Osteuropas. 26 (4): 503–524. JSTOR 41045828.
- Whittaker, Cynthia H. (June 1976). "The Women's Movement during the Reign of Alexander II: A Case Study in Russian Liberalism". Journal of Modern History. 48 (2): 35–69. doi:10.1086/241523. JSTOR 1877817. S2CID 143149626.

Whittaker was working on an intellectual biography of Catherine the Great.
