= V. Parmeswaran Nair =

V. Parameswaran Nair is a physicist, currently a distinguished professor at City College of New York, holding it since September 2011, and is also a published author.

== Early life and education ==
Nair received a bachelor's degree in 1976 and a master's degree in 1978 at the University of Kerala in India. He also received a doctorate in 1983 at Syracuse University in New York.
