= Theodore Raphan =

American computer scientist

Theodore Raphan is an American neuroscientist. He is Broeklundian Distinguished Professor of Computer and Information Science at Brooklyn College, City University of New York. and also a published author.
