= Alexander Gamburd =

American mathematician

- Citizenship: United States
- Education: Massachusetts Institute of Technology (B.S.); Princeton University (M.A., Ph.D.)
- Known for: Arithmetic combinatorics
- Awards: Presidential Early Career Award; Alfred P. Sloan Fellow; NSF CAREER Award
- Scientific career
- Fields: Mathematics
- Workplaces: CUNY Graduate Center
- Thesis: "On Spectral Gap for Infinite Index "Congruence" Subgroups of SL(sub 2)(Z)" (1999)
- Doctoral advisor: Peter Sarnak

Alexander Gamburd is a mathematician at the Graduate Center of the City University of New York known for his work in spectral problems in number theory, probability, and Arithmetic combinatorics. He is a Presidential Professor of Mathematics at the CUNY Graduate Center.

== Life and career ==
Gamburd earned his B.S degree in mathematics from the Massachusetts Institute of Technology in 1993. He received his M.A. (1994) and Ph.D. (1999) from Princeton University, where his advisor was Peter Sarnak. In 2004, Gamburd became assistant professor of mathematics at the University of California, Santa Cruz and was promoted to full professor in 2008. He was a visiting scholar at the Institute for Advanced Study from 2005 to 2006 and from 2007 to 2008. In 2011, Gamburd joined the faculty of the CUNY Graduate Center as Presidential Professor of Mathematics.

== Awards and honors ==
- In 2007, Gamburd received a Sloan Research Fellowship.
- In 2007, he received an NSF CAREER Award.
- In 2008, he won a Presidential Early Career Award.

== Selected publications ==
- Bourgain, Jean; Gamburd, Alexander. "Uniform expansion bounds for Cayley graphs of SL_{2}(F_{p})". Annals of Mathematics 167 (2008), pages 625-642. MR 2415383
- Breuillard, Emmanuel; Gamburd, Alexander. "Strong uniform expansion in SL(2, p)". Geometric and Functional Analysis 20 (2010), number 5, pages 1201-1209. MR 2746951
- Bourgain, Jean; Gamburd, Alexander; Sarnak, Peter. "Generalization of Selberg's 3/16 theorem and affine sieve". Acta Mathematica 207 (2011), number 2, pages 255–290. MR 2892611
- Bourgain, Jean; Gamburd, Alexander; Sarnak, Peter. "Markoff triples and strong approximation". Comptes Rendus Mathématique. Académie des Sciences. Paris 354 (2016), number 2, pages 131-135. MR 3456887
