= Carol Berkin =

American historian and writer

- Born: October 1, 1942 (age 84); Mobile, Alabama
- Awards: Bancroft Dissertation Award

Academic background
- Education: Barnard College; Columbia University

Academic work
- Discipline: History
- Sub-discipline: American colonial history; Women's history
- Institutions: Baruch College; Graduate Center of the City University of New York

Carol Ruth Berkin (born October 1, 1942) is an American historian and author specializing in women's role in American colonial history.

== Biography ==
She was born in Mobile, Alabama. She is divorced with two children. She graduated from Barnard College in 1964 and holds a Ph.D. from Columbia University.

She taught at Baruch College from 1972 to 2008 and has taught at the Graduate Center of the City University of New York since 1983. She is currently Baruch Presidential Professor of History at the City University of New York.

She has worked as a historical commentator for several television documentaries, most notably PBS's Dolley Madison: America’s First Lady.

== Awards ==
Berkin has received the Bancroft Dissertation Award from the Bancroft Foundation. and a grant from the National Endowment for the Humanities.

== Selected works ==
- Jonathan Sewall; odyssey of an American loyalist. Columbia University Press. 1974. ISBN 0231038518. OCLC 947967.
- Making America: A History of the United States. Houghton Mifflin. 1995. ISBN 0395714370. OCLC 32065166.
- First Generations: Women in Colonial America. Hill and Wang. 1996. ISBN 0809045613. OCLC 34354867.
- A Brilliant Solution: Inventing the American Constitution. Harcourt. 2002. ISBN 0151009481. OCLC 49663906.
- Revolutionary Mothers: Women in the Struggle for America's Independence.
- Civil War Wives: The Lives & Times of Angelina Grimke Weld, Varina Howell Davis & Julia Dent Grant. Alfred A. Knopf. 2009. ISBN 9781400044467. OCLC 335678795.
- Wondrous Beauty: Betsy Bonaparte, the Belle of Baltimore Who Married Napoleon's Brother. Alfred A. Knopf. 2014. ISBN 9780307592781. OCLC 842323047. Wondrous Beauty was reviewed in the New York Times.
- A Sovereign People: The Crises of the 1790s and the Birth of American Nationalism (2017)
