= Loraine Obler =

American neuroscientist

Loraine K. Obler
- Occupation: Distinguished Professor in Speech-Language-Hearing Sciences
- Awards: Doctorate Honoris Causa

Academic background
- Education: Ph.D. University of Michigan Linguistics

Loraine Katherine Obler (born July 12, 1948) is an American linguist and neuroscientist, internationally recognized as a leading scholar in the field of neurolinguistics and multilingualism. She is known for her contributions to understanding how language-related behavior is controlled within the brain. Her work spans diverse sub-disciplines such as the neurolinguistics of bilingualism, language processing in aging and Alzheimer's disease, and the cross-language study of aphasia.

Obler is a Distinguished Professor at the CUNY Graduate Center where she holds appointments in Speech-Language-Hearing Sciences, Linguistics, and Cognitive Neuroscience.

== Awards ==
Obler received the title of Doctorate Honoris Causa from the Stockholm University in 1993 and Turku University in 2011. She is an elected Fellow of the Association for Psychological Science and the American Psychological Association (APA), Division 44. In 2023, the edited volume Advances in the Neurolinguistic Study of Multilingual and Monolingual Adults: In Honor of Professor Loraine K. Obler was published in recognition of her career contributions.

== Biography ==
Obler completed her high school education at Ethical Culture Fieldston School in New York City in 1966. In 1969, she earned her Bachelor of Arts (B.A.) from the University of Michigan with a major in Studies in Religion. Following her undergraduate studies, she pursued her further education at the University of Michigan. She obtained her first Master of Arts (M.A.) in Linguistics in 1970 and deepened her expertise by earning a second Master of Arts (M.A.) in Near East Studies in 1973 and her Ph.D. in Linguistics in 1975. Her dissertation was conducted under the supervision of Ernest T. Abdel-Massih and titled "Reflexes of the Classical Arabic šay^{ʔun} 'Thing' in the Modern Dialects: A Study in Patterns of Language Change."

Obler has had a lifelong interest in learning languages. She grew up in a predominantly English-speaking environment, but developed skills in speaking and understanding Hebrew during yearly trips to Israel. During her high school years, she studied French, demonstrating a good reading ability. She also studied Spanish, German, and Chinese, achieving varying levels of proficiency, and dedicated four years to learning Arabic, focusing more on reading and writing than speaking.

Obler has held numerous academic and research positions. She has a longstanding association with City University of New York (CUNY), initially as a Professor of Speech-Language-Hearing Sciences and later as a Distinguished Professor. Obler has held positions at Boston University, Boston University School of Medicine, the Harold Goodglass Aphasia Research Center at the VA Boston Healthcare Center, Emerson College, and internationally at Hebrew University of Jerusalem. She was named a Senior Fulbright Specialist on Multilingual and Multicultural Issues in Speech-Language Pathology at Hadassah Academic College in Jerusalem.

Obler's work has examined a wide range of topics including language comprehension and aging, language performance under stress. development of bilingualism in immigrant communities, language processing difficulties in dementia, and agrammatism. Her book with Martin Albert,The Bilingual Brain: Neuropsychological and Neurolinguistic Aspects of Bilingualism, become an important reference in the emerging field of neurolinguistics. The volume examined how multiple languages are organized in the brain through a comparative analysis of first and second languages. Obler has co-edited a number of scientific volumes. Language and Communication in the Elderly is a collection of articles by eminent researchers and clinicians exploring diagnostic and rehabilitive approaches to the language behavior of both normal and senile elderly persons. Bilingualism across the Lifespan: Aspects of Acquisition, Maturity and Loss is a collection of papers on the development of language over the lifespan, bilingual language acquisition, and language attrition.

Obler's work has been supported by the National Institutes of Health (NIH), the National Science Foundation, and the Israel-U.S. Binational Foundation.

== Books ==
- Albert, Martin L.; Obler, Loraine K. (1978). The Bilingual Brain: Neuropsychological and Neurolinguistic Aspects of Bilingualism. Elsevier Science. ISBN 978-0-12-048750-9.
- Hyltenstam, Kenneth; Obler, Loraine K. (1989). Bilingualism across the lifespan: aspects of acquisition, maturity and loss. Cambridge New York Melbourne: Cambridge university press. ISBN 978-0-521-35225-3.
- Menn, L., Obler, L. K., & Miceli, G. (Eds.). (1990). Agrammatic Aphasia: A Cross-language Narrative Sourcebook (Vol. 2). John Benjamins Publishing. ISBN 978-90-272-2045-5
- Obler, Loraine K.; Albert, Martin L. (1980). Language and Communication in the Elderly: Clinical, Therapeutic, and Experimental Issues. Lexington Books. ISBN 978-0-669-03868-2.
- Obler, L. K., & Fein, D. E. (1988). The Exceptional Brain: Neuropsychology of Talent and Special Abilities. Guilford Press.
- Obler, L. K., & Gjerlow, K. (1999). Language and the Brain. Cambridge University Press.

== Representative publications ==
- Obler, Loraine K. (June 2012). "Conference interpreting as extreme language use". International Journal of Bilingualism. 16 (2): 177–182. doi:10.1177/1367006911403199. S2CID 144596776.
- Obler, Loraine K.; Albert, Martin L. (1981). "Language and Aging: A Neurobehavioral Analysis". In Beasley, Daniel S.; Davis, George Albyn (eds.). Aging, Communication Processes and Disorders. Grune & Stratton. pp. 107–121. ISBN 978-0-8089-1281-1.
- Obler, Loraine K. (1983). "Language and Brain Dysfunction in Dementia". Language Functions and Brain Organization. pp. 267–282. doi:10.1016/b978-0-12-635640-3.50020-5. ISBN 978-0-12-635640-3.
- Obler, Loraine K.; Menn, Lise (January 1988). "Agrammatism — The current issues". Journal of Neurolinguistics. 3 (1): 63–76. doi:10.1016/0911-6044(88)90006-1. S2CID 53178439.
- Obler, Loraine K.; Albert, Martin L.; Goodglass, Harold; Benson, D.Frank (November 1978). "Aphasia type and aging". Brain and Language. 6 (3): 318–322. doi:10.1016/0093-934X(78)90065-2. PMID 737532. S2CID 36110743.
- Obler, Loraine K.; Fein, Deborah; Nicholas, Marjorie; Albert, Martin L. (December 1991). "Auditory comprehension and aging: Decline in syntactic processing". Applied Psycholinguistics. 12 (4): 433–452. doi:10.1017/S0142716400005865. S2CID 145802740.
- Obler, Loraine K.; Zatorre, Robert J.; Galloway, Linda; Vaid, Jyotsna (January 1982). "Cerebral lateralization in bilinguals: Methodological issues". Brain and Language. 15 (1): 40–54. doi:10.1016/0093-934X(82)90045-1. PMID 7059790. S2CID 26697233.

== Lectures and interviews ==
- Loraine Obler lecture at the launch of the Centre for Research in Language Throughout the Lifespan
- Loraine Obler lecture at the CUNY Graduate Center & Hadassah Academic College
- Loraine Obler & Peggy Conner - Cognitive Underpinnings of Language-Learning in Polyglots
- Loraine Obler Pioneers of WoW Interview Series
- Loraine Obler Interview at MIC Stony Brook University
