= Gustavus Myers =

American journalist

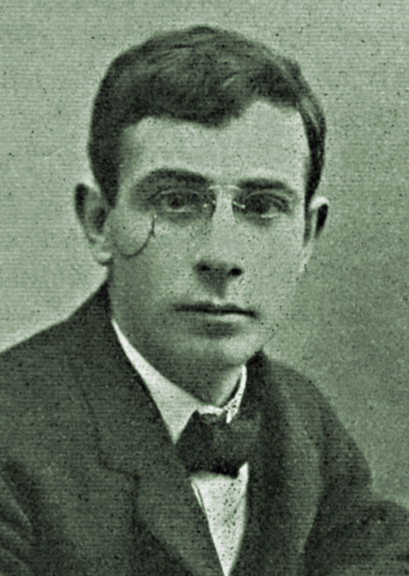
- Born: March 20, 1872; Trenton, New Jersey, US
- Died: December 7, 1942 (aged 70); New York City, US
- Occupations: Journalist and author

Gustavus Myers (March 20, 1872 – 1942) was an American journalist and historian who published a series of highly critical and influential studies on the social costs of wealth accumulation.

The Gustavus Myers Outstanding Book Award was named after him, which honoured books which were judged to be "outstanding in helping shed light on bigotry in America".

== Childhood and family ==
Gustavus Myers was born March 20, 1872, in Trenton, New Jersey, the son of Julia Hillman and Abram Myers. He attended school for a time while the impoverished family lived in Philadelphia. His father was largely absent. At the age of 14 Myers began working in a factory. He continued his own education by reading avidly and attending public lectures. His older brother Jerome Myers became a painter associated with the Ashcan School. Gustavus married Genevieve Whitne, Massachusetts, on September 23, 1904, and they had two children together (Marcella and Theo).

== Career ==
In 1891, Myers went to work as a reporter for the Philadelphia Record, leaving the next year for New York City, where he remained for the rest of his life. In the 1890s, Myers became a member of the People's Party (commonly known as the "Populists"), later joining the Socialist Party of America (SPA).

He published 'The History of Tammany Hall' in 1901, and to explore his interest in parapsychology, Beyond the Borderline of Life in (1910). In the 1910s, he emerged as a leading scholar on American socialism by authoring a series of volumes for the Charles H. Kerr Publishing Company, the country's largest publisher of pamphlets and books on Marxism.

Between 1909 and 1914 Myers published three volumes on the history of family wealth in the United States, one volume on the same topic for Canada, and a history of the Supreme Court of the United States. These publications were frequently cited and used in an academic setting for several decades, with Myers' History of the Great American Fortunes revived in a single volume format in 1936.

History of the Great American Fortunes was Myers' most important and influential work, arguing that corruption and criminality underlined the formation and accumulation of the great American fortunes of the 19th century. From Astor and Vanderbilt, Jay Gould and Marshall Field, Stanford and Harriman, to Elkins, Morgan and Hill, Whitney, Rockefeller, Dodge, Havemeyer and numerous others, Myers detailed the what he saw as permanently devastating effects of wealth accumulation on the structure of the American economy, society, and the quality of life of the vast majority of Americans.

Myers' approach was by no means Marxist and he split with the Socialist Party of America (SPA) in 1917 over the SPA's position against US involvement in World War I. In 1918, Myers contributed to the US war effort by publishing a book attacking what he called "Germany's Sinister Propaganda," The German Myth: The Falsity of Germany's "Social Progress" Claims. Myers received a Guggenheim Fellowship in 1941, which he used to write a book entitled History of Bigotry in the United States.

== Death ==
Gustavus Myers died on December 7, 1942, in Bronx, New York, at the age of 70. He is buried in the historic Woodlawn Cemetery in the Bronx.

== Legacy ==
Myers has been associated with the muckraking era of US literature, somewhat erroneously, since his work was not journalistic, did not aim at popular magazine publication, and took a scholarly, investigative and documentary approach to its subjects.

His papers are housed at the American Heritage Center of the University of Wyoming at Laramie. Included in the 2.5 cubic feet (71 L) of archival material are photographs of Myers and the manuscripts of two unpublished non-fiction books. A finding aid is available on site.

The Gustavus Myers Center for the Study of Bigotry and Human Rights existed from 1984 to 2009. Founded by James R. Bennett (born 1932), a professor of English at the University of Arkansas, it took its name in inspiration from Myer's final work. The center was most known for the Gustavus Myers Outstanding Book Award, ten of which were given out each year for books which were judged to be "outstanding in helping shed light on bigotry in America."

== Works ==
- History of Public Franchises in New York City. New York: Reform Club Committee on City Affairs, 1900.
- The History of Tammany Hall New York: self-published, 1901.
- Making of America: The History of Tammany Hall, Boni and Liveright, 1917.
- “Bolshevist Propaganda Ninety Years Ago,” The Weekly Review, Vol. I, May/December, 1919.
- History of the Great American Fortunes. Volume 1; Volume 2; Volume 3. Chicago: Charles H. Kerr & Co., 1909–1910.
- History of the Great American Fortunes. Single volume expanded edition, New York, Modern Library, 1936.
- Beyond the Borderline of Life: A Summing Up of the Results of the Scientific Investigation of Psychic Phenomena. Boston: Ball Publishing Co., 1910.
- History of The Supreme Court of the United States. Chicago: Charles H. Kerr & Co., 1912.
- A History of Canadian Wealth. Chicago: Charles H. Kerr & Co., 1914.
- "A Study of the Causes of Industrial Accidents," Journal of the American Statistical Association, Vol. 14 (Sept. 1915), pp. 672–694.
- The German Myth: The Falsity of Germany's "Social Progress" Claims. New York: Boni and Liveright, 1918.
- Ye Olden Blue Laws. New York: Century Co., 1921.
- The History of American Idealism. New York: Boni and Liveright, 1925.
- America Strikes Back: A Record of Contrasts. New York: Ives Washburn, 1935.
- The Ending of Hereditary American Fortunes. New York: J. Messner, 1939.
- History of Bigotry in the United States. New York: Random House, 1943.
