= Anthony Picciano =

American scholar, writer, and academic (born 1947)

Anthony G. Picciano
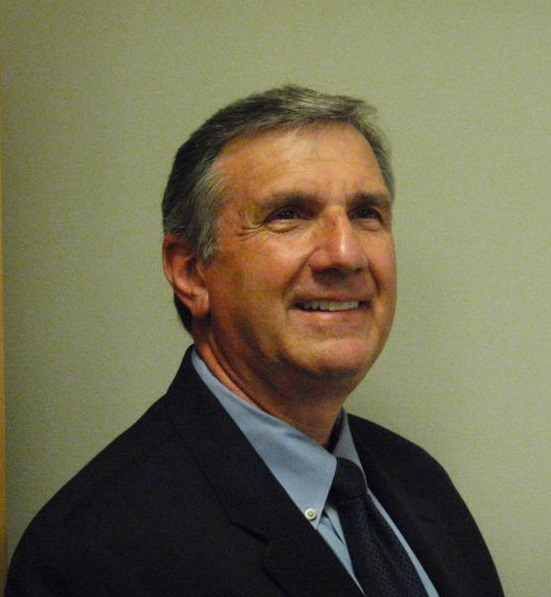
- Born: August 19, 1947 (age 78); New York City
- Website: anthonypicciano.com

Anthony G. Picciano is an American scholar, writer, and academic who has made significant contributions to the study of digital technology in education leadership, planning, and instruction. He has conducted major national studies with Jeff Seaman on instructional technology use in American K-12 education. He holds faculty positions at Hunter College and the Graduate Center, both at the City University of New York.

== Early life and career ==
Picciano was born on August 19, 1947, in New York City. He attended Catholic schools and upon graduation from high school enrolled at Hunter College on a part-time basis and worked full-time and was introduced to the then-new field of computer programming. In 1967, he decided to attend college full-time and worked part-time at the Hunter College Computer Center. Upon graduation in 1970, he began his professional work as a computer specialist. He taught his first college-level course in computer programming and systems analysis in 1971.

In the 1970s and 1980s, Picciano was involved with developing computer facilities, computer-assisted instruction (CAI) laboratories, data-management systems, and communication networks at the City University of New York and the State University of New York. In the late 1970s and 1980s, he held administrative positions and was appointed in 1985 as vice president and deputy to President Donna Shalala at Hunter College. In 1986, he completed a Ph.D. in education leadership from Fordham University. His dissertation examined computer-support systems for decision making and was based on the work of Herbert Simon. In 1989, he decided to leave administration and focus his career on teaching and scholarship and was appointed to the faculty in the Hunter College School of Education.

In the 1990s, Picciano was a fellow at the City University of New York Open Systems Laboratory where he worked on designing multimedia and distance learning teaching models. To support his work, he received funding from IBM, the Alfred P. Sloan Foundation, the National Science Foundation, and the U.S. Department of Education. In 1991, Picciano along with colleagues Steve Brier, Josh Brown, and Bret Eynon developed The Five Points, a multimedia program incorporating video from the American Social History Project, depicting Irish immigrant life in New York City in the 1850s. This program was selected to be part of several exhibits including a national exhibit entitled "New Learning Technologies" held in San Diego, California, and sponsored by IBM in June, 1992.

In 2000, Picciano became one of the founding members of the Sloan Consortium (Sloan-C) of Colleges and Universities which today is known as the Online Learning Consortium. He continues to serve on the Board of Directors of the Online Learning Consortium. He was elected to the Inaugural Class of the Sloan Consortium’s Fellows in 2010 and was also awarded the 2010 Sloan Consortium’s National Award for Outstanding Achievement in Online Education by an Individual.

=== Publications ===
Picciano has written more than twenty books and over eighty articles, book chapters, and monographs. He has edited ten special editions of the Online Learning Journal (formerly the Journal of Asynchronous Learning Networks). His articles have been published in the Online Learning Journal, Teachers College Record, Education Sciences, The Internet and Higher Education, and The Journal of Educational Multimedia and Hypermedia. His first book, entitled Computers in the Schools: A Guide to Planning and Administration was published in 1994 followed by Educational Leadership and Planning for Technology in 1998, which became one of the most widely used textbooks in this field. Five editions of Educational Leadership and Planning for Technology have been published.

In 1994, Picciano published an article, Technology and the Evolving Educational-Industrial Complex, which accurately predicted the role that technology companies and private enterprise would have in American education in the first part of the 21st century. Picciano wrote Distance Learning: Making Connections across Virtual Space and Time in 2001, which was one of the early books to explore the potential of online education. He published Education Research Primer in 2004 as an introduction to educational research and statistics. Keith Jones of University of Southampton reviewed the book and wrote "this book is eminently approachable and readable, practical and helpful."

In 2010, he co-authored with Joel Spring, The Great American-Education Industrial Complex, an in-depth examination of the nexus of education policymaking and for-profit corporate entities. In 2017, he published Online Education Policy and Practice: The Past, Present, and Future of the Digital University. In this book, Picciano predicts that augmented technology such as artificial intelligence, neural implants, intelligent self-generating nanobots, and brainnets will evolve that will redefine many human endeavors including education. In 2018, Picciano published with Chet Jordan CUNY's First Fifty years: Triumphs and Ordeals of a People's University, which is a critical history of the City University of New York.

== Bibliography ==
- Computers in the Schools: A Guide to Planning and Administration. (1994, Macmillan)
- Educational Leadership and Planning for Technology, 2nd Edition. (1998, Simon & Schuster/Prentice-Hall)

- 3rd Edition (2002)
- 4th Edition (2006)
- 5th Edition (2011)

- Distance Learning: Making Connections across Virtual Space and Time(2001, Simon & Schuster/Prentice-Hall).
- Educational Research Primer. (2004, Continuum).
- Data-Driven Decision Making for Effective School Leadership. (2006, Pearson).
- Blended Learning: Research Perspectives. Volume 1. (2007, The Sloan Consortium) with Charles Dziuban.
- The Great Education-Industrial Complex: Ideology, Technology, and Profit. (2013, Routledge/Taylor & Francis) with Joel Spring.
- Blended Learning: Research Perspectives, Volume 2. (2014, Routledge/Taylor & Francis) with Charles Dziuban and Charles Graham.
- Conducting Research in Online and Blended Learning Environments: New Pedagogical Frontiers. (2016, Routledge/Taylor & Francis) with Charles Dziuban, Charles Graham and Patsy Moskal.
- Online Education Policy and Practice: The Past, Present, and Future of the Digital University. (2017, Routledge/Taylor & Francis).
- CUNY’s First Fifty years: Triumphs and Ordeals of a People’s University. (2018, Routledge/Taylor & Francis) with Chet Jordan.
- Online Education: Foundations, Planning and Pedagogy. (2019, Routledge/Taylor & Francis).
- The Community College in the Post-Recession Reform Era. (2020, Routledge/Taylor & Francis) with Chet Jordan.
- Our Bathtub Wasn’t in the Kitchen Anymore. A novel published under the pen name, Gerade DeMichele. (2021, Bookbaby Publishers)
- The Computer Wasn’t in the Basement Anymore: My Fifty+ Years in Education Technology (1970-2021). (2021, Bookbaby Publishers) with Elaine Bowden.
- Blended learning: Research Perspectives, Volume 3. (2022, Routledge/Taylor & Francis) with Charles Dziuban, Charles Graham and Patsy Moskal.
- Data Analytics and Adaptive Learning: Research Perspectives. (2023, Routledge/Taylor & Francis) with Patsy Moskal and Charles Dziuban.
- "Is Online Technology the Hope in Uncertain Times for Higher Education". (2024, Education Sciences).
- "Online Education: Foundations, Planning, and Pedagogy (2nd Ed, 2026). New York: Routledge/Taylor & Francis, Publishers.

== Awards ==
- Sloan-Consortium’s (aka Online Learning Consortium) National Award for Outstanding Achievement in Online Education by an Individual. (2010).
- Elected to the Inaugural Class of the Sloan Consortium’s Fellows. (2010).
- Recipient of the Mike Ribaudo Award for Excellence in Information Technology. (2007)
- Sloan-C Distinguished Scholar in Online Learning (2001–02)
- Hunter College Presidential Award (1997)
