= Setsuko Matsunaga Nishi =

American sociologist and community activist

- Born: Setsuko Matsunaga; October 17, 1921; Los Angeles
- Died: November 18, 2012 (aged 91); Cape Breton
- Education: Washington University in St. Louis, University of Chicago
- Occupation: professor of sociology
- Known for: Asian American studies
- Spouse: Ken Nishi

Setsuko Matsunaga Nishi (née Setsuko Matsunaga; October 17, 1921 – November 18, 2012) was a pioneering community activist and researcher in the area of American race relations as well as professor of sociology at the City University of New York where she taught the first courses on Asian American studies.

== Early life and education ==
Born in Los Angeles, Nishi was the daughter of Hatsu and Tahei Matsunaga who had emigrated to the United States from Kumamoto, Japan. Her father was a hotel owner in the Little Tokyo district of Los Angeles. She attended Theodore Roosevelt High School before enrolling as a music student at the University of Southern California. A trained classical pianist, she often played with her sister Helen who was a violinist. Despite writing a telegram to President Roosevelt complaining about "internment as undemocratic", she had to interrupt her studies and her music career in spring 1942 when, as Japanese Americans, she and her family were incarcerated at the Santa Anita Assembly Center following the Japanese attack on Pearl Harbor and signing of Executive Order 9066.

Five months later, in the fall of 1942, she and her sister were among the first students to leave the internment camp thanks to the efforts of the National Japanese American Student Relocation Council. Nishi then studied sociology at Washington University in St. Louis where she earned a master's degree in 1944. She completed her education at the sociology department of the University of Chicago where she ultimately received a doctorate in 1963.

== Career ==
In Chicago, Nishi married the painter Ken Nishi in 1944 and they subsequently started a family with the birth of a son, Geoffrey. Nishi took up employment at the Pittsburgh Courier where she became the assistant of the editor, her African-American friend and supporter, P.L. Prattis. Prattis introduced her to fellow American sociologist Horace R. Cayton who helped her found the Chicago Resettlers Committee, later known as the Japanese American Service Committee. In that connection, in 1946 she published the widely distributed pamphlet Facts About Japanese Americans. In the late 1940s, she headed the Chicago Council Against Racial and Religious Discrimination which coordinated civil rights and labour groups.

In the early 1950s, the Nishis moved to Tappan, New York, where they had four more children. Nishi worked as a researcher for the National Council of Churches. Despite completing her doctoral comprehensive exams by 1951 while at University of Chicago, Nishi was unable to continue her dissertation due to financial and family obligations. Ken Nishi's hospitalization impacted his artist career and prompted Setsuko to assist with his greeting card company. With Horace Cayton, she wrote The Changing Scene (1955), a study of churches and social service.

In 1965, Nishi became professor of sociology at Brooklyn College, also teaching at the Graduate Center of the City University of New York. At Brooklyn, she delivered the first courses on Asian American studies, creating a new generation of scholars. In the 1970s, she joined the New York State Advisory Committee, which reported to the U.S. Commission on Civil Rights. She served on the committee for three decades, ultimately becoming its chair. During her teaching career, she had increasingly combined her academic assignments with community involvement. She retired in 1999.

== Later life and distinctions ==
In 2001, her husband Ken died. Nishi devoted her final years to work on the large-scale Japanese American Life Course Survey which reviewed the effects of the wartime internment of Japanese Americans. In 2007, she received a Lifetime Achievement Award from the Association for Asian American Studies and, in 2009, she was awarded the Order of the Rising Sun, Gold Rays with Neck Ribbon, by the Japanese government.

Nishi died in Cape Breton, Canada, on November 18, 2012. She is survived by her five children: Geoffrey, Lisa, Paula, Stefani, and Mia, and six grandchildren: Emiko, Lian, Mia, Béla, James, and Chloe.

== Publications ==
- Nishi, Setsuko Matsunaga (1963). Japanese American achievement in Chicago: a cultural response to degradation. University of Chicago.
- Nishi, Setsuko Matsunaga (1955). The Changing Scene: Current Trends and Issues. National Council of the Churches of Christ in the U.S.A.
