= Samuel L. Greitzer =

American mathematician (1905–1988)

Samuel Greitzer

Samuel L. Greitzer (August 10, 1905 – February 22, 1988) was an American mathematician, the founding chairman of the United States of America Mathematical Olympiad, and the publisher of the precollege mathematics journal Arbelos. Together with H.S.M. Coxeter in 1967, Greitzer coauthored the well-received textbook Geometry Revisited, which has remained in print for more than 40 years.

== Biography ==
Born in the Russian Empire, Greitzer moved to the United States in 1906, graduated from Stuyvesant High School, received his bachelor's degree in 1927 from City College of New York, and later earned a Ph.D. from Yeshiva University. He held academic positions at Yeshiva University, Brooklyn Polytechnic Institute, Columbia University, and Rutgers University. In the 1960s and 1970s, he directed a National Science Foundation summer program at Rutgers for high-ability high-school math students.

Samuel Greitzer and his wife Ethel had one son. Samuel died on February 22, 1988, in Metuchen, New Jersey.

== Selected publications ==
- Coxeter, H.S.M.; Greitzer, S.L. (1967). Geometry Revisited. Mathematical Association of America. ISBN 978-0-88385-619-2.
- Greitzer, S. (1973). "The First U.S.A. Mathematical Olympiad". American Mathematical Monthly. 80 (3): 276–281. doi:10.2307/2318449. JSTOR 2318449.
- Greitzer, Samuel (1979). International Mathematical Olympiads 1959–1977. Mathematical Association of America. ISBN 978-0-88385-627-7.
