= Laird Bergad =

American historian

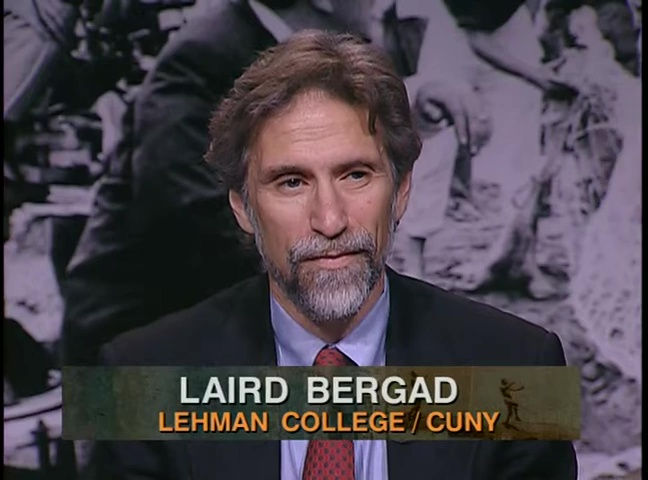
Bergad on CUNY TV's City Cinematheque, 2000

Laird W. Bergad is an American historian of Latin America and the Caribbean, currently a Distinguished Professor and founding Director of the Center for Latin American, Caribbean, and Latino Studies at the Graduate Center of the City University of New York and Lehman College. A published author, he was also one of the first American scholars to be given full access to Cuban historical archives in the 1980s, and he published 2 books from these experiences.

== Biography ==
Bergad was born and raised in Pittsburgh and received a B.A. in History from the University of Wisconsin in 1970. He later enrolled at the University of Pittsburgh where he gained an M.A. in 1974 and was then awarded a Ph.D. in Latin American and Caribbean history in 1980. He has traveled widely through Latin America and has lived for extended periods both in Cuba and Brazil.

Professor Bergad’s research has centred on the social, economic, and demographic history of slave-based plantation societies in the 18th and 19th centuries. His first book, Coffee and the Growth of Agrarian Capitalism in Nineteenth-Century Puerto Rico (Princeton University Press, 1983), was based upon previously unused data at the Archivo General de Puerto Rico.

His access to Cuban historical archives during the early 1980s resulted in the publication of two books. The first, Cuban Rural Society in the Nineteenth Century: The Social and Economic History of Monoculture in Matanzas (Princeton University Press, 1990), documented the growth of the sugar plantation economy in the Cuban province of Matanzas during the 19th century. The second, The Cuban Slave Market, 1790-1880 (Cambridge University Press, 1995), co-authored with Fe Iglesias García and María Carmen Barcia of the Cuban Institute of History, examined the demographic and price structure of Cuban slave society.

His next book, The Demographic and Economic History of Slavery in Minas Gerais, Brazil, 1720-1888 (Cambridge University Press, 1999) was a study of slavery in Brazil during the 18th and 19th centuries.

He also co-authored Hispanics in the United States: A Demographic, Social, and Economic History 1980-2005 (Cambridge University Press, 2010) with Prof. Herbert S. Klein, Latin American Curator of the Hoover Institution at Stanford University.

His most recent works are Puerto Rican Rural Society in the Early Twentieth Century, a study of Puerto Rican history under U.S. rule, and a social, economic, and demographic history of Latinos in the New York metropolitan area 1900–2016.

He was awarded a Guggenheim Fellowship in 1986.
