= Anneli Lax =

American mathematician

- Born: February 23, 1922; Katowice
- Died: September 24, 1999 (aged 77); New York City
- Education: Adelphi University (1942); New York University (1956)
- Spouse: Peter Lax (m. 1948)
- Children: 2
- Scientific career
- Fields: Mathematics
- Workplaces: New York University
- Thesis: On Cauchy's Problem for Partial Differential Equations with Multiple Characteristics (1956)
- Doctoral advisor: Richard Courant
- Doctoral students: Elena Marchisotto

Anneli Cahn Lax (23 February 1922, Katowice – 24 September 1999, New York City) was an American mathematician, who was known for being an editor of the Mathematics Association of America's New Mathematical Library Series, and for her work in reforming mathematics education with the inclusion of language skills. She was a professor of mathematics at New York University's Courant Institute. She was married to the mathematician Peter Lax.

== Life ==
=== Career ===
In 1942, she earned a bachelor's degree in mathematics at Adelphi University in Long Island. In 1956, she earned a PhD from New York University with the dissertation Cauchy's Problem for a Partial Differential Equation with Real Multiple Characteristics with thesis adviser Richard Courant.

She became a mathematics professor at NYU and was the editor of the Mathematics Association of America's New Mathematical Library Series. Lax and her colleagues planned the series to make mathematics accessible to the average reader while still being technically accurate. In 1961, the first two books were Numbers: Rational and Irrational by Ivan Niven and What Is Calculus About? by W. W. Sawyer. By 1995, the series had expanded to 36 published volumes.

In 1977, she won the first annual George Pólya Award for her College Mathematics Journal article: "Linear Algebra, A Potent Tool". In 1980, the mathematics department of New York University assigned Lax to design a remedial course in mathematics for freshmen. The course she devised and called "Mathematical Thinking" presented mathematics not as a body of facts but as a set of problems to be analyzed and resolved.

"There is a misconception among people and schoolchildren about the nature of mathematics", she said, in a 1979 interview. "They consider it a matter of rules and regulations instead of thinking." The pressure, she said, was for pupils to come up with the right answer quickly, without time to analyze.

She teamed up with John Devine, working with teachers in inner-city New York schools. Together they got funding from the Ford Foundation to train teachers from these schools in the methods Lax had pioneered at New York University.

Though she was involved with reforming mathematics education for high school and college students in New York, she didn't like panel discussions at conferences, especially when she was meant to reply immediately to preceding remarks by fellow panelists. Anneli said she was a slow listener and reader. She believed her responses were "not ready for public consumption when my turn comes."

An insert from her writing at the Mathematics as a Humanistic Discipline Session stated: "I am convinced that the use of language – reading, writing, listening and speaking – is an essential part of learning anything, and especially mathematics."

Anneli knew from her experience as teacher, that students learn new material easily when they are able to connect to their past experiences or the outside world. She looked at the mandated syllabi from 6th–8th grade New York middle schools for "integrated math sequences" and she found that because so many topics were covered, there was little time for students to connect mathematics outside of the classroom before they were tested.

A keystone in Lax's work of reforming education was the emphasis on listening. She taught pre-calculus classes by asking her students to explain the meaning behind exponential functions orally and written accounts of how they solved the problem. She believed listening to the students' ideas would improve students' performance and attitude about mathematics.

She was a member of the New York Academy of Sciences. In 1993, one of the last projects Lax worked on with her husband was the Parent's Guide. Parent's Guide constructed a basic mathematics list for adults to use to help their children with their schoolwork.

In 1995, the Mathematical Association of America awarded Lax its highest recognition, the Gung and Hu Award for Distinguished Service, for her contributions to mathematical publishing and education in a broad sense.

In 1998, she was diagnosed with pancreatic cancer. Anneli Cahn Lax died on September 24, 1999, at the age of 77.

=== Personal life ===
In 1948, Anneli Cahn married her second husband, the mathematician Peter Lax. She had two sons, John and James Lax. The John Lax Memorial Lecture was created in 1982 by Anneli and Peter, in memory of their son, who taught history at Mount Holyoke College and as a Columbia University graduate student was killed by a drunk driver. The Lax Lecture is given by a historian of the highest distinction to commemorate the work and spirit of John Lax by making the latest advances in history accessible to the public. Elena Marchisotto, a family friend and thesis student, said Anneli spent her last summer in the Adirondacks with her husband and family.
