= Jürg Peter Buser =

Swiss mathematician

Jürg Peter Buser, known as Peter Buser, (born 27 February 1946 in Basel) is a Swiss mathematician, specializing in differential geometry and global analysis.

== Education and career ==
Buser received his doctorate in 1976 from the University of Basel with advisor Heinz Huber and thesis Untersuchungen über den ersten Eigenwert des Laplaceoperators auf kompakten Flächen (Studies on the first eigenvalue of the Laplace operator on compact surfaces). As a post-doctoral student he was at the University of Bonn, the University of Minnesota. and the State University of New York at Stony Brook, before he habilitated at the University of Bonn with a thesis on the length spectrum of Riemann surfaces.

Buser is known for his construction of curved isospectral surfaces (published in 1986 and 1988). His 1988 construction led to a negative solution to Mark Kac's famous 1966 problem Can one hear the shape of a drum?. The negative solution was published in 1992 by Scott Wolpert, David Webb and Carolyn S. Gordon. The Cheeger-Buser inequality is named after him and Jeff Cheeger.

He has been a professor at the École Polytechnique Fédérale de Lausanne (EPFL) since 1982. From 2004 to 2005 he was president of the Swiss Mathematical Society. In 2003 he was made an honorary doctor of the University of Helsinki.

== Selected publications ==
- Buser, Peter (1978). "Über eine Ungleichung von Cheeger". Mathematische Zeitschrift. 158 (3): 245–252. doi:10.1007/BF01214795.
- "On Cheeger's inequality $\lambda_1\geq h^2/4$". Geometry of the Laplace Operator. Proceedings of Symposia in Pure Mathematics. Vol. 36. American Mathematical Society. 1980. pp. 29–78. doi:10.1090/pspum/036. ISBN 9780821814390.
- with Hermann Karcher: Buser, Peter; Karcher, Hermann (1981). "The bieberbach case in gromov's almost flat manifold theorem". Global Differential Geometry and Global Analysis. Lecture Notes in Mathematics. Vol. 838. pp. 82–93. doi:10.1007/BFb0088844. ISBN 978-3-540-10285-4. ISSN 0075-8434.
- with Hermann Karcher: Gromov`s almost flat manifolds, Astérisque 1981, Nr. 81, p. 148
- "A note on the isoperimetric constant." In Annales scientifiques de l'École Normale Supérieure, vol. 15, no. 2, 1982, pp. 213-230.
- "On the bipartition of graphs." Discrete Applied Mathematics 9, no. 1 (1984): 105–109.
- Isospectral Riemann Surfaces, Annales Institut Fourier (Grenoble), vol. 36, 1986, pp. 167–192
- Cayley graphs and planar isospectral domains, in Toshikazu Sunada (ed.), Geometry and Analysis on Manifolds, Springer Verlag, Lecture Notes in Mathematics, vol. 1339, 1988, pp. 64–77 doi:10.1007/BFb0083047
- Geometry and Spectra of Compact Riemann Surfaces, Birkhäuser 1992; 2010 pbk reprint
- with John Horton Conway, Peter Doyle, and Klaus-Dieter Semmler: Buser, Peter; Conway, John; Doyle, Peter; Semmler, Klaus-Dieter (1994). "Some planar isospectral domains" (PDF). International Mathematics Research Notices. 1994 (9): 391–400. doi:10.1155/S1073792894000437.
- with Peter Sarnak: Buser, P.; Sarnak, P. (1994). "On the period matrix of a Riemann surface of large genus (with an Appendix by J.H. Conway and N.J.A. Sloane)". Inventiones Mathematicae. 117 (1): 27–56. Bibcode:1994InMat.117...27B. doi:10.1007/BF01232233. ISSN 0020-9910. S2CID 116904696.
- with Mika Seppälä: Buser, Peter; Seppälä, Mika (2003). "Triangulations and homology of Riemann surfaces". Proceedings of the American Mathematical Society. 131 (2): 425–432. doi:10.1090/S0002-9939-02-06470-5. ISSN 0002-9939.
