= Gassmann =

Gassmann or Gaßmann is a German surname. Notable people with the surname include:

- Alessandro Gassmann (born 1965), Italian actor
- Florian Leopold Gassmann (1729–1774), German-speaking Bohemian opera composer
- Fritz Gassmann (1899–1990), Swiss mathematician and geophysicist
- Georg Gaßmann (1910–1987), German politician
- Jasmin Gassmann (born 1989), German actress
- Eugen Scotoni-Gassmann (1873–1961), Austrian-born Swiss businessman

== See also ==
- Georg-Gaßmann-Stadion, multi-purpose stadium in the district of Ockershausen in Marburg, Germany
- Gassmann triple, a group G together with two faithful actions on sets X and Y, such that X and Y are not isomorphic as G-sets but every element of G has the same number of fixed points on X and Y
- Gasman (disambiguation)
- Gasmann
- Gassman
