= Hearing the shape of a drum =

Mathematical problem in spectral theory

Mathematically ideal drums with membranes of these two different shapes (but otherwise identical) would sound the same, because the eigenfrequencies are all equal, so the timbral spectra would contain the same overtones. This example was constructed by S. J. Chapman. Notice that both polygons have the same area and perimeter.

In theoretical mathematics, the conceptual problem of "hearing the shape of a drum" refers to the prospect of inferring information about the shape of a hypothetical idealized drumhead from the sound it makes when struck, i.e. from analysis of overtones.

"Can One Hear the Shape of a Drum?" is the title of a 1966 article by Mark Kac in the American Mathematical Monthly which made the question famous, though this particular phrasing originates with Lipman Bers. Similar questions can be traced back all the way to physicist Arthur Schuster in 1882. For his paper, Kac was given the Lester R. Ford Award in 1967 and the Chauvenet Prize in 1968.

The frequencies at which a drumhead can vibrate depend on its shape. The Helmholtz equation calculates the frequencies if the shape is known. These frequencies are the eigenvalues of the Laplacian in the space. A central question is whether the shape can be predicted if the frequencies are known; for example, whether a Reuleaux triangle can be recognized in this way. Kac admitted that he did not know whether it was possible for two different shapes to yield the same set of frequencies. The question of whether the frequencies determine the shape was finally answered in the negative in the early 1990s by Carolyn S. Gordon, David Webb and Scott A. Wolpert.

== Formal statement ==
More formally, the drum is conceived as an elastic membrane whose boundary is clamped. It is represented as a domain D in the plane. Denote by λ_{n} the Dirichlet eigenvalues for D: that is, the eigenvalues of the Dirichlet problem for the Laplacian:

$$\begin{cases}
\Delta u + \lambda u = 0\\
u|_{\partial D} = 0
\end{cases}$$

Two domains are said to be isospectral (or homophonic) if they have the same eigenvalues. The term "homophonic" is justified because the Dirichlet eigenvalues are precisely the fundamental tones that the drum is capable of producing: they appear naturally as Fourier coefficients in the solution wave equation with clamped boundary.

Therefore, the question may be reformulated as: what can be inferred on D if one knows only the values of λ_{n}? Or, more specifically: are there two distinct domains that are isospectral?

Related problems can be formulated for the Dirichlet problem for the Laplacian on domains in higher dimensions or on Riemannian manifolds, as well as for other elliptic differential operators such as the Cauchy–Riemann operator or Dirac operator. Other boundary conditions besides the Dirichlet condition, such as the Neumann boundary condition, can be imposed. See spectral geometry and isospectral as related articles.

== The answer ==
One-parameter family of isospectral drums

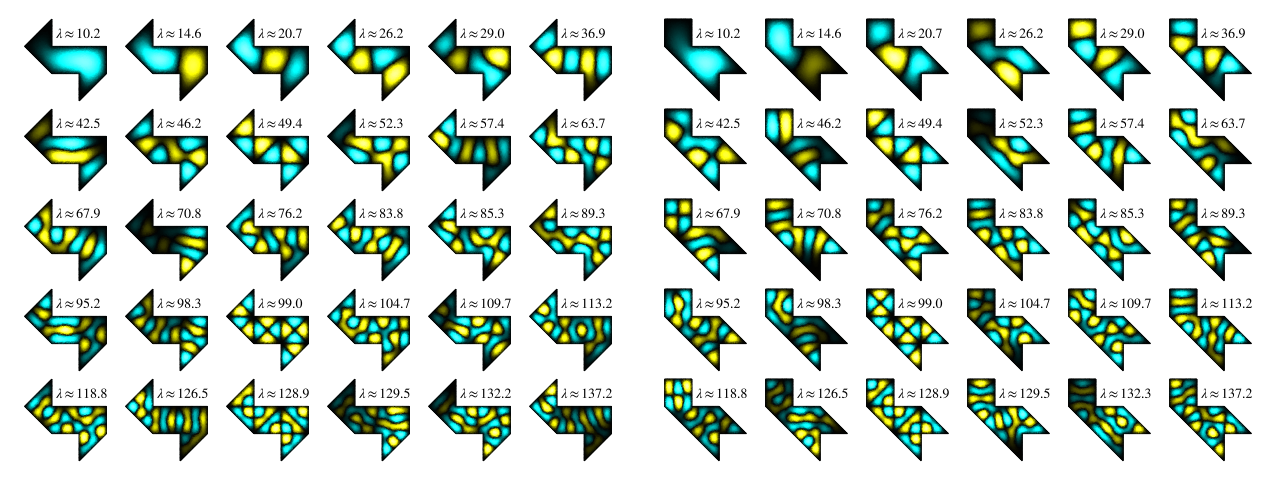
Eigenmodes and corresponding eigenvalues of the Laplace operator on the GWW domains

In 1964, John Milnor observed that a theorem on lattices due to Ernst Witt implied the existence of a pair of 16-dimensional flat tori that have the same eigenvalues but different shapes. However, the problem in two dimensions remained open until 1992, when Carolyn Gordon, David Webb, and Scott Wolpert constructed, based on the Sunada method, a pair of regions in the plane that have different shapes but identical eigenvalues. The regions are concave polygons. The proof that both regions have the same eigenvalues uses the symmetries of the Laplacian. This idea has been generalized by Buser, Conway, Doyle, and Semmler who constructed numerous similar examples. So, the answer to Kac's question is: for many shapes, one cannot hear the shape of the drum completely. However, some information can be inferred.

On the other hand, Steve Zelditch proved that the answer to Kac's question is positive if one imposes restrictions to certain convex planar regions with analytic boundary. It is not known whether two non-convex analytic domains can have the same eigenvalues. It is known that the set of domains isospectral with a given one is compact in the C^{∞} topology. Moreover, the sphere (for instance) is spectrally rigid, by Cheng's eigenvalue comparison theorem. It is also known, by a result of Osgood, Phillips, and Sarnak that the moduli space of Riemann surfaces of a given genus does not admit a continuous isospectral flow through any point, and is compact in the Fréchet–Schwartz topology.

== Weyl's formula ==
Weyl's formula states that one can infer the area A of the drum by counting how rapidly the λ_{n} grow. We define N(R) to be the number of eigenvalues smaller than R and we get

$$A = \omega_d^{-1}(2\pi)^d \lim_{R\to\infty}\frac{N(R)}{R^{d/2}},$$

where d is the dimension, and $\omega_d$ is the volume of the d-dimensional unit ball. Weyl also conjectured that the next term in the approximation below would give the perimeter of D. In other words, if L denotes the length of the perimeter (or the surface area in higher dimension), then one should have

$$N(R) = (2\pi)^{-d}\omega_d AR^{d/2} \mp \frac{1}{4}(2\pi)^{-d+1}\omega_{d-1} LR^{(d-1)/2} + o(R^{(d-1)/2}).$$

For a smooth boundary, this was proved by Victor Ivrii in 1980. The manifold is also not allowed to have a two-parameter family of periodic geodesics, such as a sphere would have.

== The Weyl–Berry conjecture ==
For non-smooth boundaries, Michael Berry conjectured in 1979 that the correction should be of the order of

$$R^{D/2},$$

where D is the Hausdorff dimension of the boundary. This was disproved by J. Brossard and R. A. Carmona, who then suggested that one should replace the Hausdorff dimension with the upper box dimension. In the plane, this was proved if the boundary has dimension 1 (1993), but mostly disproved for higher dimensions (1996); both results are by Michel Lapidus and Carl Pomerance.

== See also ==
- Gassmann triple
- Isospectral
- Spectral geometry
- Vibrations of a circular membrane
