= Toshikazu Sunada =

Japanese mathematician (born 1948)

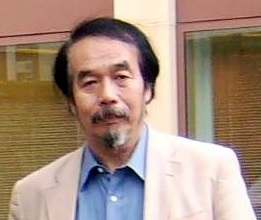
- Born: 1948 (age 77–78); Tokyo, Japan
- Education: Tokyo Institute of Technology
- Awards: 1987 Iyanaga Award of Mathematical Society of Japan; 2013 Publication Prize of Mathematical Society of Japan; 2017 Hiroshi Fujiwara Prize for Mathematical Sciences; 2018 Prize for Science and Technology (the Commendation for Science and Technology by the Minister of Education, Culture, Sports, Science and Technology); 2019 the 1st Kodaira Kunihiko Prize
- Scientific career
- Fields: Mathematics (Spectral geometry and discrete geometric analysis)
- Workplaces: Nagoya University; Tokyo University; Tohoku University; Meiji University

Toshikazu Sunada (砂田 利一, Sunada Toshikazu; born September 7, 1948) is a Japanese mathematician and author of many books and essays on mathematics and mathematical sciences. He is professor emeritus of both Meiji University and Tohoku University. He is also distinguished professor of emeritus at Meiji in recognition of achievement over the course of an academic career. Before he joined Meiji University in 2003, he was professor of mathematics at Nagoya University (1988–1991), at the University of Tokyo (1991–1993), and at Tohoku University (1993–2003). Sunada was involved in the creation of the School of Interdisciplinary Mathematical Sciences at Meiji University and is its first dean (2013–2017). Since 2019, he is President of Mathematics Education Society of Japan.

== Main work ==
Sunada's work covers complex analytic geometry, spectral geometry, dynamical systems, probability, graph theory, discrete geometric analysis, and mathematical crystallography. Among his numerous contributions, the most famous one is a general construction of isospectral manifolds (1985), which is based on his geometric model of number theory, and is considered to be a breakthrough in the problem proposed by Mark Kac in "Can one hear the shape of a drum?" (see Hearing the shape of a drum). Sunada's idea was taken up by Carolyn S. Gordon, David Webb, and Scott A. Wolpert when they constructed a counterexample for Kac's problem. For this work, Sunada was awarded the Iyanaga Prize of the Mathematical Society of Japan (MSJ) in 1987. He was also awarded Publication Prize of MSJ in 2013, the Hiroshi Fujiwara Prize for Mathematical Sciences in 2017, the Prize for Science and Technology (the Commendation for Science and Technology by the Minister of Education, Culture, Sports, Science and Technology) in 2018, and the 1st Kodaira Kunihiko Prize in 2019.

In a joint work with Atsushi Katsuda, Sunada also established a geometric analogue of Dirichlet's theorem on arithmetic progressions in the context of dynamical systems (1988). One can see, in this work as well as the one above, how the concepts and ideas in totally different fields (geometry, dynamical systems, and number theory) are put together to formulate problems and to produce new results.

His study of discrete geometric analysis includes a graph-theoretic interpretation of Ihara zeta functions, a discrete analogue of periodic magnetic Schrödinger operators as well as the large time asymptotic behaviors of random walk on crystal lattices. The study of random walk led him to the discovery of a "mathematical twin" of the diamond crystal out of an infinite universe of hypothetical crystals (2005). He named it the K_{4} crystal due to its mathematical relevance (see the linked article). What was noticed by him is that the K_{4} crystal has the "strong isotropy property", meaning that for any two vertices x and y of the crystal net, and for any ordering of the edges adjacent to x and any ordering of the edges adjacent to y, there is a net-preserving congruence taking x to y and each x-edge to the similarly ordered y-edge. This property is shared only by the diamond crystal (the strong isotropy should not be confused with the edge-transitivity or the notion of symmetric graph; for instance, the primitive cubic lattice is a symmetric graph, but not strongly isotropic). The K_{4} crystal and the diamond crystal as networks in space are examples of “standard realizations”, the notion introduced by Sunada and Motoko Kotani as a graph-theoretic version of Albanese maps (Abel-Jacobi maps) in algebraic geometry.

For his work, see also Isospectral, Reinhardt domain, Ihara zeta function, Ramanujan graph, quantum ergodicity, quantum walk.

== Selected publications by Sunada ==
- T. Sunada, Holomorphic equivalence problem for bounded Reinhardt domains, Mathematische Annalen 235 (1978), 111–128
- T. Sunada, Rigidity of certain harmonic mappings, Inventiones Mathematicae 51 (1979), 297–307
- J. Noguchi and T. Sunada, Finiteness of the family of rational and meromorphic mappings into algebraic varieties, American Journal of Mathematics 104 (1982), 887–900
- T. Sunada, Riemannian coverings and isospectral manifolds, Annals of Mathematics 121 (1985), 169–186
- T. Sunada, L-functions and some applications, Lecture Notes in Mathematics 1201 (1986), Springer-Verlag, 266–284
- A. Katsuda and T. Sunada, Homology and closed geodesics in a compact Riemann surface, American Journal of Mathematics 110(1988), 145–156
- T. Sunada, Unitary representations of fundamental groups and the spectrum of twisted Laplacians, Topology 28 (1989), 125–132
- A. Katsuda and T. Sunada, Closed orbits in homology classes, Publications Mathématiques de l'IHÉS 71 (1990), 5–32
- M. Nishio and T. Sunada, Trace formulae in spectral geometry, Proc. ICM-90 Kyoto, Springer-Verlag, Tokyo, (1991), 577–585
- T. Sunada, Quantum ergodicity, Trend in Mathematics, Birkhauser Verlag, Basel, 1997, 175–196
- M. Kotani and T. Sunada, Albanese maps and an off diagonal long time asymptotic for the heat kernel, Communications in Mathematical Physics 209 (2000), 633–670
- M. Kotani and T. Sunada, Spectral geometry of crystal lattices, Contemporary Mathematics 338 (2003), 271–305
- T. Sunada, Crystals that nature might miss creating, Notices of the American Mathematical Society 55 (2008), 208–215
- T. Sunada, Discrete geometric analysis, Proceedings of Symposia in Pure Mathematics (ed. by P. Exner, J. P. Keating, P. Kuchment, T. Sunada, A. Teplyaev), 77 (2008), 51–86
- K. Shiga and T. Sunada, A Mathematical Gift, III, American Mathematical Society
- T. Sunada, Lecture on topological crystallography, Japan Journal of Mathematics 7 (2012), 1–39
- T. Sunada, Topological Crystallography, With a View Towards Discrete Geometric Analysis, Springer, 2013, ISBN 978-4-431-54176-9 (print) ISBN 978-4-431-54177-6 (online)
- T. Sunada, Generalized Riemann sums, in From Riemann to Differential Geometry and Relativity, Editors: Lizhen Ji, Athanase Papadopoulos, Sumio Yamada, Springer (2017), 457–479
- T. Sunada, Topics on mathematical crystallography, Proceedings of the symposium Groups, graphs and random walks, London Mathematical Society Lecture Note Series 436, Cambridge University Press, 2017, 473–513
- T. Sunada, From Euclid to Riemann and beyond, in Geometry in History, Editors: S. G. Dani, Athanase Papadopoulos, Springer (2019), 213–304
