= Gausman =

Gausman is a surname. Notable people with the surname include:

- Hal Gausman (1917–2003), American set decorator
- Kevin Gausman (born 1991), American baseball player
- Russell A. Gausman (1892–1963), American set decorator

== See also ==
- Gasman (disambiguation)
- Gassman
