= Isospectral =

Linear operators with a common spectrum

In mathematics, two linear operators are called isospectral or cospectral if they have the same spectrum. Roughly speaking, they are supposed to have the same sets of eigenvalues, when those are counted with multiplicity.

The theory of isospectral operators is markedly different depending on whether the space is finite or infinite dimensional. In finite-dimensions, one essentially deals with square matrices.

In infinite dimensions, the spectrum need not consist solely of isolated eigenvalues. However, the case of a compact operator on a Hilbert space (or Banach space) is still tractable, since the eigenvalues are at most countable with at most a single limit point λ = 0. The most studied isospectral problem in infinite dimensions is that of the Laplace operator on a domain in R^{2}. Two such domains are called isospectral if their Laplacians are isospectral. The problem of inferring the geometrical properties of a domain from the spectrum of its Laplacian is often known as hearing the shape of a drum.

== Finite dimensional spaces ==
In the case of operators on finite-dimensional vector spaces, for complex square matrices, the relation of being isospectral for two diagonalizable matrices is just similarity. This doesn't however reduce completely the interest of the concept, since we can have an isospectral family of matrices of shape A(t) = M(t)^{−1}AM(t) depending on a parameter t in a complicated way. This is an evolution of a matrix that happens inside one similarity class.

A fundamental insight in soliton theory was that the infinitesimal analogue of that equation, namely

A′ = [A, M] = AM − MA

was behind the conservation laws that were responsible for keeping solitons from dissipating. That is, the preservation of spectrum was an interpretation of the conservation mechanism. The identification of so-called Lax pairs (P,L) giving rise to analogous equations, by Peter Lax, showed how linear machinery could explain the non-linear behaviour.

== Isospectral manifolds ==
Two closed Riemannian manifolds are said to be isospectral if the eigenvalues of their Laplace–Beltrami operator (Laplacians), counted multiplicities, coincide. One of fundamental problems in spectral geometry is to ask to what extent the eigenvalues determine the geometry of a given manifold.

There are many examples of isospectral manifolds which are not isometric. The first example was given in 1964 by John Milnor. He constructed a pair of flat tori of 16 dimension, using arithmetic lattices first studied by Ernst Witt. After this example, many isospectral pairs in dimension two and higher were constructed (for instance, by M. F. Vignéras, A. Ikeda, H. Urakawa, C. Gordon). In particular Vignéras (1980), based on the Selberg trace formula for PSL(2,R) and PSL(2,C), constructed examples of isospectral, non-isometric closed hyperbolic 2-manifolds and 3-manifolds as quotients of hyperbolic 2-space and 3-space by arithmetic subgroups, constructed using quaternion algebras associated with quadratic extensions of the rationals by class field theory. In this case Selberg's trace formula shows that the spectrum of the Laplacian fully determines the length spectrum, the set of lengths of closed geodesics in each free homotopy class, along with the twist along the geodesic in the 3-dimensional case.

In 1985 Toshikazu Sunada found a general method of construction based on a covering space technique, which, either in its original or certain generalized versions, came to be known as the Sunada method or Sunada construction. Like the previous methods it is based on the trace formula, via the Selberg zeta function. Sunada noticed that the method of constructing number fields with the same Dedekind zeta function could be adapted to compact manifolds. His method relies on the fact that if M is a finite covering of a compact Riemannian manifold M_{0} with G the finite group of deck transformations and H_{1}, H_{2} are subgroups of G meeting each conjugacy class of G in the same number of elements, then the manifolds H_{1} \ M and H_{2} \ M are isospectral but not necessarily isometric. Although this does not recapture the arithmetic examples of Milnor and Vignéras, Sunada's method yields many known examples of isospectral manifolds. It led C. Gordon, D. Webb and S. Wolpert to the discovery in 1991 of a counter example to Mark Kac's problem "Can one hear the shape of a drum?" An elementary treatment, based on Sunada's method, was later given in Buser et al. (1994).

Sunada's idea also stimulated the attempt to find isospectral examples which could not be obtained by his technique. Among many examples, the most striking one is a simply connected example of Schueth (1999). On the other hand, Alan Reid proved that certain isospectral arithmetic hyperbolic manifolds in are commensurable.

== See also ==
- Hearing the shape of a drum
- Spectral geometry
