= Heavy oil production =

Technology for extracting heavy oil

Heavy oil production is a developing technology for extracting heavy oil in industrial quantities. Estimated reserves of heavy oil are over 6 trillion barrels, three times that of conventional oil and gas.

Factors that affect the difficulty of putting reserves into production include permeability, porosity, depth and pressure. The density and viscosity of the oil are the determining factors. Density and viscosity determine the method of extraction.

Oil viscosity varies with temperature and determines the ease of extraction; temperature can be controlled so that oil can be moved without employing additional techniques. Density is more important for refiners since it represents the yield after distillation. However, no relationship links the two.

Oil reservoirs exist at varying depths and temperatures. Although viscosity varies significantly with temperature, density is the standard in oilfield classification. Crude oil density is commonly expressed in degrees of American Petroleum Institute (API) gravity which are associated with specific gravity. The lower the API gravity, the denser the oil. The API gravity of liquid crude oil ranges from 4º for tar rich in bitumen to condensates that have an API gravity of 70º. Heavy oils are classified between ultra-heavy oils and light oils. They have API gravities ranging between 10º and 20º.

Crude oil generated by petroleum source rocks has an API gravity of between 30º and 40º. Crude oil becomes heavy after considerable degradation, after entrapment and during devolatilization. Degradation occurs through chemical and biological processes when oil reservoirs become contaminated by bacteria through subsurface water. The bacteria then break down some crude oil components into heavy components, making it more viscous. Water carries away low molecular weight hydrocarbons in solution form since they are more soluble. When crude oil is enclosed by a poor quality seal, lighter molecules separate and escape, leaving behind the heavier components through devolatilization.

Heavy oils are commonly found in geologically young formations since they are shallow and have less efficient seals, providing the conditions for heavy oil formation.

== Terminology ==
=== Injection pattern ===
The injection pattern refers to the arrangement of the production and injector wells to the position, size, and orientation of flow of a reservoir. Injection patterns can vary over the well lifetime by moving the injection well to areas where maximum volume of contact can be achieved.

=== Geographical heterogeneity ===
Geological heterogeneity is the spatial distribution of porosity and permeability in a reservoir rock.

=== Permeability ===
Permeability depends on the size of the sediment grains that formed the rock and the manner in which they were packed. Permeability is the number of pores, and their interconnectedness in a rock and the existence of different layers in a rock with different permeability is a manifestation of geological heterogeneity. When steam injection takes place, water flows through the more permeable layers, bypassing the oil-rich less permeable layers. This causes low sweep efficiency and early water production with the volume of oil in contact with the water.

=== Sweep efficiency ===
Sweep efficiency is the measure of the effectiveness of an EOR method that depends on the total volume of the reservoir that the injected fluid contacts. Sweep efficiency is affected by multiple factors: mobility ratio, directional permeability, cumulative water injected, flood pattern, geological heterogeneity and distribution of pressure between injectors and producers.

=== Displacement efficiency ===
Displacement efficiency is the fraction of oil that is recovered from a zone that has been swept by a steam injection or any other displacement method. It is the percentage volume of oil that has been recovered through displacement by an injected fluid or displacing element injected into the reservoir. It is the difference between the volume of the reservoir before the displacement begins and the volume after the displacement has ended.

=== Amplitude versus offset ===
Amplitude Versus Offset (AVO) is a technique used in seismic inversion to forecast the existence of reservoirs, prediction of porosities and in some cases fluid type including presence of hydrocarbons. Literature reviews and studies incorporate the analysis of AVO and seismic inversion in oil exploration and rock physics studies.

Seismic waves projected into oil reservoirs undergoing steam injection give data that show the existence of high values of wave attenuation. This attenuation is usually based on velocity dispersion. Studies show seismic wave reflection between an elastic overburden and an equivalent medium have coefficients of reflection that vary with frequency. This variation, depends on the behavior of AVO at the interface. The calculation of synthetic seismographs for the ideal model is carried out using the reflectivity technique for those materials whose velocities and attenuations are frequency dependent. This is usually used since the effects of velocity and attenuation variations are detectable on stacked data.

Improved spectral decomposition techniques have shown the frequency dependent parameters more clearly. Saturated rocks, for example, have seismic low frequency effects concerning hydrocarbon-saturated rocks. Furthermore, hydrocarbon-saturated zones have extremely high values of attenuation from the direct quality factor (Q) measurements. Systemic variations of frequencies with offset, where the standard amplitude against the offset is the AVO, disregards attenuation resulting in the use of the purely reflective model. The primary objective is balancing the frequency content of near and far stacks, while correcting for the effect of the attenuation over the overburden.

AVO is used to detect the existence of oil reservoirs because of the anomaly evident in oil reservoirs where AVO rising is prominent in oil-rich sediments. It is not as useful in defining the rock formations and permeability properties to improve sweep efficiency. Furthermore, not all oil reservoirs manifest the same anomalies associated with hydrocarbon oil reservoirs since they are sometimes caused by residual hydrocarbons from breached columns of gas.

=== Seismic analysis ===
Seismic surveys are the standard method used to map the Earth's crust. Data from these surveys are used to project detailed information about the types and properties of rocks. Bouncing sound waves off rock formations underneath the surface allows the reflected waves to be analyzed. The time lapses between the incident and reflected waves, as well as the properties of the received wave, provide information about the types of rocks and the possible reserves of petroleum and gas deposits

If the geological heterogeneity of a reservoir is known, the injection patterns can be designed to direct the injections to the less permeable layers of the rock that have oil. The challenge is that the reservoir's permeability distribution is hard to determine because heterogeneity changes from one area to another. Therefore, to maximize oil recovery (sweep efficiency), it is necessary to monitor and map the orientation of the permeability layers via seismic surveys. Seismic waves are sent through the rock formations and the time lapse and distortions in the seismic waves are analyzed to map the permeability orientation to enhance the efficient installation of injection patterns.

== Oil production techniques ==
Oil recovery involves three stages of extraction: primary, secondary and tertiary. Since mobility is a ratio of effective permeability and phase viscosity, the productivity of a well is directly proportional to the product of layer thickness of the reservoir rock and mobility.

=== Primary recovery ===
Primary recovery uses the pressure build-up of gasses in the reservoir, gravity drainage or a combination of the two. These methods constitute cold production and are commonly referred to as using "natural lift". For conventional oil, cold production has a recovery factor of more than 30 percent while for heavy oil it raises 5 to 10 percent.

One variation of the cold production method is called Cold Heavy Oil Production with Sand (CHOPS). CHOPS creates a wormhole or void where oil gets pulled from the surrounding rocks towards the wellbore. These methods are termed cold production, since they are used at reservoir ambient temperature. When natural lift pressure does not generate sufficient underground pressure or when the pressure declines and is no longer sufficient to move oil through the wellbore, primary production has reached its extraction limit, to be succeeded by secondary recovery.

=== Secondary recovery ===
Secondary recovery methods also use cold production, but employ external sources of pressure to generate the required internal pressure, still at reservoir temperature. Secondary recovery methods involve the creation of artificial pressure through the injection of elements to create artificial pressure. Water, natural gas or carbon dioxide are the primary injectates. The pressure forces oil up the production well. Over time the artificial pressure loses efficacy because the remaining (heavy) oil is too viscous to flow and is held by sandstone in the reservoirs. The two cold production recovery methods have a combination recovery factor of between 10 and 20 percent depending on the oil properties and types of rocks.

=== Tertiary recovery ===
Tertiary recovery is commonly known as Enhanced Oil Recovery (EOR). It is the method of producing oil after the primary and secondary stages have extracted most of the oil in a reserve. Specifically, enhanced oil recovery is used to recover oil trapped in porous rocks and the heavy oil that is too viscous to flow. The three methods for tertiary recovery are: chemical enhanced recovery, thermal enhanced recovery, and miscible enhanced recovery.

It involves both thermal and non-thermal methods. Non-thermal methods include the use of chemicals and microbes to loosen trapped heavy oil and carbon dioxide under pressure. However, thermal methods - mainly steam injection - are the most efficient way of reducing viscosity and mobilizing heavy oil.

=== Steam injection ===
Among the three main types of steam injection, steam flooding, for example, injects pressurized steam into the injector well where it heats up and forces the more mobile oil out. EOR techniques are expensive due to the required energy and materials. Therefore, the amount of heavy oil to be recovered from a reservoir depends on the economics. Because of this, EOR begins with analysis of the reservoir, rock formations, permeability, pore geometry and viscosity. Including the heterogeneity of a reservoir, these factors influence the success of any recovery method.

Overall efficiency is the product of the sweep efficiency and displacement efficiency.

==== Cyclic steam stimulation ====
Cyclic Steam Stimulation (CSS) injects steam through a single well for a period, leaving it to heat up and reduce viscosity, then extracting oil through the same well in alternating cycles of injection and extraction.

==== Steam-assisted gravity drainage ====
Steam-Assisted Gravity Drainage (SAGD) involves the use of stacked horizontal wells. The top horizontal well is used to inject steam which heats up the surrounding heavy oil which then flows into the bottom horizontal production well.

Steam injection consists of two core methods: cyclic steam injection and steam flooding.

==== Cyclic steam injection ====
During cyclic steam circulation (CSC), steam is injected into the oil reservoir where the resulting high pressure ruptures the reservoir rocks and heats up the oil, reducing its viscosity. The oil is removed in three stages: injection, soaking and production. High-temperature, high-pressure steam is left in the reservoir from days to weeks so that the heat can be absorbed by the oil. Production then begins. Initially, production is high, but subsides as heat is lost; the process is repeated until it becomes uneconomical to do so. Cyclic steam injection recovers about 10 to 20 percent of the entire oil volume. When this method becomes uneconomical, steam injection is employed.

Steam injection is usually used in horizontal and vertical oil wells for reservoirs with viscosity as high as -100,000cP. In cyclic steam injection wells, oil can be both viscous and solid. The principal mechanism is to dissolve the "solid". No consensus establishes the ideal soaking time, which may vary from days to weeks. However, shorter soaking times are favored for operational and mechanical considerations. After the first treatment, oil production takes place through natural lifting because of the initial reservoir energy. However, for subsequent cycles, production may have to be aided with pumping. Cyclic injection becomes less and less efficient in oil production as the number of cycles increases. As many as nine cycles can be used depending on the reservoir characteristics.

==== Continuous steam injection (steam flooding) ====
This method recovers more oil than cyclic steam injection. It has lower thermal efficiency than CSC and requires a larger surface area. It uses at least two wells, one for steam injection and the other for oil production. Steam flooding recovers about 50 percent of the total oil. Steam is injected at high temperature and pressure through an injector. Steam injection techniques have become more feasible and efficient. Several variations have been developed. However, the high costs involved mandate careful evaluations, in-depth study of the oil reservoir and proper design.

== Rock physics ==
Traditionally, the properties of rocks and minerals beneath the earth's surface were defined through seismic exploration and seismology from earthquakes. Travel time, variations in phase and amplitude of seismic waves produced during seismic exploration show rock and fluid properties at the subsurface level. Previously, exploration seismology explored seismic data only for rock formations that could hold hydrocarbons. However, due technological advances, seismic data became useful to determine pore fluids, saturation, porosity and lithology.

Reservoir properties and seismic data have been linkedby a recent development called rock physics. Rock physics has been employed in the development of essential techniques such as reservoir seismic monitoring, direct hydrocarbon detection and seismic lithology discrimination using angle dependent reflectivity. Rock physics applications are based on understanding the different properties that affect seismic waves. These properties influence how waves behave as they propagate and how a change in one of those properties can produce different seismic data. Factors such as temperature, fluid type, pressure, pore type, porosity, saturation and others are interrelated in such a way that when one element changes others change as well.

=== Gassmann equation ===
Pore fluid properties and fluid substitution in rock physics are calculated using Gassmann's equation. It calculates how seismic properties are affected by the fluid change using frame features. The equation uses the known bulk moduli of the pore fluid, the solid matrix and the frame module to calculate the bulk modulus of a medium saturated with liquid. The rock-forming minerals are the solid matrix, the frame is the skeleton rock sample, while the pore fluid is gas, water, oil, or some combination. For the equation to be used, the underlying assumptions are that 1) the matrix and the frame are both macroscopically homogeneous; 2) the pores in the rock are all interconnected; 3) the fluid in the pores is frictionless; 4) the fluid system in the rock is a closed system that is it is undrained; and 5) that the fluid in the rock does not in any way interact with the solid to make the frame softer or harder.

The first assumption assures that the wavelength of the wave is longer than the pores and grain sizes of the rock. The assumption meets the general range of wave wavelengths and frequencies of the laboratory to seismic range. Assumption 2) suggests that the permeability of the rock pores is uniform and no isolated pores are present in the rock such that a passing wave induces full equilibrium of fluid flow of the pores over a half period cycle of the wave. Since pore permeability is relative to the wavelength and frequency, most rocks meet the assumption. However, for seismic waves, only unconsolidated sands satisfy this assumption, because of their high permeability and porosity. On the other hand, for the high frequencies such as logging and laboratory frequencies, most rocks can meet this assumption. As a result, the velocities calculated using Gassmann's equation are lower than those measured using logging or laboratory frequencies. Assumption 3) suggests that the fluids have no viscosity, but since in reality all fluids have the viscosity, this assumption is violated by Gassmann equations. Assumption 4) suggests that the rock-fluid flow is sealed at the boundaries for a laboratory rock sample meaning that the changes in stresses caused by a passing wave do not cause a significant flow of fluid from the rock sample. Assumption 5) prevents any disrupting interaction between the chemical or physical properties of the rock matrix and the pore fluid. This assumption is not always met because interaction is inevitable and the surface energy is usually changed because of it. For example, when sand interacts with heavy oil, the result is a high shear and bulk modulus mixture.

== Sources ==
- Al-Kindi, F.; Al-Aamri, J.; Al-Amri, M.; Al-Aamri, A.; Burns, S. (19 April 2015). 3D VSP Benefits in Heavy Oil Field in South Oman. doi:10.3997/2214-4609.201412209. ISBN 978-94-6282-144-6.
- Al-Mutairi, A.; Ren, Z.B.; Tinnin, J.R.; Randazzo, S. (2017-06-12). A Case Study of Monitoring Steam Flood Projects in Thin Vertically Stacked Reservoirs Using 3DVSP Technology. doi:10.3997/2214-4609.201700510. ISBN 978-94-6282-217-7.
- Alvarado, Vladimir; Manrique, Eduardo (2010-08-27). "Enhanced Oil Recovery: An Update Review". Energies. 3 (9): 1529–1575. doi:10.3390/en3091529.Ambastha, A. (2008). SPE Reprint Series no.61 Heavy oil recovery. Society of Petroleum Engineers. Petroleum Community Forum.
- Awan, Anwar R.; Teigland, Rune; Kleppe, Jon (2008-06-01). "A Survey of North Sea Enhanced-Oil-Recovery Projects Initiated During the Years 1975 to 2005". SPE Reservoir Evaluation & Engineering. 11 (3): 497–512. doi:10.2118/99546-PA.Beiranvand, B; Day, Z; Kamali, M.R.; Chehrazi, Ali; Ahmadi, A; Kermanshahi, H; Eimandoust, A (2017-06-12). 79th EAGE Conference and Exhibition 2017. doi:10.3997/2214-4609.201701518. ISBN 978-94-6282-217-7.
- Berron, C.; Michou, L.; Cacqueray, B. D.; Duret, F.; Cotton, J.; Forgues, E. (2015). Permanent, continuous & unmanned 4D seismic monitoring: Peace River case study. SEG Technical Program Expanded Abstracts 2015. Society of Exploration Geophysicists. pp. 5419–5423. doi:10.1190/segeab.34.
- Drummond, C.; Israelachvili, J. (2004-11-30). "Fundamental studies of crude oil–surface water interactions and its relationship to reservoir wettability". Journal of Petroleum Science and Engineering. 45 (1–2): 61–81. doi:10.1016/j.petrol.2004.04.007. ISSN 0920-4105.
- Frampton, H.; Denyer, P.; Ohms, D. H.; Husband, M.; Mustoni, J. L. (2009-04-27). Sweep Improvement from the Lab to the Field. doi:10.3997/2214-4609.201404858. ISBN 978-90-73781-60-3.
- Istchenko, Christopher M.; Gates, Ian (2014-04-09). "Well/Wormhole Model of Cold Heavy-Oil Production With Sand". SPE Journal. 19 (2): 260–269. doi:10.2118/150633-PA.
- Lumley, David E. (2012-02-07). "Time-lapse seismic reservoir monitoring". Geophysics. 66 (1): 50–53. doi:10.1190/1.1444921.
- Martinius, A. W.; Ringrose, P. S.; Brostrøm, C.; Elfenbein, C.; Næss, A.; Ringås, J. E. (2005-01-01). "Reservoir challenges of heterolithic tidal sandstone reservoirs in the Halten Terrace, mid-Norway". Petroleum Geoscience. 11 (1): 3–16. doi:10.1144/1354-079304-629. ISSN 1354-0793. S2CID 128601277.
- Muggeridge, Ann; Cockin, Andrew; Webb, Kevin; Frampton, Harry; Collins, Ian; Moulds, Tim; Salino, Peter (2014-01-13). "Recovery rates, enhanced oil recovery and technological limits". Philosophical Transactions of the Royal Society A: Mathematical, Physical and Engineering Sciences. 372 (2006) 20120320. doi:10.1098/rsta.2012.0320. PMC 3866386. PMID 24298076.
- Passalacqua, H; Strack, Kurt (2016-01-01). Integrated Geophysical Reservoir Monitoring for Heavy Oil. SPE Heavy Oil Conference and Exhibition. Society of Petroleum Engineers. doi:10.2118/184089-MS.
- Przybysz-Jarnut, J. K.; Potters, J. H. H. M.; Lopez, Jorge L.; Araujo, M; Xue, Yuanyi (2016-01-01). "Maximizing VOI of Frequent Seismic Monitoring of Heavy Oil Fields: Case Study at Peace River Pad 31". SPE Heavy Oil Conference and Exhibition. SPE Heavy Oil Conference and Exhibition. Society of Petroleum Engineers. doi:10.2118/184157-MS.
- Ren, Z. B.; Al-Haqqan, H.; Ahmad, F.; Tinnin, J.; Hamilton, A. (December 2016). "3D VSP Surveillance of Thermal Heavy Oil Recovery in Kuwait | SPE". search.spe.org.
- Sydansk, Robert D.; Seright, Randall (2007-05-01). "When and Where Relative Permeability Modification Water-Shutoff Treatments Can Be Successfully Applied". SPE Production & Operations. 22 (2): 236–247. doi:10.2118/99371-PA.
- Shabelansky, Andrey H.; Malcolm, Alison; Fehler, Michael (2015-09-01). "Monitoring viscosity changes from time-lapse seismic attenuation: case study from a heavy oil reservoir" (PDF). Geophysical Prospecting (Submitted manuscript). 63 (5): 1070–1085. Bibcode:2015GeopP..63.1070S. doi:10.1111/1365-2478.12229. ISSN 1365-2478.
- Teng, L; Song, H; Zhang, S; Wu, F; Xu, D; Gong, Y; Jiang, Z; Gao, H; Wang, C (2017-01-01). Investigation on In-Situ Combustion in D66, a Multilayered Heavy Oil Reservoir, Liaohe Oilfield. SPE Latin America and Caribbean Heavy and Extra Heavy Oil Conference. Society of Petroleum Engineers. doi:10.2118/186173-MS.
- Toole, ST; Grist, DM (2003). SPE Reprint Series no.61 Heavy oil recover. Offshore Europe Conf. Petroleum Community Forum.
- Wilson, A. (2014). "Continuous Seismic Reservoir Monitoring of Thermal Enhanced Oil Recovery". Journal of Petroleum Technology. 66 (6): 119–121. doi:10.2118/0614-0119-JPT.
- Jayasekera, AJ; Goodyear, SG. (13 April 2002). Improved hydrocarbon recovery in the United Kingdom Continental Shelf: past, present and future. SPE/DOE Improved Oil Recovery Symposium. Society of Petroleum Engineers.
- Ohms, D; MacLeod, J; Graff, C; Frampton, H; Morgan, JC; Cheung, S; Chang, KT. (2009). Incremental oil success from waterflood sweep improvement in Alaska. SPE Prod. Oper. Vol. 25. pp. 247–254.
- Moulds, TP; Trussell, P; Haseldonck, SA; Carruthers, RA. (6–9 September 2005). Magnus field: reservoir management in a mature field combining waterflood, EOR and new area developments. SPE Offshore Europe Conf. Society of Petroleum Engineers.
- Alusta, Gamal; Mackay, Eric; Fennema, Julian; Collins, Ian (2011-07-19). EOR vs. Infill Well Drilling: How to Make the Choice?. SPE Enhanced Oil Recovery Conference 2011, EORC 2011. Vol. 1. Society of Petroleum Engineers. doi:10.2118/143300-MS.
