= Anders Gullberg =

Swedish scientist and writer

Karl Anders Torbjörn Gullberg (born 1947) is a Swedish social scientist, urban historian, technology historian, and former adjunct professor at the Division of History of Science, Technology and Environment at the KTH Royal Institute of Technology, Stockholm.

Gullberg was the head of Kommittén för Stockholmsforskning (Stockholm Research) and Stockholmia Publishing from 2005–14. He currently works for the Centre for Sustainable Communications at KTH.

Gullberg has published several books and articles, notably City – drömmen om ett nytt hjärta (City – the dream of a new heart), a history and study of the redevelopment of Stockholm's Central Business District 1951–79. He has also published Images of the Future City: Time and space for sustainable development (with Mattias Höjer and Ronny Pettersson), a vision of the sustainable city of the future, and Congestion Taxes in City Traffic: Lessons learnt from the Stockholm Trial (with Karolina Isaksson).

Gullberg has recently launched a vision of an Integrated Information and Payment Platform for solving traffic problems in urban transport.

== Publications in English ==
- 2004 – City building regimes in post-war Stockholm. (with Arne Kaijser).
- 2009 – Congestion taxes in city traffic: lessons learnt from the Stockholm trial. (with Karolina Isaksson, Greger Henriksson and Jonas Eliasson). Lund: Nordic Academic Press.
- 2011 – Images of the future city: time and space for sustainable development. (with Mattias Höjer and Ronny Pettersson). London: Springer.

=== Stockholm CBD Renewal ===
- 1991 – Long Swings, Rent Gaps and Structures of Building Provision. (with Eric Clark)
- 1997 – Power struggles in the making and taking of rent gaps. (with Eric Clark)
- 2014, 1994 – The Stockholm CBD Renewal 1951–1978 Good Business or Planning Disaster? Urbancity.

=== Integrated Information and Payment Platform in Urban Transport ===
- 2012 – Urban transport is a useless service.
- 2012, 2015 – Integrated Information and Payment Platform.
- 2014 – A two minutes vision: An open digital platform in urban transport.
- 2015 – Here is the unused capacity in urban traffic.
- 2015 – Digital platform can eliminate queues, with Anna Kramers. A version of this text was originally published in the Swedish daily newspaper, Dagens Nyheter 12 April.
- 2016 – Letter to the Editor Economist The future of personal transport, Economist January 9, 2016: The driverless, car-sharing road ahead.
- 2016 – Urban traffic without queues. A movie with English subtitles.
