= Ihara zeta function =

Mathematical finite graph-associated function

In mathematics, the Ihara zeta function is a zeta function associated with a finite graph. It closely resembles the Selberg zeta function, and is used to relate closed walks to the spectrum of the adjacency matrix. The Ihara zeta function was first defined by Yasutaka Ihara in the 1960s in the context of discrete subgroups of the two-by-two p-adic special linear group. Jean-Pierre Serre suggested in his book Trees that Ihara's original definition can be reinterpreted graph-theoretically. It was Toshikazu Sunada who put this suggestion into practice in 1985. As observed by Sunada, a regular graph is a Ramanujan graph if and only if its Ihara zeta function satisfies an analogue of the Riemann hypothesis.

== Definition ==
The Ihara zeta function is defined as the analytic continuation of the infinite product

$$\zeta_{G}(u)=\prod_{p}\frac{1}{1-u^{{L}(p)}},$$

where L(p) is the length $L(p)$ of $p$. The product in the definition is taken over all prime closed geodesics $p$ of the graph $G = (V, E)$, where geodesics which differ by a cyclic rotation are considered equal. A closed geodesic $p$ on $G$ (known in graph theory as a "reduced closed walk"; it is not a graph geodesic) is a finite sequence of vertices $p = (v_0, \ldots, v_{k-1})$ such that

$$(v_i, v_{(i+1)\bmod k}) \in E,$$
$$v_i \neq v_{(i+2) \bmod k}.$$

The integer $k$ is the length $L(p)$. The closed geodesic $p$ is prime if it cannot be obtained by repeating a closed geodesic $m$ times, for an integer $m > 1$.

This graph-theoretic formulation is due to Sunada.

== Ihara's formula ==
Ihara (and Sunada in the graph-theoretic setting) showed that for regular graphs the zeta function is a rational function. If $G$ is a $q+1$-regular graph with adjacency matrix $A$ then

$$\zeta_G(u) = \frac{1}{(1-u^2)^{r(G)-1}\det(I - Au + qu^2I)},$$

where $r(G)$ is the circuit rank of $G$. If $G$ is connected and has $n$ vertices, $r(G)-1=(q-1)n/2$.

The Ihara zeta-function is in fact always the reciprocal of a graph polynomial:

$$\zeta_G(u) = \frac{1}{\det (I-Tu)}~,$$

where $T$ is Ki-ichiro Hashimoto's edge adjacency operator. Hyman Bass gave a determinant formula involving the adjacency operator.

== Applications ==
The Ihara zeta function plays an important role in the study of free groups, spectral graph theory, and dynamical systems, especially symbolic dynamics, where the Ihara zeta function is an example of a Ruelle zeta function.
