= Kenneth Brown (mathematician) =

American mathematician

Kenneth S. Brown
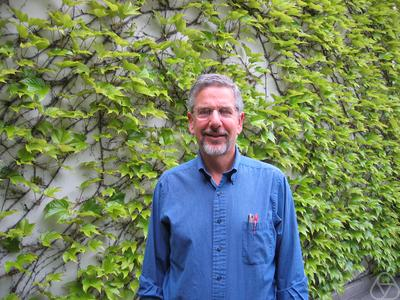
- Kenneth Brown at Oberwolfach in 2004
- Born: 1945 (age 80–81)

Academic background
- Education: Stanford University (AB); Massachusetts Institute of Technology (PhD)
- Thesis: Abstract Homotopy Theory and Generalized Sheaf Cohomology (1971)
- Doctoral advisor: Daniel Quillen

Academic work
- Discipline: Mathematics
- Institutions: Cornell University
- Doctoral students: Susan Hermiller; David Webb

Kenneth Stephen Brown (born 1945) is a professor of mathematics emeritus who spent his career at Cornell University, working in category theory and cohomology theory as well as in buildings. Among other things, he is known for Ken Brown's lemma in the theory of model categories. He is also the author of the book Cohomology of Groups (Graduate Texts in Mathematics 87, Springer, 1982).

Brown grew up in University City, Missouri, outside St. Louis, and graduated from University City High School in 1963. Using a National Merit Scholarship, he attended Stanford University, graduating from there in 1967 with an A.B. degree. Brown earned his Ph.D. in 1971 from the Massachusetts Institute of Technology, under the supervision of Daniel Quillen, with thesis Abstract Homotopy Theory and Generalized Sheaf Cohomology.

Hired by Cornell University in 1971, Brown started as an assistant professor. Courses that Brown taught in his early years there included "Calculus [IV]", "Linear Algebra", and "Algebra and Number Theory". Brown became an associate professor in 1976 and a full professor in 1981. He served as chair of the mathematics department at Cornell beginning in 2002, and concluding in 2006. He also directed the Summer Math Institute in 2009.

He was an invited speaker at the International Congress of Mathematicians in 1978 in Helsinki. In 2012 he became a fellow of the American Mathematical Society.

Known for his teaching, at Cornell Brown received the college-wide Clark Teaching Award and also the Mathematics Department Senior Faculty Award. An October 2010 conference entitled "Approaches to Group Theory" was held in his honor at Cornell. It was organized by his colleagues and former students, and led by the mathematicians Susan Hermiller, John Meier, Karen Vogtmann, and David Webb. Brown became a professor emeritus at Cornell in 2014.

== Selected publications ==
- Cohomology of Groups, Graduate Texts in Mathematics 87, Springer-Verlag, New York, 1982 [reprinted including corrections, 1994]
- Buildings, Springer-Verlag, New York, 1989 [reprinted 1998]
- Buildings: Theory and Applications, Graduate Texts in Mathematics 248, Springer, New York, 2008 [co-author with Peter Abramenko]
