= Vibration of a circular membrane =

Equations of waves in a drumhead-like disc

One of the possible modes of vibration of an idealized circular drum head (mode $u_{12}$ with the notation below). Other possible modes are shown at the bottom of the article.

A two-dimensional elastic membrane under tension can support transverse vibrations. The properties of an idealized drumhead can be modeled by the vibrations of a circular membrane of uniform thickness, attached to a rigid frame. Based on the applied boundary condition, at certain vibration frequencies, its natural frequencies, the surface moves in a characteristic pattern of standing waves. This is called a normal mode. A membrane has an infinite number of these normal modes, starting with a lowest frequency one called the fundamental frequency.

There exist infinitely many ways in which a membrane can vibrate, each depending on the shape of the membrane at some initial time, and the transverse velocity of each point on the membrane at that time. The vibrations of the membrane are given by the solutions of the two-dimensional wave equation with Dirichlet boundary conditions which represent the constraint of the frame. It can be shown that any arbitrarily complex vibration of the membrane can be decomposed into a possibly infinite series of the membrane's normal modes. This is analogous to the decomposition of a time signal into a Fourier series.

The study of vibrations on drums led mathematicians to pose a famous mathematical problem on whether the shape of a drum can be heard, with an answer (it cannot) being given in 1992 in the two-dimensional setting.

== Practical significance ==
Analyzing the vibrating drum head problem explains percussion instruments such as drums and timpani. However, there is also a biological application in the working of the eardrum. From an educational point of view the modes of a two-dimensional object are a convenient way to visually demonstrate the meaning of modes, nodes, antinodes and even quantum numbers. These concepts are important to the understanding of the structure of the atom.

== The problem ==
Consider an open disk $\Omega$ of radius $a$ centered at the origin, which will represent the "still" drum head shape. At any time $t,$ the height of the drum head shape at a point $(x, y)$ in $\Omega$ measured from the "still" drum head shape will be denoted by $u(x, y, t),$ which can take both positive and negative values. Let $\partial \Omega$ denote the boundary of $\Omega,$ that is, the circle of radius $a$ centered at the origin, which represents the rigid frame to which the drum head is attached.

The mathematical equation that governs the vibration of the drum head is the wave equation with fixed boundary conditions,

$$\frac{\partial^2 u}{\partial t^2} = c^2 \left(\frac{\partial^2 u}{\partial x^2}+\frac{\partial^2 u}{\partial y^2}\right) \text{ for }(x, y) \in \Omega \,$$

$$u = 0\text{ on }\partial \Omega.\,$$

Due to the circular geometry of $\Omega$, it will be convenient to use polar coordinates $(r, \theta).$ Then, the above equations are written as

$$\frac{\partial^2 u}{\partial t^2} = c^2 \left(\frac{\partial^2 u}{\partial r^2}+\frac {1}{r}\frac{\partial u}{\partial r}+\frac{1}{r^2}\frac{\partial^2 u}{\partial \theta^2}\right) \text{ for } 0 \le r < a, 0 \le \theta \le 2\pi\,$$

$$u = 0\text{ for } r=a.\,$$

Here, $c$ is a positive constant, which gives the speed at which transverse vibration waves propagate in the membrane. In terms of the physical parameters, the wave speed, c, is given by

$$c = \sqrt{\frac{N_{rr}^*}{\rho h}}$$

where $N_{rr}^*$, is the radial membrane resultant at the membrane boundary ($r = a$), $h$, is the membrane thickness, and $\rho$ is the membrane density. If the membrane has uniform tension, the uniform tension force at a given radius, $r$ may be written

$$F = rN^{r}_{rr}=rN^{r}_{\theta\theta}$$

where $N^{r}_{\theta\theta} = N^{r}_{rr}$ is the membrane resultant in the azimuthal direction.

== The axisymmetric case ==
We will first study the possible modes of vibration of a circular drum head that are axisymmetric (rotationally symmetric around a central axis). Then, the function $u$ does not depend on the angle $\theta,$ and the wave equation simplifies to

$$\frac{\partial^2 u}{\partial t^2} = c^2 \left(\frac{\partial^2 u}{\partial r^2}+\frac {1}{r}\frac{\partial u}{\partial r}\right) .$$

We will look for solutions in separated variables, $u(r, t) = R(r)T(t).$ Substituting this in the equation above and dividing both sides by $c^2R(r)T(t)$ yields

$$\frac{T''(t)}{c^2T(t)} = \frac{1}{R(r)}\left(R''(r) + \frac{1}{r}R'(r)\right).$$

The left-hand side of this equality does not depend on $r,$ and the right-hand side does not depend on $t,$ it follows that both sides must be equal to some constant $K.$ We get separate equations for $T(t)$ and $R(r)$:

$$T''(t) = Kc^2T(t) \,$$
$$rR''(r)+R'(r)-KrR(r)=0.\,$$

The equation for $T(t)$ has solutions which exponentially grow or decay for $K>0,$ are linear or constant for $K=0$ and are periodic for $K<0$. Physically it is expected that a solution to the problem of a vibrating drum head will be oscillatory in time, and this leaves only the third case, $K<0,$ so we choose $K=-\lambda^2$ for convenience. Then, $T(t)$ is a linear combination of sine and cosine functions,

$$T(t)=A\cos c\lambda t + B\sin c \lambda t.\,$$

Turning to the equation for $R(r),$ with the observation that $K=-\lambda^2,$ all solutions of this second-order differential equation are a linear combination of Bessel functions of order 0, since this has the form of modified Bessel's equation:

$$R(r) = c_1 J_0(\lambda r)+ c_2 Y_0(\lambda r).\,$$

The Bessel function $Y_0$ is unbounded for $r\to 0,$ which results in an unphysical solution to the vibrating drum head problem, so the constant $c_2$ must be null. We will also assume $c_1=1,$ as otherwise this constant can be absorbed later into the constants $A$ and $B$ coming from $T(t).$ It follows that

$$R(r) = J_0(\lambda r).$$

The requirement that height $u$ be zero on the boundary of the drum head results in the condition

$$R(a) = J_0(\lambda a) = 0.$$

The Bessel function $J_0$ has an infinite number of positive roots,

$$0< \alpha_{01} < \alpha_{02} < \cdots$$

We get that $\lambda a=\alpha_{0n},$ for $n=1, 2, \dots,$ so

$$R(r) = J_0\left(\frac{\alpha_{0n}}{a}r\right).$$

Therefore, the axisymmetric solutions $u$ of the vibrating drum head problem that can be represented in separated variables are

$$u_{0n}(r, t) = \left(A\cos c\lambda_{0n} t + B\sin  c\lambda_{0n} t\right)J_0\left(\lambda_{0n} r\right)\text{ for }n=1, 2, \dots, \,$$

where $\lambda_{0n} = \alpha_{0n}/a.$

== The general case ==
The general case, when $u$ can also depend on the angle $\theta,$ is treated similarly. We assume a solution in separated variables,

$$u(r, \theta, t) = R(r)\Theta(\theta)T(t).\,$$

Substituting this into the wave equation and separating the variables, gives

$$\frac{T''(t)}{c^2T(t)} = \frac{R''(r)}{R(r)}+\frac{R'(r)}{rR(r)} + \frac{\Theta''(\theta)}{r^2\Theta(\theta)}=K$$

where $K$ is a constant. As before, from the equation for $T(t)$ it follows that $K=-\lambda^2$ with $\lambda>0$ and

$$T(t)=A\cos c\lambda t + B\sin c \lambda t.\,$$

From the equation

$$\frac{R''(r)}{R(r)}+\frac{R'(r)}{rR(r)} + \frac{\Theta''(\theta)}{r^2\Theta(\theta)}=-\lambda^2$$

we obtain, by multiplying both sides by $r^2$ and separating variables, that

$$\lambda^2r^2+\frac{r^2R''(r)}{R(r)}+\frac{rR'(r)}{R(r)}=L$$

and

$$-\frac{\Theta''(\theta)}{\Theta(\theta)}=L,$$

for some constant $L.$ Since $\Theta(\theta)$ is periodic, with period $2\pi,$ $\theta$ being an angular variable, it follows that

$$\Theta(\theta)=C\cos m\theta + D \sin m\theta,\,$$

where $m=0, 1, \dots$ and $C$ and $D$ are some constants. This also implies $L=m^2.$

Going back to the equation for $R(r),$ its solution is a linear combination of Bessel functions $J_m$ and $Y_m.$ With a similar argument as in the previous section, we arrive at

$R(r) = J_m(\lambda_{mn}r),\,$ $m=0, 1, \dots,$ $n=1, 2, \dots,$

where $\lambda_{mn}=\alpha_{mn}/a,$ with $\alpha_{mn}$ the $n$-th positive root of $J_m.$

We showed that all solutions in separated variables of the vibrating drum head problem are of the form

$$u_{mn}(r, \theta, t) = \left(A\cos c\lambda_{mn} t + B\sin  c\lambda_{mn} t\right)J_m\left(\lambda_{mn} r\right)(C\cos m\theta + D \sin m\theta)$$

for $m=0, 1, \dots, n=1, 2, \dots$

== Animations of several vibration modes ==
A number of modes are shown below together with their quantum numbers. The analogous wave functions of the hydrogen atom are also indicated as well as the associated angular frequencies $\omega_{mn}=\lambda_{mn}c=\dfrac{\alpha_{mn}}{a}c=\alpha_{mn}c/a$. The values of $\alpha_{mn}$ are the roots of the Bessel function $J_m$. This is deduced from the boundary condition $\forall \theta \in [0,2\pi], \forall t, \ u_{mn}(r=a, \theta, t) = 0$ which yields $J_m(\lambda_{mn}a) = J_m(\alpha_{mn}) = 0$.

Mode $u_{01}$ (1s) with $\alpha_{01}=2.40483$

Mode $u_{02}$ (2s) with $\alpha_{02}=5.52008$

Mode $u_{03}$ (3s) with $\alpha_{03}=8.65373$
Mode $u_{11}$ (2p) with $\alpha_{11}=3.83171$

Mode $u_{12}$ (3p) with $\alpha_{12}=7.01559$

Mode $u_{13}$ (4p) with $\alpha_{13}=10.1735$
Mode $u_{21}$ (3d) with $\alpha_{21}=5.13562$

Mode $u_{22}$ (4d) with $\alpha_{22}=8.41724$

Mode $u_{23}$ (5d) with $\alpha_{23}=11.6198$

More values of $\alpha_{mn}$ can easily be computed using the following Python code with the SciPy library:

from scipy import special as sc
m = 0  # order of the Bessel function (i.e. angular mode for the circular membrane)
nz = 3  # desired number of roots
alpha_mn = sc.jn_zeros(m, nz)  # outputs nz zeros of Jm

== See also ==
- Vibrating string, the one-dimensional case
- Chladni patterns, an early description of a related phenomenon, in particular with musical instruments; see also cymatics
- Hearing the shape of a drum, characterising the modes with respect to the shape of the membrane
- Atomic orbital, a related quantum-mechanical and three-dimensional problem
