= Carolyn S. Gordon =

American mathematician

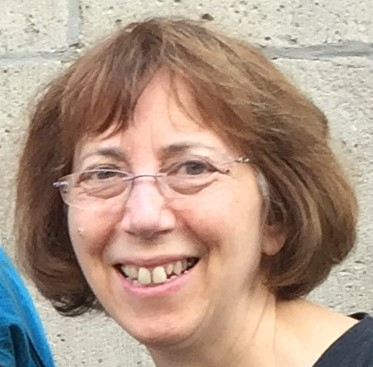
- Gordon in 2016
- Born: December 26, 1950 (age 75); Charleston, West Virginia, U.S.
- Education: Purdue University (BS); Washington University in St. Louis (PhD)
- Known for: Inverse spectral problems, homogeneous spaces
- Awards: Mathematical Association of America Chauvenet Prize; Noether Lecture; Fellow of the American Mathematical Society; Fellow of American Association for the Advancement of Science; Fellow of Association for Women in Mathematics; President of the Association for Women in Mathematics
- Scientific career
- Fields: Mathematics
- Workplaces: Washington University; Lehigh University; Dartmouth College
- Doctoral advisor: Edward Nathan Wilson

Carolyn S. Gordon (born 1950) is an American mathematician who is the Benjamin Cheney Professor of Mathematics at Dartmouth College. She is most well known for giving a negative answer to the question "Can you hear the shape of a drum?" in her work with David Webb and Scott A. Wolpert. She is a Chauvenet Prize winner and a 2010 Noether Lecturer.

== Early life and education ==
Gordon received her Bachelor of Science degree from Purdue University. She entered graduate studies at the Washington University in St. Louis, earning her Doctor of Philosophy in mathematics in 1979. Her doctoral advisor was Edward Nathan Wilson and her thesis was on isometry groups of homogeneous manifolds. She completed a postdoc at Technion – Israel Institute of Technology and held positions at Lehigh University and in the Arts and Sciences at Washington University in St. Louis.

== Career ==
This is the Gordon–Webb–Wolpert example of two flat surfaces with the same spectrum. Notice that both polygons have the same area and perimeter.

Gordon is most well known for her work in isospectral geometry, for which hearing the shape of a drum is the prototypical example. In 1966 Mark Kac asked whether the shape of a drum could be determined by the sound it makes (whether a Riemannian manifold is determined by the spectrum of its Laplace–Beltrami operator). John Milnor observed that a theorem due to Witt implied the existence of a pair of 16-dimensional tori that have the same spectrum but different shapes. However, the problem in two dimensions remained open until 1992, when Gordon, with coauthors Webb and Wolpert, constructed a pair of regions in the Euclidean plane that have different shapes but identical eigenvalues (see figure on right). In further work, Gordon and Webb produced convex isospectral domains in the hyperbolic plane and in Euclidean space.

Gordon has written or coauthored over 30 articles on isospectral geometry including work on isospectral closed Riemannian manifolds with a common Riemannian covering. These isospectral Riemannian manifolds have the same local geometry but different topology. They can be found using the "Sunada method," due to Toshikazu Sunada. In 1993 she found isospectral Riemannian manifolds which are not locally isometric and, since that time, has worked with coauthors to produce a number of other such examples.

Gordon has also worked on projects concerning the homology class, length spectrum (the collection of lengths of all closed geodesics, together with multiplicities) and geodesic flow on isospectral Riemannian manifolds.

== Selected awards and honors ==
In 2001 Gordon and Webb were awarded the Mathematical Association of America Chauvenet Prize for their 1996 American Scientist paper, "You can't hear the shape of a drum". In 1990 she was awarded an AMS Centennial Fellowship by the American Mathematical Society for outstanding early career research. In 1999 Gordon presented an AMS-MAA joint invited address. In 2010 she was selected as a Noether Lecturer. In 2012 she became a fellow of the American Mathematical Society and of the American Association for the Advancement of Science. She was also an AMS Council member at large from 2005 to 2007. In 2017 she was selected as a fellow of the Association for Women in Mathematics in the inaugural class. Gordon was featured in the Women's History Month tribute in the March 2018 edition of the AMS Notices.

== Selected articles ==
- Gordon, Carolyn (2001), "Isospectral Deformations of Metrics on Spheres", Inventiones Mathematicae, 145 (2): 317–331, arXiv:math/0005156, Bibcode:2001InMat.145..317G, doi:10.1007/s002220100150, S2CID 14078869
- Gordon, Carolyn; Webb, David (1996), "You can't hear the shape of a drum", American Scientist, 84 (January–February): 46–55, Bibcode:1996AmSci..84...46G
- Gordon, Carolyn (1994), Isospectral Closed Riemannian Manifolds which are not Locally Isometric II, Contemporary Mathematics, vol. 173, American Mathematical Society, pp. 121–131, doi:10.1090/conm/173/01821, ISBN 9780821851852
- Gordon, Carolyn; Webb, David; Wolpert, Scott (1992), "Isospectral plane domains and surfaces via Riemannian orbifolds", Inventiones Mathematicae, 110: 1–22, Bibcode:1992InMat.110....1G, doi:10.1007/BF01231320, S2CID 122258115
- Gordon, Carolyn; Webb, David L.; Wolpert, Scott (1992), "One Cannot Hear the Shape of a Drum", Bulletin of the American Mathematical Society, 27: 134–138, arXiv:math/9207215, doi:10.1090/S0273-0979-1992-00289-6, S2CID 15950835
- Gordon, Carolyn; Wilson, Edward (1984), "Isospectral deformations of compact solvmanifolds", Journal of Differential Geometry, 19: 241–256, doi:10.4310/jdg/1214438431

== Personal life ==
Gordon is married to David Webb. She cites raising her daughter, Annalisa, as her greatest joy in life.
