= Ken Brown's lemma =

Mathematical concept in homotopy theory

In mathematics, specifically in homotopy theory, Ken Brown's lemma gives a sufficient condition for a functor on a category of fibrant objects to preserve weak equivalences; the sufficient condition is that acyclic fibrations go to weak equivalences. The dual of the statement also holds. The lemma or, more precisely, a result of which the lemma is a corollary, was introduced by Kenneth Brown.

== Proof ==
The lemma follows from the following:

Factorization lemma—Let $f$ be a morphism in a given category of fibrant objects. Then $f$ factorizes as $f = g \circ j$ where

- $g$ is a fibration,
- $j$ admits a retract that is an acyclic fibration.

To see the lemma follows from the above, let $w$ be a weak equivalence and $F$ the given functor. By the factorization lemma, we can write

$$w = g \circ j$$

with an acyclic fibration $r$ such that $r \circ j = \operatorname{id}$. Note $j$ is a weak equivalence since $r$ is. Thus, $g$ is a weak equivalence (thus acyclic fibration) since $w$ is. So, $F(g)$ is a weak equivalence by assumption. Similarly, $F(j)$ is a weak equivalence. Hence, $F(w) = F(g) \circ F(j)$ is a weak equivalence. $\square$

Proof of factorization lemma: Let $f : X \to Y$ be the given morphism. Let

$$e : Y^I \to Y \times Y$$

be the path object fibration; namely, it is obtained by factorizing the diagonal map $\Delta$ as $\Delta = e \circ c$ where $c$ is a weak equivalence.

Then let $\pi : Z \to X \times Y$ be the pull-back of $e$ along $f \times \operatorname{id}$, which is again a fibration. Then by the universal property of the pull-back, we get a map $j : X \to Z$ so that the resulting diagram with $X \overset{f}\to Y \overset{c}\to Y^I$ and $(\operatorname{id}_X, f)$ commutes. Take $g$ to be $Z \overset{\pi}\to X \times Y \overset{p_2}\to Y$, which is a fibration since the projection $p_2$ is the pull-back of the fibration $Y \to$ final object.

As for $j$, let $r$ be $Z \overset{\pi}\to X \times Y \overset{p_1}\to X$, which is again a fibration. Note that $r$ is the pull-back of $q \circ e : Y^I \to Y$, $q$ a projection. Since $e \circ c = \Delta$, we have $q \circ e \circ c = \operatorname{id}$. It follows $q \circ e$ is a weak equivalence (since $c$ is) and thus $r$ is a weak equivalence. $\square$
