= Lawrence Zalcman =

American-Israeli mathematician (1943–2022)

Lawrence Allen Zalcman
- לורנס זלצמן
- Born: June 9, 1943; Kansas City, Missouri, US
- Died: May 31, 2022 (aged 78); Jerusalem, Israel
- Education: Dartmouth College, Massachusetts Institute of Technology
- Known for: Zalcman's Lemma, Zalcman domains, Zalcman functions, Pizzetti-Zalcman formula
- Awards: Chauvenet Prize (1976), Lester R. Ford Award (1975, 1981), Paul R. Halmos – Lester R. Ford Award (2017)
- Scientific career
- Fields: Mathematics
- Workplaces: Bar-Ilan University, University of Maryland, Stanford University
- Thesis: (1968)
- Doctoral advisor: Kenneth Myron Hoffman

Lawrence Allen Zalcman (Hebrew: לורנס זלצמן; June 9, 1943 – May 31, 2022) was a professor (and later a professor emeritus) of Mathematics at Bar-Ilan University in Israel. His research primarily concerned Complex analysis, potential theory, and the relations of these ideas to approximation theory, harmonic analysis, integral geometry and partial differential equations. On top of his scientific achievements, Zalcman received numerous awards for mathematical exposition, including the Chauvenet Prize in 1976, the Lester R. Ford Award in 1975 and 1981, and the Paul R. Halmos – Lester R. Ford Award in 2017. In addition to Bar-Ilan University, Zalcman taught at the University of Maryland and Stanford University in the United States.

== Life and career ==
Zalcman was born in Kansas City, Missouri on June 9, 1943. In 1961, he graduated from Southwest High School in Kansas City, Missouri before continuing his education at Dartmouth College, where he would graduate in 1964. Zalcman went on to receive his Ph.D. from the Massachusetts Institute of Technology in 1968 under the supervision of Kenneth Myron Hoffman. In 2012, Zalcman became a fellow of the American Mathematical Society.

In the theory of normal families, Zalcman's Lemma, which he used as part of his treatment of Bloch's principle, is named after him. Other eponymous honors are Zalcman domains, which play a role in the classification of Riemann surfaces, and Zalcman functions in complex dynamics. In the theory of partial differential equations, the Pizzetti-Zalcman formula is partially named after him.

Lawrence Zalcman died in Jerusalem on May 31, 2022.

== Selected publications ==
- Analytic capacity and rational approximation. Springer Verlag. 1968. ISBN 9783540358251.
- with Peter Lax: Complex proofs of real theorems, American Mathematical Society 2012
