= Kac ring =

Toy model in statistical physics

In statistical mechanics, the Kac ring is a toy model introduced by Mark Kac in 1956 to explain how the second law of thermodynamics emerges from time-symmetric interactions between molecules (see reversibility paradox). Although artificial, the model is notable as a mathematically transparent example of coarse-graining and is used as a didactic tool in non-equilibrium thermodynamics.

== Formulation ==
The Kac ring with $N = 20$ and $M = 4$. The marked points are indicated by red gates placed on edges which connect them to their counterclockwise neighbor.

The Kac ring consists of N equidistant points in a circle. Some of these points are marked. The number of marked points is M, where $0 < 2M < N$. Each point represents a site occupied by a ball, which is black or white. After a unit of time, each ball moves to a neighboring point counterclockwise. Whenever a ball leaves a marked site, it switches color from black to white and vice versa. (If, however, the starting point is not marked, the ball completes its move without changing color.)

An imagined observer can only measure coarse-grained (or macroscopic) quantities: the ratio

$$\mu = \frac{M}{N} < 0.5$$

and the overall color

$$\delta = \frac{W-B}{N},$$

where B, W denote the total number of black and white balls respectively. Without the knowledge of detailed (microscopic) configuration, any distribution of M marks is considered equally likely. This assumption of equiprobability is comparable to Stosszahlansatz, which leads to Boltzmann equation.

== Detailed evolution ==
Let $\eta_k(t)$ denote the color of a ball at point k and time t with a convention

$$\eta_k = \begin{cases}
+1 & \text{ball is white}\\
-1 & \text{ball is black}
\end{cases}.$$

The microscopic dynamics can be mathematically formulated as

$$\eta_k(t) = \epsilon_{k-1} \eta_{k-1}(t-1),$$

where

$$\epsilon_k = \begin{cases}
+1 & \text{unmarked site}\\
-1 & \text{marked site}
\end{cases}$$

and $k-1$ is taken modulo N. In analogy to molecular motion, the system is time-reversible. Indeed, if balls would move clockwise (instead of counterclockwise) and marked points changed color upon entering them (instead of leaving), the motion would be equivalent, except going backward in time. Moreover, the evolution of $\eta_k(t)$ is periodic, where the period is at most $2N$. (After N steps, each ball visits all M marked points and changes color by a factor $(-1)^M$.) Periodicity of the Kac ring is a manifestation of more general Poincaré recurrence.

== Coarse-graining ==
Kac ring evolution for $N = 1000$ and $M = 20$ with logarithmic time scale. Blue line is the approximate mean behavior given by macroscopic model, indicating exponential relaxation to equilibrium. Orange line is an example of evolution given by microscopic description, which features Poincaré recurrence. Orange area is a confidence interval from 10% to 90% quantile (estimated numerically).

Assuming that all balls are initially white,

$$\eta_k(t) = \epsilon_{k-1} \epsilon_{k-2} \cdots \epsilon_{k-t} = (-1)^{X},$$

where $X = X(k,t)$ is the number of times the ball will leave a marked point during its journey. When marked locations are unknown (and all possibilities equally likely), X becomes a random variable. Considering the limit when N approaches infinity but t, i, and μ remain constant, the random variable X converges to the binomial distribution, i.e.:

$$\lim_{N \to \infty} \text{Pr}(X = i) =
\mu^i (1-\mu)^{t-i}
\begin{pmatrix}
t \\
i
\end{pmatrix}
,$$

Hence, the overall color after t steps will be

$$\begin{align}
\lim_{N \to \infty} \langle \delta(t) \rangle &=
\lim_{N \to \infty} \frac{1}{N} \sum_k \langle \eta_k(t) \rangle\\
&= \lim_{N \to \infty} \langle \eta_1(t) \rangle \\
&= \sum_{i=0}^t (-1)^i \mu^i (1-\mu)^{t-i}
\begin{pmatrix}
t \\
i
\end{pmatrix}  \\
&= (1-2\mu)^t
\end{align} .$$

Since $0<1-2\mu<1$ the overall color will, on average, converge monotonically and exponentially to 50% grey (a state that is analogous to thermodynamic equilibrium). An identical result is obtained for a ring rotating clockwise. Consequently, the coarse-grained evolution of the Kac ring is irreversible.

It is also possible to show that the variance approaches zero:

$$\lim_{N \to \infty} \text{Var}(\delta(t)) = 0 .$$

Therefore, when N is huge (of order 10^{23}), the observer has to be extremely lucky (or patient) to detect any significant deviation from the ensemble averaged behavior.

== See also ==
- Ehrenfest model
