= Gasmann =

Gasmann is a surname. Notable people with the surname include:

- Hans Møller Gasmann (1872–1961), Norwegian educator and Scout leader
- Jens Gasmann (1776–1850), Norwegian businessman and politician
- Tull Gasmann (1927–2005), Norwegian alpine skier

== See also ==
- Gasman (disambiguation)
