= Susan Hermiller =

American mathematician

Susan Marie Hermiller is an American mathematician specializing in the computational, combinatorial, and geometric theory of groups. She is a Willa Cather Professor of Mathematics and a former Graduate Chair for Mathematics at the University of Nebraska–Lincoln.

== Education and career ==
Hermiller earned a bachelor's degree in mathematics and physics from Ohio State University in 1984. She went to Cornell University for graduate study in mathematics, earning a master's degree in 1987 and completing her Ph.D. in 1992. Her doctoral advisor was Kenneth Brown, and her dissertation was Rewriting Systems for Coxeter Groups.

After postdoctoral research at the Mathematical Sciences Research Institute and the University of Melbourne, she became an assistant professor of mathematics at New Mexico State University in 1994. She moved to the University of Nebraska–Lincoln in 1999.

In 2021, her joint research with Mark Brittenham disproved the longstanding Bernhard-Jablan conjecture in knot theory, demonstrating that a proposed algorithm for determining the unknotting number of a knot was not viable.

In 2025, the pair gave a counterexample to another long-standing conjecture, showing that the unknotting number is not additive under the connected sum. They proved that the connected sum of the Septoil knot with its mirror image, $7_1 \# \overline{7_1}$, has unknotting number 5, although each individual knot has unknotting number 3.

== Service ==
Hermiller was a founding member of the Committee on Women in Mathematics of the American Mathematical Society, in 2013. She also served as the American Mathematical Society representative on the Joint Committee on Women in the Mathematical Sciences for 2011 through 2013. She was also a former AMS Council member at large.

== Recognition ==
Hermiller became the Willa Cather Professor in 2017. She was included in the 2019 class of fellows of the American Mathematical Society "for contributions to combinatorial and geometric group theory and for service to the profession, particularly in support of underrepresented groups".
