= Spectral geometry =

Field in mathematics

Spectral geometry is a field in mathematics which concerns relationships between geometric structures of domains and manifolds and spectra of canonically defined differential operators. The case of the Laplace–Beltrami operator on a closed Riemannian manifold has been most intensively studied, although other Laplace operators in differential geometry have also been examined. The field concerns itself with two kinds of questions: direct problems and inverse problems.

Inverse problems seek to identify features of the geometry from information about the eigenvalues of the Laplacian. One of the earliest results of this kind was due to Hermann Weyl who used David Hilbert's theory of integral equation in 1911 to show that the volume of a bounded domain in Euclidean space can be determined from the asymptotic behavior of the eigenvalues for the Dirichlet boundary value problem of the Laplace operator. This question is usually expressed as "Can one hear the shape of a drum?", the popular phrase due to Mark Kac. A refinement of Weyl's asymptotic formula obtained by Pleijel and Minakshisundaram produces a series of local spectral invariants involving covariant differentiations of the curvature tensor, which can be used to establish spectral rigidity for a special class of manifolds. However as the example given by John Milnor tells us, the information of eigenvalues is not enough to determine the isometry class of a manifold (see isospectral). A general and systematic method due to Toshikazu Sunada gave rise to a plethora of such examples which clarifies the phenomenon of isospectral manifolds.

Direct problems attempt to infer the behavior of the eigenvalues of a Riemannian manifold from knowledge of the geometry. The solutions to direct problems are typified by the Cheeger inequality which gives a relation between the first positive eigenvalue and an isoperimetric constant (the Cheeger constant). Many versions of the inequality have been established since Cheeger's work (by R. Brooks and P. Buser for instance).

== See also ==
- Isospectral
- Hearing the shape of a drum
