= Gassman =

Gassman is a surname. Notable people with the surname include:

- Alessandro Gassman (born 1965), Italian actor
- David Gassman (born 1949), American politician
- Tedd Gassman (born 1943), American politician
- Vittorio Gassman (1922–2000), Italian theatre and film actor and director
- Paul G. Gassman (1935–1993), American chemist
- Paola Gassman (1945–2024), Italian actress

== See also ==
- Gassman indole synthesis, indole forming reaction
- Gasman (disambiguation)
