= Chauvenet Prize =

Award by the Mathematical Association of America

- Awarded for: Outstanding expository article on a mathematical topic.
- Country: United States
- Presented by: Mathematical Association of America (MAA)
- Reward: US $1,000
- First award: 1925
- Final award: 2024
- Website: maa.org/chauvenet-prizes/

The Chauvenet Prize is an annual award given by the Mathematical Association of America in recognition of an outstanding expository article on a mathematical topic. It consists of a prize of $1,000 and a certificate.

The Chauvenet Prize was the first award established by the Mathematical Association of America. The prize is named in honor of William Chauvenet and was established through a gift from J. L. Coolidge in 1925. A gift from MAA president Walter B. Ford in 1928 allowed the award to be given every three years instead of the originally planned 5 years.

== Winners ==
- 1925 G. A. Bliss
- 1929 T. H. Hildebrandt
- 1932 G. H. Hardy
- 1935 Dunham Jackson
- 1938 G. T. Whyburn
- 1941 Saunders Mac Lane
- 1944 R. H. Cameron
- 1947 Paul Halmos
- 1950 Mark Kac
- 1953 E. J. McShane
- 1956 Richard H. Bruck
- 1960 Cornelius Lanczos
- 1963 Philip J. Davis
- 1964 Leon Henkin
- 1965 Jack K. Hale & Joseph P. LaSalle
- 1967 Guido Weiss
- 1968 Mark Kac
- 1970 Shiing Shen Chern
- 1971 Norman Levinson
- 1972 Jean Francois Treves
- 1973 Carl D. Olds
- 1974 Peter D. Lax
- 1975 Martin Davis and Reuben Hersh
- 1976 Lawrence Zalcman
- 1977 W. Gilbert Strang
- 1978 Shreeram S. Abhyankar
- 1979 Neil J. A. Sloane
- 1980 Heinz Bauer
- 1981 Kenneth I. Gross
- 1982 No award given.
- 1983 No award given.
- 1984 R. Arthur Knoebel
- 1985 Carl Pomerance
- 1986 George Miel
- 1987 James H. Wilkinson
- 1988 Steve Smale
- 1989 Jacob Korevaar
- 1990 David Allen Hoffman
- 1991 W. B. Raymond Lickorish and Kenneth C. Millett
- 1992 Steven G. Krantz
- 1993 David H. Bailey, Jonathan M. Borwein and Peter B. Borwein
- 1994 Barry Mazur
- 1995 Donald G. Saari
- 1996 Joan Birman
- 1997 Tom Hawkins
- 1998 Alan Edelman and Eric Kostlan
- 1999 Michael I. Rosen
- 2000 Don Zagier
- 2001 Carolyn S. Gordon and David L. Webb
- 2002 Ellen Gethner, Stan Wagon, and Brian Wick
- 2003 Thomas C. Hales
- 2004 Edward B. Burger
- 2005 John Stillwell
- 2006 Florian Pfender & Günter M. Ziegler
- 2007 Andrew J. Simoson
- 2008 Andrew Granville
- 2009 Harold P. Boas
- 2010 Brian J. McCartin
- 2011 Bjorn Poonen
- 2012 Dennis DeTurck, Herman Gluck, Daniel Pomerleano & David Shea Vela-Vick
- 2013 Robert Ghrist
- 2014 Ravi Vakil
- 2015 Dana Mackenzie
- 2016 Susan Marshall & Donald R. Smith
- 2017 Mark Schilling
- 2018 Daniel J. Velleman
- 2019 Tom Leinster
- 2020 Vladimir Pozdnyakov, J. Michael Steele
- 2021 Travis Kowalski
- 2022 William Dunham, Ezra Brown & Matthew Crawford
- 2023 Kimmo Eriksson, Jonas Eliasson
- 2024 Jeffrey Witmer

Source: Mathematical Association of America

== See also ==
- List of mathematics awards
