= Gassmann triple =

In mathematics, a Gassmann triple (or Gassmann-Sunada triple) is a group G together with two faithful actions on sets X and Y, such that X and Y are not isomorphic as G-sets but every element of G has the same number of fixed points on X and Y. They were introduced by Fritz Gassmann in 1926.

== Applications ==
Gassmann triples have been used to construct examples of pairs of mathematical objects with the same invariants that are not isomorphic, including arithmetically equivalent number fields and isospectral graphs and isospectral Riemannian manifolds.

== Examples ==
The Fano plane. The two sets of the Gassmann triple are the 7 points and the 7 lines.

The simple group G = SL_{3}(F_{2}) of order 168 acts on the projective plane of order 2, and the actions on the 7 points and 7 lines give a Gassmann triple.
