= Fritz Gassmann =

Swiss mathematician and geophysicist (1899–1990)

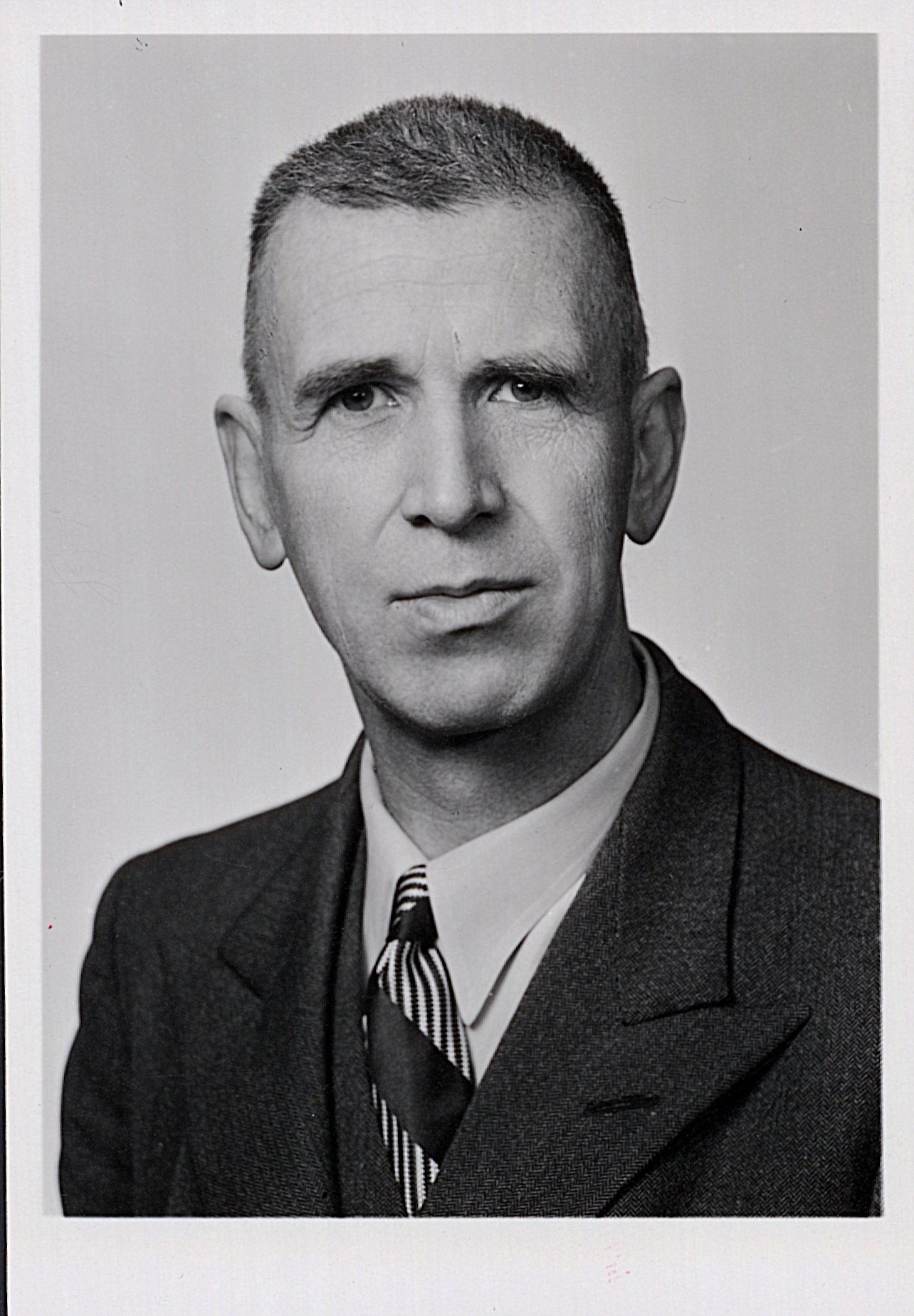
- Born: 1899
- Died: 1990 (aged 90–91)
- Education: ETH Zurich
- Known for: Gassmann triple, Gassmann's equation
- Scientific career
- Fields: Mathematics, Geophysics
- Workplaces: ETH Zurich
- Doctoral advisor: George Pólya, Hermann Weyl

Fritz Gassmann (1899–1990) was a Swiss mathematician and geophysicist.

== Life ==
His Ph.D. advisors at ETH Zurich were George Pólya and Hermann Weyl. He was a geophysics professor at the ETH Zurich.

== Legacy ==
Gassmann is the eponym for the Gassmann triple and Gassmann's equation.

== Selected publications ==
- Gassmann, Fritz (1951). Über die Elastizität poröser Medien. Viertel. Naturforsch. Ges. Zürich, 96, 1 – 23. (English translation available as pdf here).
- Gassmann, Fritz (1951). "Elastic waves through a packing of spheres". Geophysics. 16 (4): 673–685. Bibcode:1951Geop...16..673G. doi:10.1190/1.1437718.
- Gassmann, Fritz (1926), "Bemerkungen zur vorstehenden Arbeit von Hurwitz (Über Beziehungen zwischen den Primidealen eines algebraischen Körpers und den Substitutionen seiner Gruppe)", Mathematische Zeitschrift, 25, Springer Berlin / Heidelberg: 665–675, doi:10.1007/BF01283860, ISSN 0025-5874, S2CID 119971823
