= Gassmann's equation =

Gassmann's equations are a set of two equations describing the isotropic elastic constants of an ensemble consisting of an isotropic, statistically homogeneous rock with a fully connected pore space, saturated by a compressible fluid at pressure equilibrium.

First published in German by Fritz Gassmann, the original work was only later translated into English, long after the adoption of the equations in standard geophysical practice.

Gassmann's equations remain the most common way of performing fluid substitution—predicting the elastic behaviour of a porous medium under a saturant different to the one in the rock as measured.

== Procedure ==
These formulations are from Avseth et al. (2006).

Given an initial set of velocities and densities, $V_{P}^{(1)}$, $V_{S}^{(1)}$, and $\rho ^{(1)}$ corresponding to a rock with an initial set of fluids, you can compute the velocities and densities of the rock with another set of fluid. Often these velocities are measured from well logs, but might also come from a theoretical model.

Step 1: Extract the dynamic bulk and shear moduli from $V_\mathrm{P}^{(1)}$, $V_\mathrm{S}^{(1)}$, and $\rho ^{(1)}$:

$$K_\mathrm{sat}^{(1)} = \rho \left ((V_\mathrm{P}^{(1)})^{2}-\frac{4}{3}(V_\mathrm{S}^{(1)})^{2} \right)$$

$$\mu_\mathrm{sat}^{(1)} = \rho (V_\mathrm{S}^{(1)})^{2}$$

Step 2: Apply Gassmann's relation, of the following form, to transform the saturated bulk modulus:

$$\frac{K_\mathrm{sat}^{(2)}}{K_\mathrm{mineral}-K_\mathrm{sat}^{(2)}}-\frac{K_\mathrm{fluid}^{(2)}}{\phi (K_\mathrm{mineral}-K_\mathrm{fluid}^{(2)})}=\frac{K_\mathrm{sat}^{(1)}}{K_\mathrm{mineral}-K_\mathrm{sat}^{(1)}}-\frac{K_\mathrm{fluid}^{(1)}}{\phi (K_\mathrm{mineral}-K_\mathrm{fluid}^{(1)})}$$

where $K_\mathrm{sat}^{(1)}$ and $K_\mathrm{sat}^{(2)}$ are the rock bulk moduli saturated with fluid 1 and fluid 2, $K_\mathrm{fluid}^{(1)}$ and $K_\mathrm{fluid}^{(2)}$ are the bulk moduli of the fluids themselves, and $\phi$ is the rock's porosity.

Step 3: Leave the shear modulus unchanged (rigidity is independent of fluid type):

$$\mu_\mathrm{sat}^{(2)}=\mu_\mathrm{sat}^{(1)}$$

Step 4: Correct the bulk density for the change in fluid:

$$\rho^{(2)}= \rho^{(1)}+\phi (\rho_\mathrm{fluid}^{(2)} -\rho_\mathrm{fluid}^{(1)})$$

Step 5: recompute the fluid substituted velocities

$$V_\mathrm{P}^{(2)}=\sqrt \frac{K_\mathrm{sat}^{(2)}+\frac{4}{3} \mu_\mathrm{sat}^{(2)}}{\rho^{(2)}}$$

$$V_\mathrm{S}^{(2)} = \sqrt \frac{\mu_\mathrm{sat}^{(2)}}{\rho^{(2)}}$$

== Rearranging for K_{sat} ==
Given

$$\frac{K_\mathrm{sat}^{(2)}}{K_\mathrm{mineral}-K_\mathrm{sat}^{(2)}}-\frac{K_\mathrm{fluid}^{(2)}}{\phi (K_\mathrm{mineral}-K_\mathrm{fluid}^{(2)})}=\frac{K_\mathrm{sat}^{(1)}}{K_\mathrm{mineral}-K_\mathrm{sat}^{(1)}}-\frac{K_\mathrm{fluid}^{(1)}}{\phi (K_\mathrm{mineral}-K_\mathrm{fluid}^{(1)})}$$

Let

$$S = \frac{K_\mathrm{sat}^{(1)}}{K_\mathrm{mineral}-K_\mathrm{sat}^{(1)}}$$

and

$$F_1 = \frac{K_\mathrm{fluid}^{(1)}}{\phi (K_\mathrm{mineral}-K_\mathrm{fluid}^{(1)})}\ \ \ \  F_2 = \frac{K_\mathrm{fluid}^{(2)}}{\phi (K_\mathrm{mineral}-K_\mathrm{fluid}^{(2)})}$$

then

$$K_\mathrm{sat}^{(2)} = \frac{K_\mathrm{mineral}}{\frac{1}{S-F_1+F_2} + 1}$$

Or, expanded

$$K_\mathrm{sat}^{(2)} = \frac{K_\mathrm{mineral}}{ \left[ {\frac{K_\mathrm{sat}^{(1)}}{K_\mathrm{mineral}-K_\mathrm{sat}^{(1)}}-\frac{K_\mathrm{fluid}^{(1)}}{\phi (K_\mathrm{mineral}-K_\mathrm{fluid}^{(1)})}+\frac{K_\mathrm{fluid}^{(2)}}{\phi (K_\mathrm{mineral}-K_\mathrm{fluid}^{(2)})}} \right]^{-1} + 1}$$

A special case of particular interest is that with fluid 1 having negligible bulk modulus, $K_\mathrm{fluid}^{(1)}\cong0$, so that the rock, saturated with this fluid, has the bulk modulus of its empty framework, $K_\mathrm{sat}^{(1)}=K_\mathrm{frame}$ . This is the case treated by Gassmann. In modern notation:

$K_\mathrm{sat}^{(2)}=K_\mathrm{frame}+\frac{(1-K_\mathrm{frame}/K_\mathrm{mineral})^2}{\phi(1/K_\mathrm{fluid}^{(2)}-1/K_\mathrm{mineral})+(1-K_\mathrm{frame}/K_\mathrm{mineral})/K_\mathrm{mineral}}$

== Assumptions ==
=== The porous rock is elastically isotropic. ===
Further, the porosity and the solid have stationary statistics of microgeometry.

=== The load-induced pore pressure is homogeneous and identical in all pores. ===
This assumption implies that shear modulus of the saturated rock is the same as the shear modulus of the dry rock, $\mu_\mathrm{sat}= \mu_\mathrm{dry}$.

=== The porosity does not change with different saturating fluids. ===
Gassmann fluid substitution requires that the porosity remain constant. The assumption being that, all other things being equal, different saturating fluids should not affect the porosity of the rock. This does not take into account diagenetic processes, such as cementation or dissolution, that vary with changing geochemical conditions in the pores. For example, quartz cement is more likely to precipitate in water-filled pores than it is in hydrocarbon-filled ones (Worden and Morad, 2000). So the same rock may have different porosity in different locations due to the local water saturation.

=== Frequency effects are negligible in the measurements. ===
Gassmann's equations are an application (subject however to the criticism below) of the low-frequency limit of Biot's more general equations of motion for poroelastic materials, although he did not consider this specific application. At seismic frequencies (10–100 Hz), the error in using Gassmann's equation may be negligible, for rocks with sufficient permeability. (For example, this might not be true for shales.)

However, when constraining the necessary parameters with sonic measurements at logging frequencies (~20 kHz), this assumption may be violated. A better option, yet more computationally intense, would be to use Biot's frequency-dependent equation to calculate the fluid substitution effects. If the output from this process will be integrated with seismic data, the obtained elastic parameters must also be corrected for dispersion effects.

=== The rock frame is not altered by the saturating fluid. ===
Gassmann's equations assumes no chemical interactions between the fluids and the solid.

== Criticism ==
Despite the long history, cited above, of acceptance of this result as standard practice in geophysics, in 2023 a logical error was discovered in Gassmann's original derivation. The correct result had earlier been found by Brown and Korringa; it contains an additional material parameter. (Not detecting the error by Gassmann, they mis-interpreted the difference as due to their relaxation of Gassmann's assumption of a single isotropic mineral; this mis-interpretation has been continued in the standard practice.) Their correct result for the special case of negligible fluid 1 bulk modulus (cited above) is:

$K_\mathrm{sat}^{(2)}=K_\mathrm{frame}+\frac{(1-K_\mathrm{frame}/K_\mathrm{Mean})^2}{\phi(1/K_\mathrm{fluid}^{(2)}-1/K_\mathrm{OvrlSld})+1/K_\mathrm{OvrlSld}-K_\mathrm{frame}/K_\mathrm{Mean}^2}$

where $K_\mathrm{Mean}$ is the "Mean" bulk modulus, and $K_\mathrm{OvrlSld}$ is the "Overall" bulk modulus of the inhomogeneous, anisotropic solid, a quantity which depends on its microgeometry as well as its composition. Note that in the special case that $K_\mathrm{Mean}$ = $K_\mathrm{OvrlSld}$ , this result reduces to Gassmann's result above, whether the solid is uniform or not.

Because experimental data on $K_\mathrm{Mean}$ is sparse, this new understanding substantially complicates the interpretation of seismic data in terms of subsurface fluids.
