= Gasman (surname) =

Gasman is a surname. Notable people with the surname include:

- David Gasman (born 1960), American actor, voice artist, director and translator
- Ira Gasman (c. 1942–2018), American playwright, lyricist and newspaper columnist
- Marybeth Gasman, American professor of education
