= Jonas Eliasson =

Swedish professor and transportation specialist

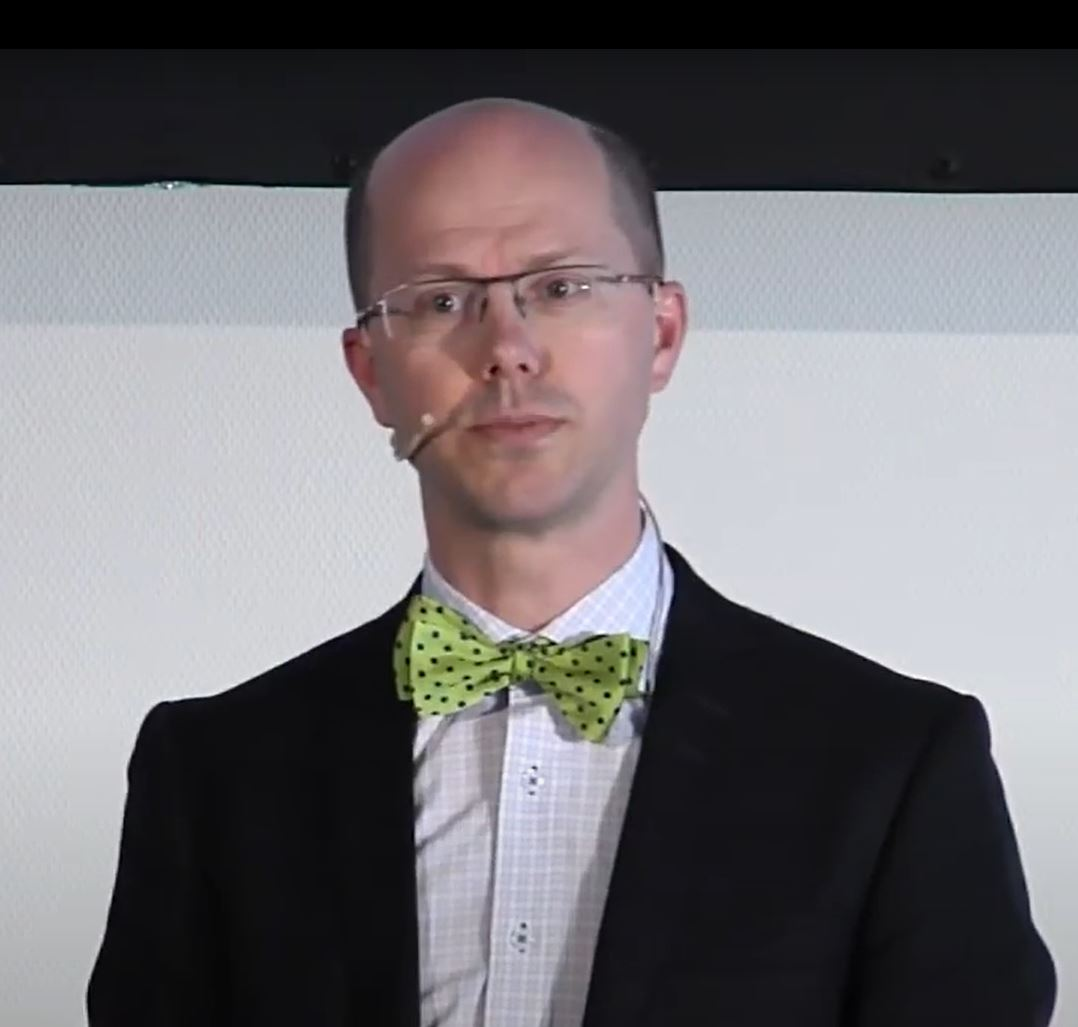
- Jonas Eliasson at TEDxKTH 2012
- Born: Jonas Eliasson; February 3, 1969 (age 56); Kristinehamn, Sweden
- Occupation: professor
- Parent: Ingemar Eliasson
- Website: home page

Jonas Eliasson (born 3 February 1969) is a Swedish professor, transportation specialist and former director of the transport administration in the city of Stockholm.

== Biography ==
Jonas Eliasson was born on February 3, 1969, to Ingemar Eliasson, a former government minister and county governor.

== Education and career ==
Eliasson was a professor of transport system analysis at the KTH Royal Institute of Technology, Stockholm from 2007 until 2016. He was actively involved in the discussions on traffic planning in several large cities in Sweden and abroad. He has been working with road congestion pricing and cost benefit analysis.

He has been a member of the Royal Swedish Academy of Engineering Sciences since 2009.

Eliasson was the director of the transport administration in the city of Stockholm from 2016 until early 2019 and is a professor in transport systems at Linköping University. From November 2019, Eliasson is the goal director for accessibility at the Swedish Transport Administration.

In 2023 he was awarded the Chauvenet Prize of the MAA (jointly with Kimmo Eriksson).
