= Michel Lapidus =

Moroccan-born French-American mathematician

- Born: Casablanca, Morocco
- Education: Pierre and Marie Curie University
- Occupation: Mathematician

Michel Lapidus is a Moroccan-born French-American mathematician. He was a distinguished professor in the department of mathematics at the University of California, Riverside.

In 2000, Lapidus was named a fellow of the American Association for the Advancement of Science.
