= Gasman, Iran =

Gasman گسمن
- Village
- Interactive map of Gasman
- Country: Iran
- Province: Hormozgan
- County: Minab
- Bakhsh: Central
- Rural District: Karian

Population (2006)
  - Total: 456
- Time zone: UTC+3:30 (IRST)
  - Summer (DST): UTC+4:30 (IRDT)

Gasman (Persian: گسمن) is a village in Karian Rural District, in the Central District of Minab County, Hormozgan Province, Iran. At the 2006 census, its population was 456, in 86 families.
