= Gasman =

Gasman may refer to:

- One who works for a gas company, reading gas meters
- Gasman (surname)
- Gasman, a character in the Maximum Ride book series
- Gasman, a 1997 short film directed by Lynne Ramsay
- Gasman, Iran
- The Gasman, a 1941 German comedy film

== See also ==
- Milkman
- Dustman
- Postman
