= Scott A. Wolpert =

American mathematician

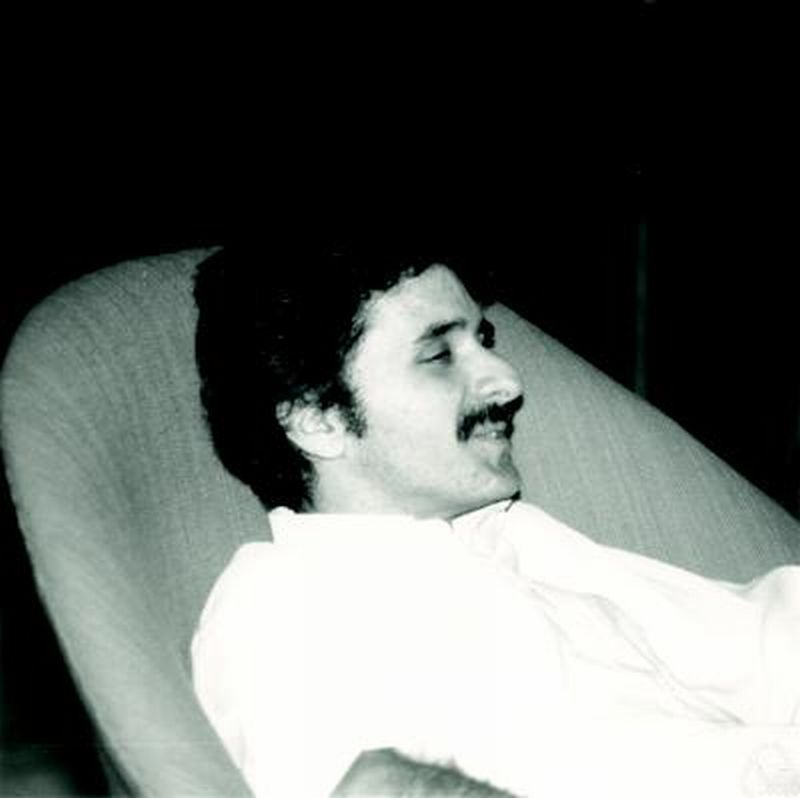
Scott Wolpert at Oberwolfach in 1987

Scott A. Wolpert is an American mathematician specializing in geometry. He is a professor emeritus at the University of Maryland.

Wolpert received his Ph.D. from Stanford University in 1976.

In 1986 he was an Invited Speaker at the International Congresses of Mathematicians in Berkeley, California. In 2012, Wolpert became a fellow of the American Mathematical Society.

== Publications ==
- Wolpert, Scott A. (1986), "Chern forms and the Riemann tensor for the moduli space of curves", Inventiones Mathematicae, 85 (1): 119–145, doi:10.1007/BF01388794, MR 0842050, S2CID 120164269
- Gordon, Carolyn; Webb, David; Wolpert, Scott (1992), "Isospectral plane domains and surfaces via Riemannian orbifolds", Inventiones Mathematicae, 110: 1–22, doi:10.1007/BF01231320, S2CID 122258115
- Gordon, Carolyn; Webb, David L.; Wolpert, Scott (1992), "One Cannot Hear the Shape of a Drum", Bulletin of the American Mathematical Society, 27: 134–138, arXiv:math/9207215, doi:10.1090/S0273-0979-1992-00289-6, S2CID 15950835
