= David Webb (mathematician) =

American mathematician

David Webb is an American mathematician known for his work on hearing the shape of a drum.

Webb attended Cornell University, where he received his PhD in 1983 under the supervision of Kenneth Stephen Brown. He is currently a professor of mathematics at Dartmouth College in Hanover, New Hampshire.

In 2001 Webb and co-author Carolyn S. Gordon were awarded the Mathematical Association of America Chauvenet Prize for their 1996 American Scientist paper, "You can't hear the shape of a drum".
