= Mark Kac =

Polish-American Mathematician (1914–1984)

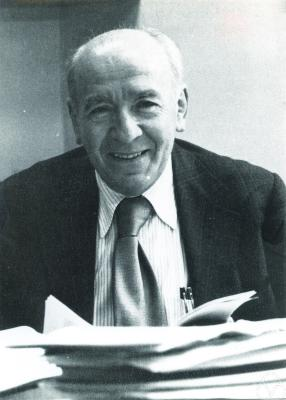
- Born: August 3, 1914; Krzemieniec, Russian Empire (now Ukraine)
- Died: October 26, 1984 (aged 70); California, U.S.
- Citizenship: Poland, USA
- Education: Lwów University
- Known for: Feynman–Kac formula Erdős–Kac theorem Kac–Bernstein theorem Kac–van Moerbeke lattice Kac's lemma Kac process Kac ring Probabilistic number theory
- Awards: Chauvenet Prize (1950, 1968); John von Neumann Prize (1961); Gibbs Lecture (1967); Birkhoff Prize (1978)
- Scientific career
- Fields: Mathematics
- Workplaces: Cornell University; Rockefeller University; University of Southern California
- Doctoral advisor: Hugo Steinhaus
- Doctoral students: Harry Kesten; William LeVeque; William Newcomb; Lonnie Cross; Daniel B. Ray; Murray Rosenblatt; Daniel Stroock

Mark Kac (/kɑːts/ KAHTS; Polish: Marek Kac; August 3, 1914 – October 26, 1984) was a Polish-American mathematician. His main interest was probability theory. His question, "Can one hear the shape of a drum?" set off research into spectral geometry, the idea of understanding the extent to which the spectrum allows one to read back the geometry. In the end, the answer was generally "No," although certain shapes, such as a circular drum, can be inferred from the spectrum of the Laplacian.

== Early life and education ==
He was born to a Polish-Jewish family; their town, Kremenets (Polish: "Krzemieniec"), changed hands from the Russian Empire (by then Soviet Ukraine) to Poland after the Peace of Riga, when Kac was a child.

Kac completed his Ph.D. in mathematics at the Polish University of Lwów in 1937 under the direction of Hugo Steinhaus. While there, he was a member of the Lwów School of Mathematics.

After receiving his degree, he began to look for a position abroad, and in 1938 was granted a scholarship from the Parnas Foundation, which enabled him to go work in the United States. He arrived in New York City in November 1938.

With the onset of World War II in Europe, Kac was able to stay in the United States, while his parents and brother, who had remained in Kremenets, were murdered by the Nazis in mass executions in August 1942.

== Career ==
=== Cornell University ===
From 1939 to 1961, Kac taught at Cornell University, an Ivy League university in Ithaca, New York, where he was first an instructor. In 1943, he was appointed an assistant professor, and he became a full professor in 1947.

While a professor at Cornell, he became a naturalized US citizen in 1943. From 1943 to 1945, he also worked with George Uhlenbeck at the MIT Radiation Laboratory. During the 1951–1952 academic year, Kac was on sabbatical at the Institute for Advanced Study.

In 1952, Kac, with Theodore H. Berlin, introduced the spherical model of a ferromagnet, a variant of the Ising model, and, with J. C. Ward, found an exact solution of the Ising model using a combinatorial method.

In 1956, he introduced a simplified mathematical model known as the Kac ring, which features the emergence of macroscopic irreversibility from completely time-symmetric microscopic laws. Using the model as an analogy to molecular motion, he provided an explanation for Loschmidt's paradox.

=== Rockefeller University ===
In 1961, Kac left Cornell and went to The Rockefeller University in New York City.

He worked with George Uhlenbeck and P. C. Hemmer on the mathematics of a van der Waals gas. After twenty years at Rockefeller, he moved to the University of Southern California where he spent the rest of his career.

In his 1966 article Can one hear the shape of the drum, Kac asked whether the geometric shape of a drum is uniquely defined by its sound. The answer was negative, meaning two different resonators can have identical set of eigenfrequencies.

=== Human rights ===
Kac was the co-chair of the Committee of Concerned Scientists. He co-authored a letter which publicized the case of the scientist Vladimir Samuilovich Kislik and a letter which publicized the case of the applied mathematician Yosif Begun.

== Awards and honors ==
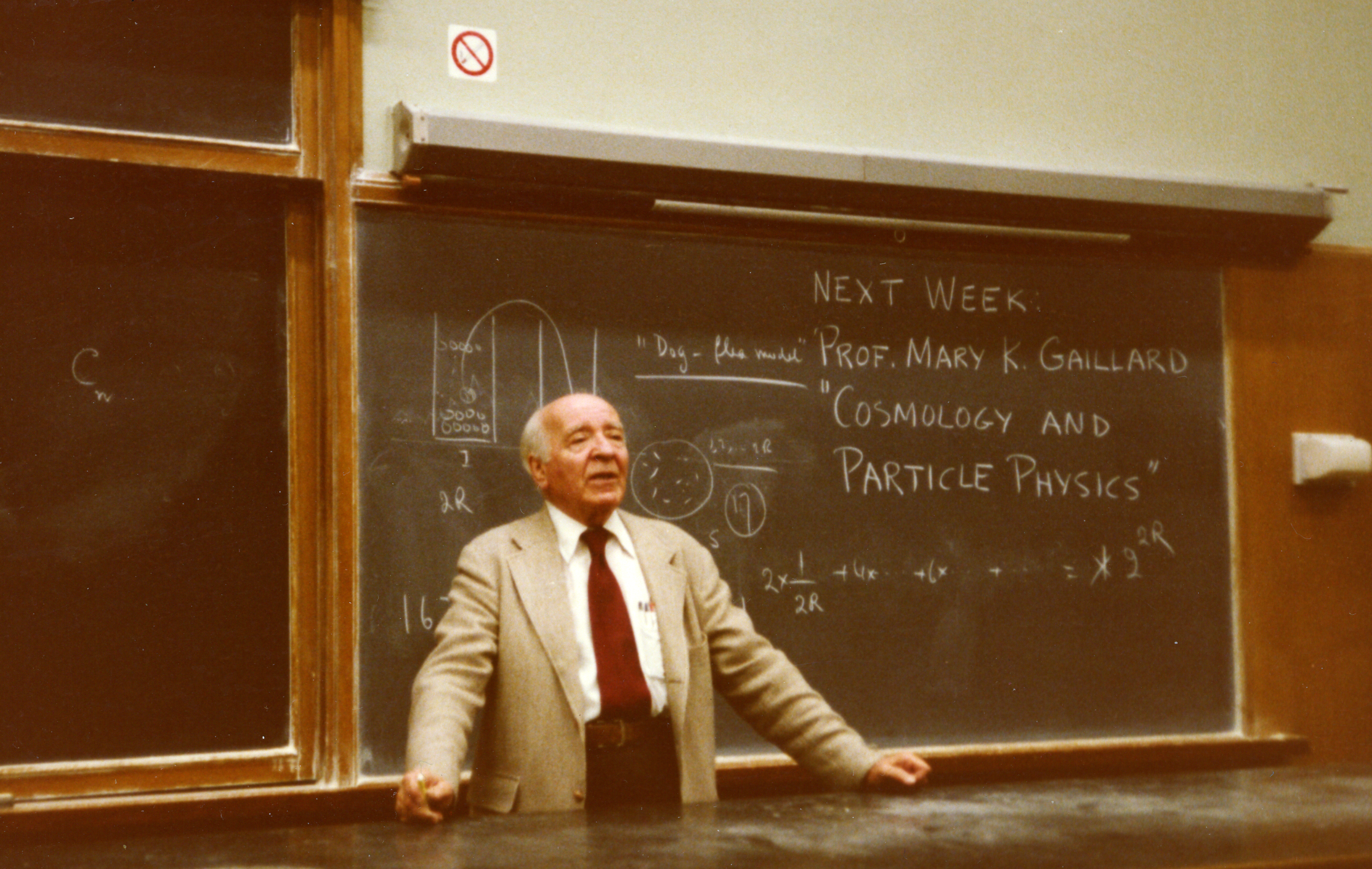
Mark Kac lecturing

- 1950 — Chauvenet Prize for 1947 expository article
- 1959 – member of the American Academy of Arts and Sciences
- 1965 – member of the National Academy of Sciences
- 1968 – Chauvenet Prize (and 1967 Lester R. Ford Award) for 1966 expository article
- 1969 – member of the American Philosophical Society
- 1971 – Solvay Lecturer at Brussels
- 1980 – Fermi Lecturer at the Scuola Normale, Pisa

== Books ==
- Mark Kac and Stanislaw Ulam: Mathematics and Logic: Retrospect and Prospects, Praeger, New York (1968) 1992 Dover paperback reprint. ISBN 0-486-67085-6
- Mark Kac, Statistical Independence in Probability, Analysis and Number Theory, Carus Mathematical Monographs, Mathematical Association of America, 1959.
- Mark Kac, Probability and related topics in the physical sciences. 1959 (with contributions by Uhlenbeck on the Boltzmann equation, Hibbs on quantum mechanics, and van der Pol on finite difference analogues of the wave and potential equations, Boulder Seminar 1957).
- Mark Kac, Enigmas of Chance: An Autobiography, Harper and Row, New York, 1985. Sloan Foundation Series. Published posthumously with a memoriam note by Gian-Carlo Rota. ISBN 0-06-015433-0
