= Guillemin =

The surname Guillemin can refer to:

- Amédée Guillemin (1826–1893), French science author and journalist
- Amédée Henri Guillemin (1860–1941), French general
- Ernst Guillemin (1898–1970), American electrical engineer and computer scientist
- Francisco Romano Guillemin (1884–1950), Mexican painter
- Jean Baptiste Antoine Guillemin (1796–1842), French botanist
- Jean-Philippe Guillemin (born 1972), French computer programmer and musician
- Jeanne Guillemin (1943–2019), American medical anthropologist
- Karen Guillemin, American microbiologist
- Philippe François Zéphirin Guillemin (1814–1886), French Roman Catholic bishop
- Robert Charles Guillemin (1939–2015), American ephemeral artist known as Sidewalk Sam
- Roger Guillemin (1924–2024), French-American neurologist and Nobel laureate in medicine
- Victor Guillemin (born 1937), American mathematician, father of Karen

== See also ==
- Guillemin coupling
- Guillemain
