= Museum of the American Revolution =

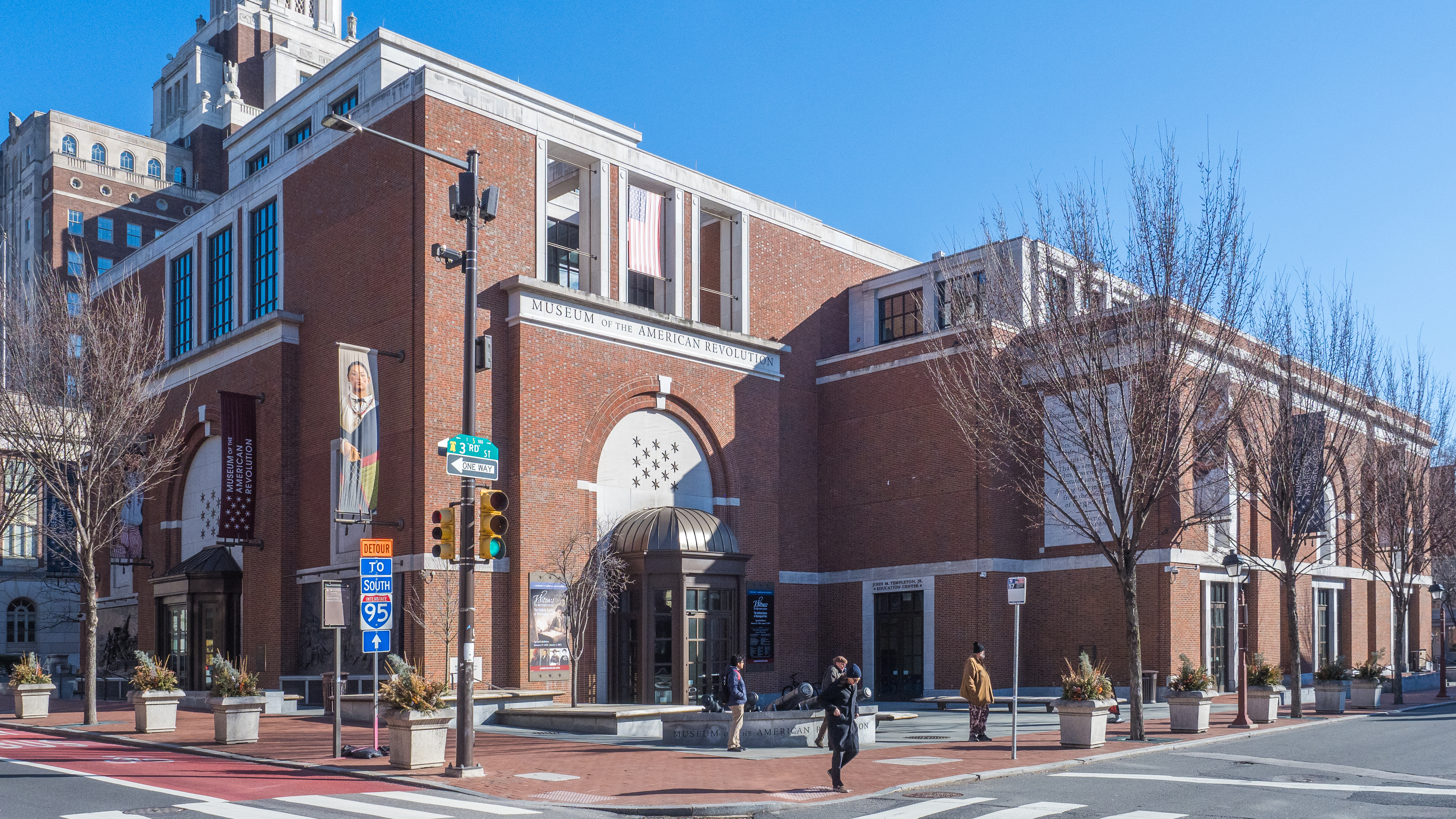
- Museum of the American Revolution in Philadelphia
- Established: 2000; April 19, 2017
- Location: 101 S. Third St., Philadelphia, Pennsylvania, U.S.
- Coordinates: 39.9484°N 75.1458°W
- Type: History museum
- Collection size: 3,000
- President: Dr. R. Scott Stephenson
- Public transit access: SEPTA bus: 21, 42, 57; Philly PHLASH, 2nd Street station
- Website: www.amrevmuseum.org

The Museum of the American Revolution, formerly The American Revolution Center, is a museum in Philadelphia, Pennsylvania dedicated to telling the story of the American Revolution. The museum was opened to the public on April 19, 2017, the 242nd anniversary of the Battles of Lexington and Concord, some of the battles of the American Revolutionary War, on April 19, 1775.

The museum is located at 101 South Third St. in Philadelphia, the city that served as the revolutionary capital during America's founding. The site is across the street from the First Bank of the United States and two blocks from Independence Hall, the National Constitution Center, Second Bank of the United States, American Philosophical Society, Carpenters' Hall, and the Liberty Bell.

== Overview ==
The museum owns a collection of several thousand objects including artwork and sculpture, textiles and weapons, manuscripts, and rare books. Permanent and special exhibition galleries, theaters and large-scale tableaux portray the individuals and events and engage people in the history and continuing relevance of the American Revolution.

Philadelphia area media entrepreneur and philanthropist Gerry Lenfest served as chairman of the board of directors from 2005 until 2016 and was instrumental in launching the museum in 2017. Dr. R. Scott Stephenson was named president and CEO in November 2018. Morris W. Offit serves as the museum's current chairman.

=== Design and construction ===
The building was designed by Robert A.M. Stern Architects (RAMSA), and on June 12, 2012, RAMSA partner and Driehaus Prize winner Robert A. M. Stern unveiled designs for the permanent location. Groundbreaking for the museum occurred in fall 2014.

The museum rises three stories above the street and, with a full basement, encompasses 118,000 total square feet, with 32,000 dedicated to exhibits and interpretive spaces. The first floor includes a museum shop and the Cross Keys Café which opens to the sidewalk. The first floor interior is organized around a skylit central interior court and features a cross-vaulted ticketing lobby, a multi-use theater and a changing exhibition gallery. The second floor features 18,000 square feet of galleries and a theater dedicated to the exhibition of George Washington's marquee tent.

The museum's third floor offers rooms for events and two terraces overlooking the First Bank of the United States, Independence National Historical Park, and the Philadelphia skyline beyond. The museum is seeking Leadership in Energy and Environmental Design (LEED) Silver certification.

=== Outdoor plaza ===
The museum's outdoor plaza opened on September 25, 2016. It is accessible to both museum visitors and to passersby, and features dramatic installations of Revolutionary War artifacts, bronze sculpture, shaded seating, and seasonal café seating.

=== Reception on opening ===
When the museum opened to the public on April 19, 2017, professional historians praised its in-depth and accessible account of the revolution's warfare, social milieu, and ongoing legacy. Jennifer Schuessler for The New York Times commended the museum's treatment of the revolution's complicated legacy and its focus on the role of the common man. Edward Rothstein for The Wall Street Journal penned a more mixed review, appreciating the museum's historical strength but faulting it for "de-sacralizing" the revolution. George Will for The National Review lauded the museum for celebrating the revolution while also examining its violence. In a review of the museum's building, Inga Saffron for The Philadelphia Inquirer praised the exhibits but criticized its take on Georgian architecture, noting the spacious, largely empty rooms were likely designed for the museum to host private events.

== Moms for Liberty controversy ==
In 2023, the Museum of the American Revolution confirmed that it had rented its facilities for the opening ceremony for Moms for Liberty's national summit in Philadelphia, eliciting protests against the museum. Thirty-nine staffers signed a petition condemning museum leadership for sanctioning the event, arguing the reception was "endangering the safety" of LGBTQ workers and "damaging the museum’s reputation." Professional historical organizations, including the American Historical Association, Organization of American Historians, National Council on Public History, Society for Historians of the Early American Republic, and Berkshire Conference of Women Historians, criticized the museum for hosting the group. Local groups Act Up Philadelphia, Defense of Democracy, and AFSCME District Council 47 organized days-long protests against the summit's hosts, including the museum. The museum ultimately held the event on Thursday, June 29, which featured an address by Tim Barton, president of WallBuilders and son of David Barton. During the conference, hundreds of protestors demonstrated across the city with more than fifty protesting outside the museum.

The museum's decision-making spurred broader debates about history, democracy, and freedom of speech. Jen Manion lambasted the museum in The Philadelphia Inquirer, arguing it "has a responsibility to defend the history and practice of American democracy, not harbor those who seek to destroy it." Conversely, the Foundation for Individual Rights and Expression praised the museum for staying "faithful to its mission of strengthening democracy through dialogue." Jonathan Zimmerman also praised the museum in The Philadelphia Inquirer, saying that "protesters’ attempts to silence Moms for Liberty by canceling the welcome event also violates the mission of the museum."

== Exhibits ==
Visitors follow a chronological journey from the roots of conflict in the 1760s to the rise of armed resistance, the Declaration of independence of 1776 through the final years of the war. Visitors see the diversity of revolutionary-era Americans and their opinions, for example by viewing an Oneida Indian council house, and the 1773 volume Poems on Various Subjects by Phillis Wheatley, America's first published black female poet.

Several immersive gallery experiences feature a full-scale replica of Boston's Liberty Tree, the recreation of an Oneida Indian Council, the Battlefield Theater featuring the Battle of Brandywine, a recreation of Independence Hall, and a large model of an 18th-century privateer ship. A dedicated theater houses an iconic surviving artifact of the Revolution: General Washington's Headquarters Tent, which served as both his office and sleeping quarters throughout much of the war.

The museum's president and CEO, formerly the Vice President of Collections, Exhibitions, and Programming, Dr. R. Scott Stephenson holds an M.A. and Ph.D. in American History from the University of Virginia. Stephenson is a specialist in colonial and revolutionary American history and material culture with a background in visual storytelling. Dr. Philip C. Mead, Chief Historian and Curator, holds an M.A. and PhD in American History from Harvard University.

Other historians who have been consulted on the project include: Richard Beeman (University of Pennsylvania), Vincent Brown (Harvard University), Thomas Chavez (National Hispanic Cultural Center), Thomas J. Fleming (writer and novelist), James Hattendorf (US Naval War College), Don Higginbotham (University of North Carolina), Pauline Maier (Massachusetts Institute of Technology), Holly Mayer (Duquesne University), Thomas McGuire (Malvern Preparatory School), David McCullough (Yale University), Gary Nash (University of California, LA), Ray Raphael (University of California, Berkeley), Matthew Spooner (Columbia University), Laurel Thatcher Ulrich (Harvard University), and Gordon S. Wood (Brown University).

In February 2023, the museum opened a new exhibit, "Black Founders: The Forten Family of Philadelphia." The 5000-square-foot exhibit centers around James Forten, a Black Founding Father and abolitionist, and his family's push for voting rights and civil liberties for African Americans.

== Collection ==
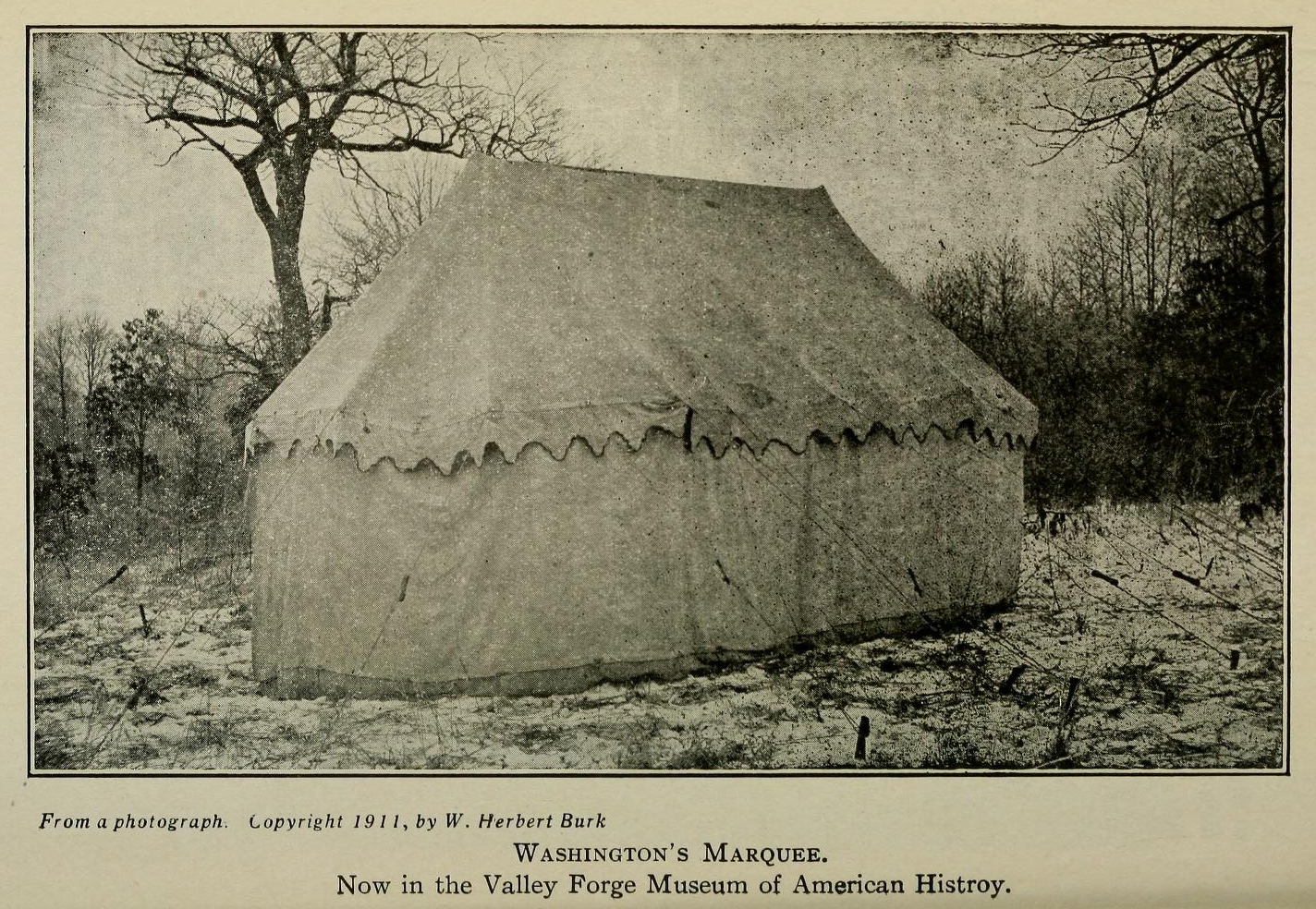
George Washington's tent

The Museum of the American Revolution has a collection of several thousand objects. The museum's collection includes items owned and used by General George Washington during the War of Independence, an extensive collection of historic firearms and edged weapons, important art, important manuscripts, and rare books. The collection started by Rev. W. Herbert Burk in the early 1900s makes up the core of the collection.

Some items have been displayed at George Washington's Mount Vernon, Valley Forge National Historical Park, the National Constitution Center, the Winterthur Museum, the Senator John Heinz History Center and the North Carolina Museum of History.

Highlights include:

- George Washington's tent
- Silver camp cups from Washington's field equipment
- Wartime correspondence and books from Washington's library
- The thirteen-star flag known as the Commander-in-Chief's Standard
- The fowling piece carried by Captain David Brown, leader of a company of minutemen from Concord, Massachusetts, and a British military musket carried by a soldier of the 4th (King's Own) Regiment of Foot, both of whom participated in the first battle of the War of Independence, April 19, 1775.
- A Dreadful Scene of Havock, Xavier della Gatta's painting of the Battle of Paoli
- The Battle of Germantown, by Xavier della Gatta (1782)
- William B. T. Trego’s iconic 1883 painting The March to Valley Forge.
- Soldiers’ letters and orderly books as well as volumes owned by Patrick Henry, George Mason and other Founders
- Volume of ancient Roman history by the author and historian Livy, owned by George Mason
- A copy of the first newspaper printing of the Declaration of Independence, printed by the Pennsylvania Evening Post on July 6, 1776
- British plan of the Battle of Brandywine
- Hessian headgear

== Selections from the collection ==
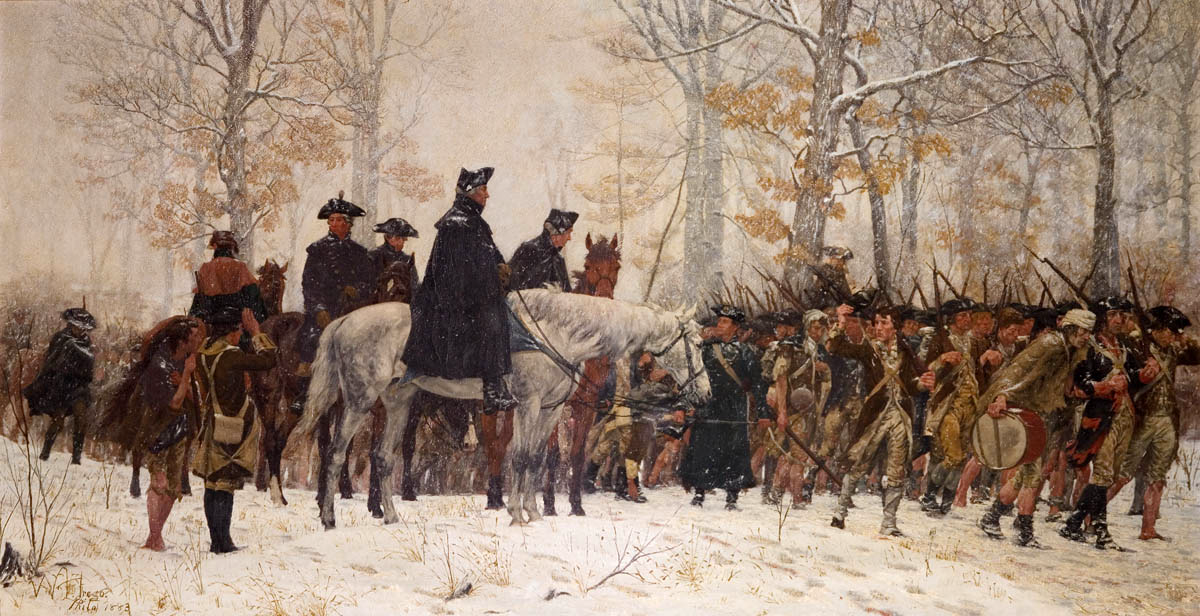
The March to Valley Forge, William B. T. Trego (1883)

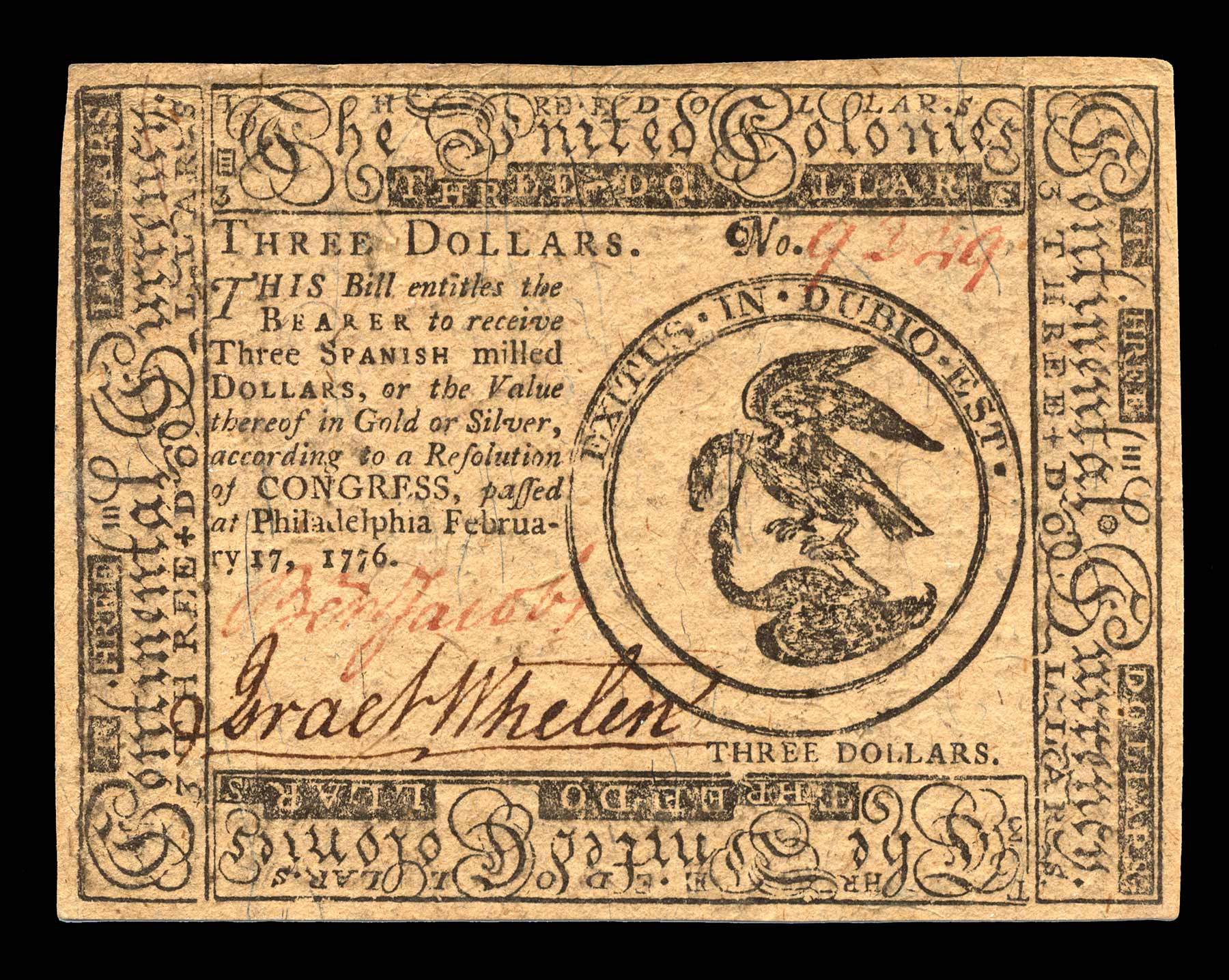
Continental Currency (1776)
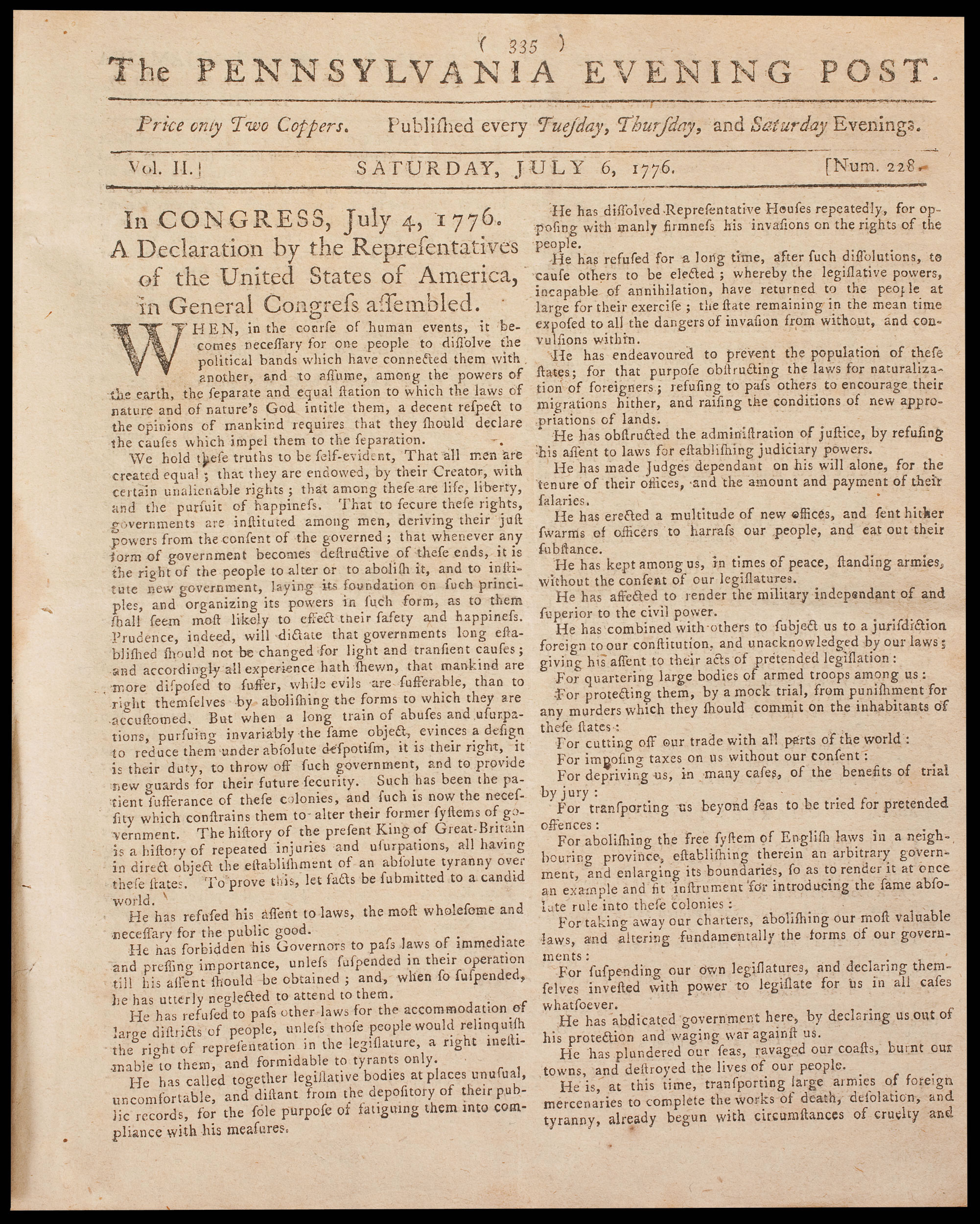
First newspaper printing of the Declaration of Independence, Pennsylvania Evening Post (1776)

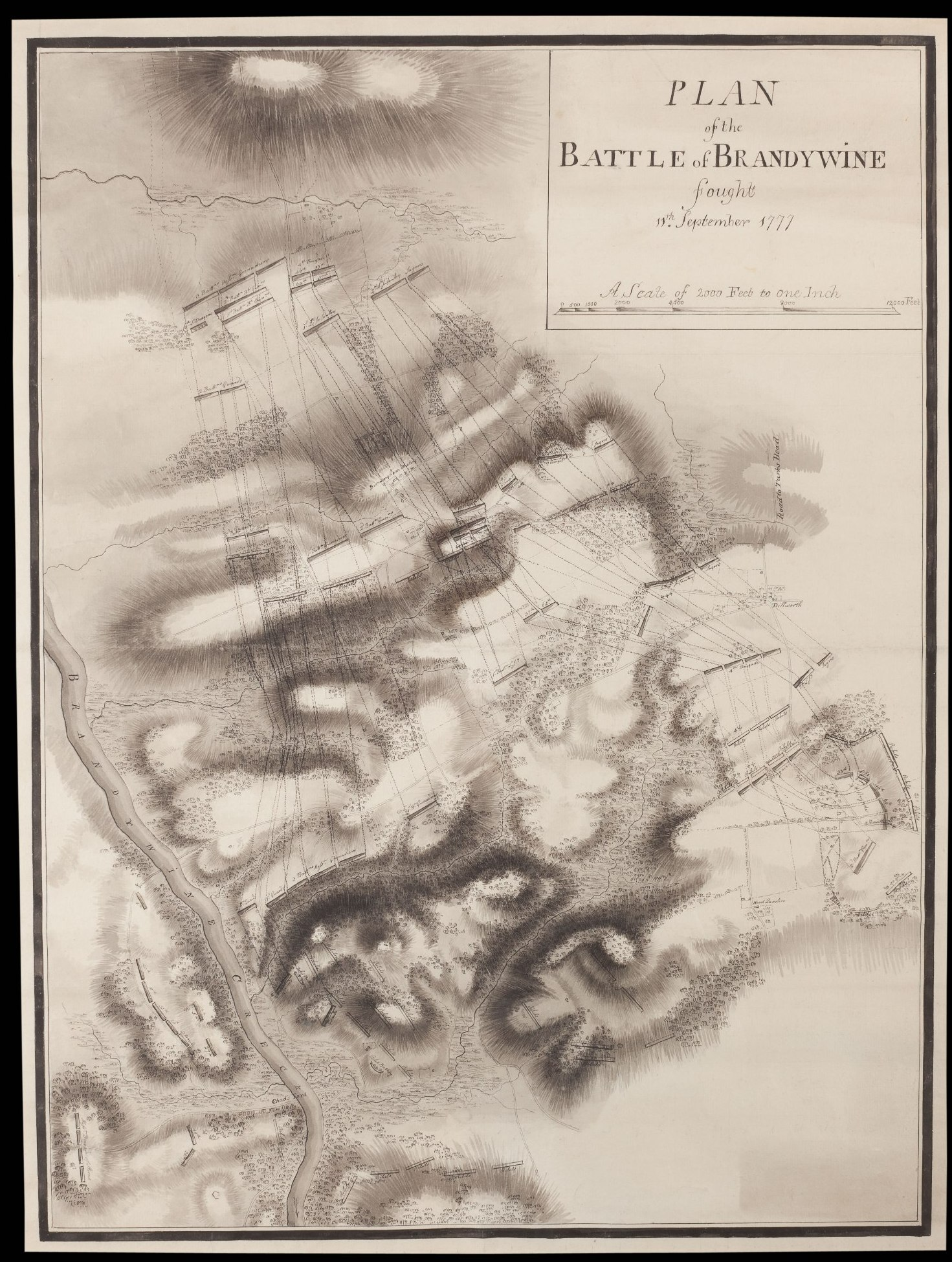
Plan of the Battle of Brandywine (1777)

== Awards ==
=== 2012 ===
- MUSE Award (Silver level) from the American Alliance of Museums in the category of Mobile Applications, recognizing the museum's American Revolution Interactive Timeline iPad app.

=== 2017 ===
- Pennsylvania Historic Preservation Award in the category of Preservation Planning for Washington's War Tent
- nominee for Leading Cultural Destinations Award 2017 – "The Museum Oscars" – for Best New Cultural Destination of the Year, North America
- Communication Arts 2017 Design Annual Awards for the museum's digital interactives by Bluecadet
- Award of Merit from the British Guild of Travel Writers
- Engineering News-Record’s Best Projects 2017 Award of Merit in the Cultural/Worship Category
- ACE Mentor Program – Urban Project of the Year

=== 2018 ===
- Excellence in Exhibition Award for Special Achievement for engaging audiences in something they think they know in new ways from the American Alliance of Museums (AAM)
- PA Museums' Institutional Award for Washington's War Tent
- American Association for State and Local History Award of Merit
- Institute of Classical Architecture's Stanford White Award in the category of commercial, civic, and institutional architecture

=== 2019 ===
- PA Museums’ Special Achievement Award for Revolution Place discovery center
- American Alliance of Museums (AAM) Award for Sustainability
- American Association for State and Local History Award for Revolution Place discovery center

=== 2020 ===
- American Association for State and Local History Award for Hamilton Was Here special exhibit
- PA Museums’ Special Achievement Award for Hamilton Was Here special exhibit

=== 2021 ===
- Bronze-level American Alliance of Museums (AAM) MUSE Award for "Finding Freedom" Online Experience
- Webby Awards honoree for the Museum's redesigned website, AmRevMuseum.org
- American Association for State and Local History Award for Cost of Revolution special exhibit
- PA Museums’ Special Achievement Award for Cost of Revolution special exhibit
- Philadelphia Business Journal’s Faces of Philanthropy Award for Citizenship Initiative

=== 2022 ===
- Silver-Level Anthem Award from The Webby Awards for "Finding Freedom" Online Experience
- American Association for State and Local History Award for When Women Lost the Vote special exhibition
- PA Museums’ Special Achievement Award for When Women Lost the Vote special exhibition
- Philadelphia Business Journal’s Faces of Philanthropy Award for African American Interpretive Program partnership with Comcast NBCUniversal

=== 2023 ===
- PA Museums’ Special Achievement Award for Liberty special exhibit
- Webby Awards Nominee for Virtual Tour of Washington's Field Headquarters
- Bronze-level Anthem Award in the Civil Rights category for the Museum's Citizenship Initiative

=== 2024 ===
- Gold-level Anthem Award in the Education, Art, and Culture category for the Timeline of the American Revolution
- Silver-level Philadelphia Inquirer Philly Favorites Award for Best Museum
- USA Today 10Best Readers' Choice Award No. 7 Best History Museum in the country
- PA Museums’ Special Achievement Award for Black Founders: The Forten Family of Philadelphia
- American Association for State and Local History (AASLH) Award of Excellence for Black Founders: The Forten Family of Philadelphia
- Gold-level w3 Award in the Education category for the Timeline of the American Revolution

=== 2025 ===
- Philadelphia Inquirer Philly Favorites Awards: Gold-level Best Attraction, Gold-level Best Place to Take Visitors, Silver-level Best Museum
- USA Today 10 Best Readers' Choice Award No. 5 Best History Museum in the country

=== 2026 ===
- Webby Award for “Finding Freedom” Online Experience

== See also ==
- Founding Fathers of the United States
