= Yael Karshon =

Israeli and Canadian mathematician

- יעל קרשון
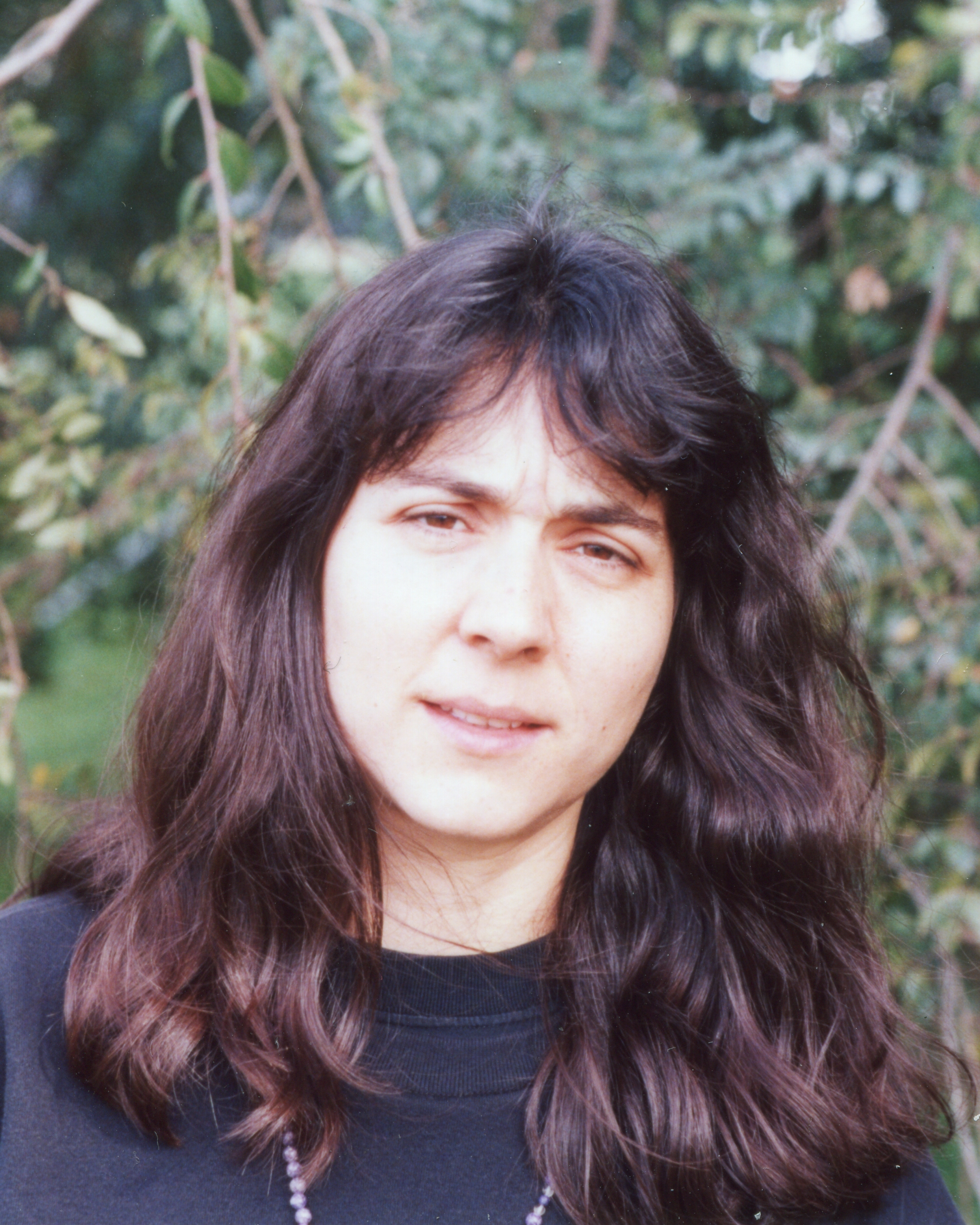
- Karshon in 2000
- Born: 1964 (age 61–62)
- Education: Harvard University
- Known for: Symplectic geometry
- Awards: Krieger–Nelson Prize (2008)
- Scientific career
- Fields: Mathematics
- Workplaces: University of Toronto Mississauga, Tel Aviv University
- Doctoral advisor: Shlomo Sternberg

Yael Karshon (Hebrew: יעל קרשון; born 1964) is an Israeli and Canadian mathematician who has been described as "one of Canada's leading experts in symplectic geometry". She works as a professor at the University of Toronto Mississauga and Tel Aviv University.

== Education and career ==
Karshon took part in the 1982 International Mathematical Olympiad, on the Israeli team. She earned her Ph.D. in 1993 from Harvard University under the supervision of Shlomo Sternberg.

After working as a C. L. E. Moore instructor at the Massachusetts Institute of Technology, and then earning tenure at the Hebrew University of Jerusalem, she moved to the University of Toronto Mississauga in 2002.

== Selected publications ==
Karshon is the author of the monographs Periodic Hamiltonian flows on four dimensional manifolds (Memoirs of the American Mathematical Society 672, 1999), which completely classified the Hamiltonian actions of the circle group on four-dimensional compact manifolds. With Viktor Ginzburg and Victor Guillemin, she also wrote Moment maps, cobordisms, and Hamiltonian group actions (Mathematical Surveys and Monographs 98, American Mathematical Society, 2002), which surveys "symplectic geometry in the context of equivariant cobordism".

== Awards and honours ==
Karshon won the Krieger–Nelson Prize in 2008.

== Personal ==
Karshon is from Israel, and lived in the US for ten years, eventually becoming a permanent resident. She took Canadian citizenship in 2011. From her marriage to mathematician Dror Bar-Natan she has two sons.
