= R. Scott Stephenson =

American historian

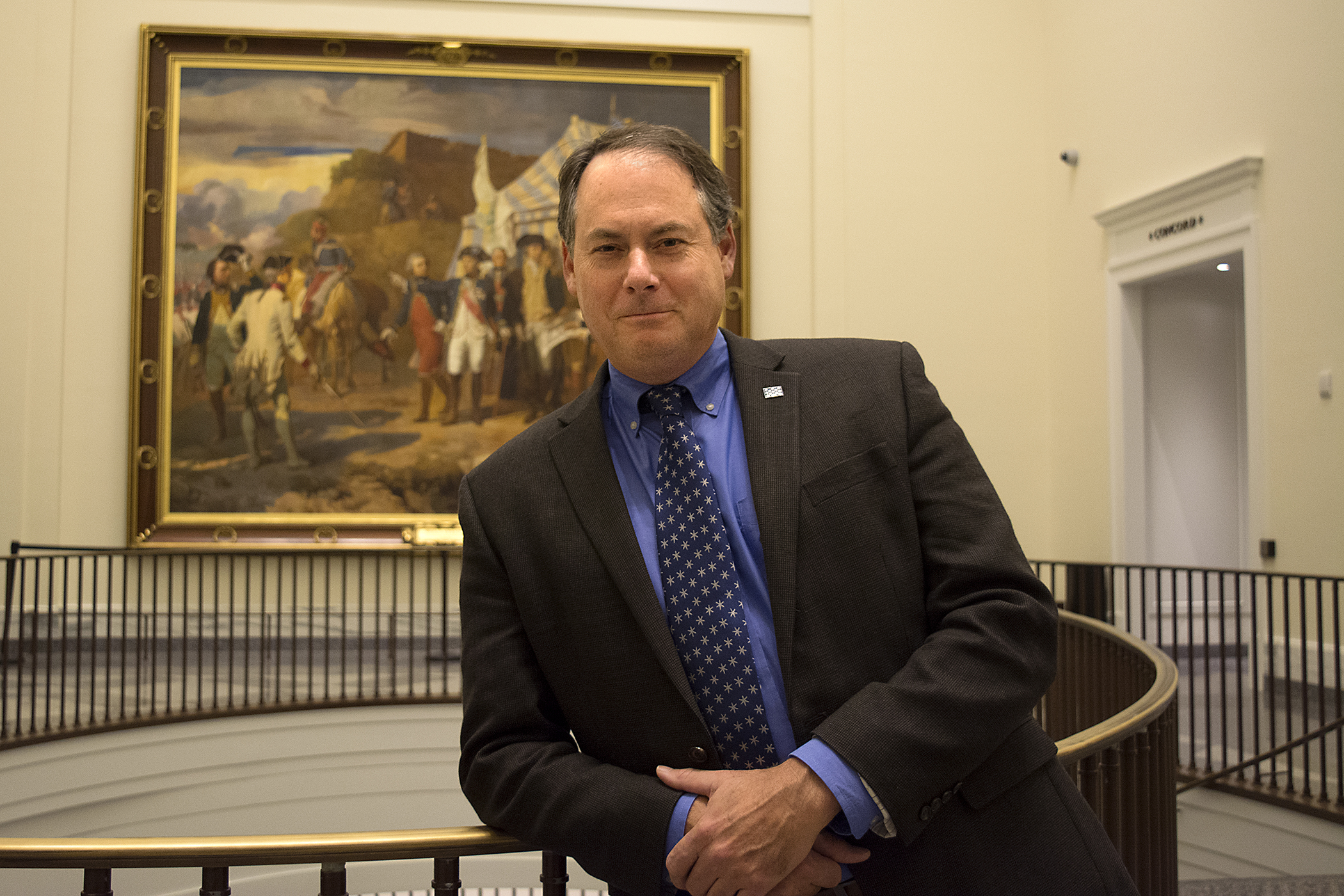

CEO of the Museum of the American Revolution
- Incumbent
- Assumed office November 1, 2018

Personal details
- Education: Juniata College (BA); University of Virginia (MA, PhD)

R. Scott Stephenson is an American historian and museum professional who has served as president and CEO of the Museum of the American Revolution in Philadelphia since 2018. Stephenson previously served as the museum's first director of collections and interpretation from 2007 to 2018, during which time he oversaw the development of the museum's award-winning exhibitions, multimedia experiences, and educational programs as well the museum's collection. Stephenson was on the team that raised $173 million to build and open the museum, surpassing the $150 million campaign goal. Prior to that, he developed and collaborated on exhibits, films, and interpretive programs for a number of historical institutions including Colonial Williamsburg and the Smithsonian.

== Education ==
Stephenson holds an M.A. and Ph.D. in American history from the University of Virginia. He is a specialist in colonial and revolutionary American history and material culture with a background in visual storytelling. He received his bachelor's degree from Juniata College.

== Exhibits and media coverage ==
Stephenson oversaw the creation of a traveling exhibit called "Clash of Empires" at the Heinz History Center to mark the 250th anniversary of the French and Indian War. In 2006, he consulted on a four-hour PBS miniseries called The War that Made America, which dealt with the French and Indian War. He served as a consultant on The Last of the Mohicans (1992), Hostages of Two Worlds (2001), and Washington: Man and Myth (1999). Stephenson has appeared as himself on episodes of the Emmy Award-winning genealogy show Who Do You Think You Are? He has appeared on numerous C-SPAN programs. In June 2019, he was interviewed in a segment about the museum on CBS News about telling a more inclusive, nuanced version of the American Revolution. In 2017, Stephenson was part of the team, with Philip Mead, that discovered the only known period image of General George Washington's Revolutionary War tent in the field.

In June 2023, Stephenson came under scrutiny for the Museum of the American Revolution's decision to hold space for a Moms for Liberty event. Thirty-nine of the museum's 112 staff members signed a petition opposing the event, which led to an internal museum-wide meeting where he ultimately declined to cancel it. The American Historical Association sent Stephenson an open letter, urging him as CEO to cancel the event. Six state senators, including Nikil Saval, Vincent J. Hughes, and Anthony H. Williams, also sent an open letter to Stephenson, calling Moms for Liberty a "hate group" and urging him to cancel the event and "stay true to the museum's values." However, the Foundation for Individual Rights and Expression (F.I.R.E.) praised the museum under Stephenson's leadership for staying "faithful to its mission of strengthening democracy through dialogue."

== Personal life ==
Stephenson is married to pediatric neurologist Donna Stephenson. They have two children and live in Chester County, Pennsylvania.
