= Philip Mead =

Philip Mead may refer to:

- Phil Mead (1887–1958), English cricketer
- Philip Mead (historian), American historian
