= Shlomo Sternberg =

American mathematician (1936–2024)

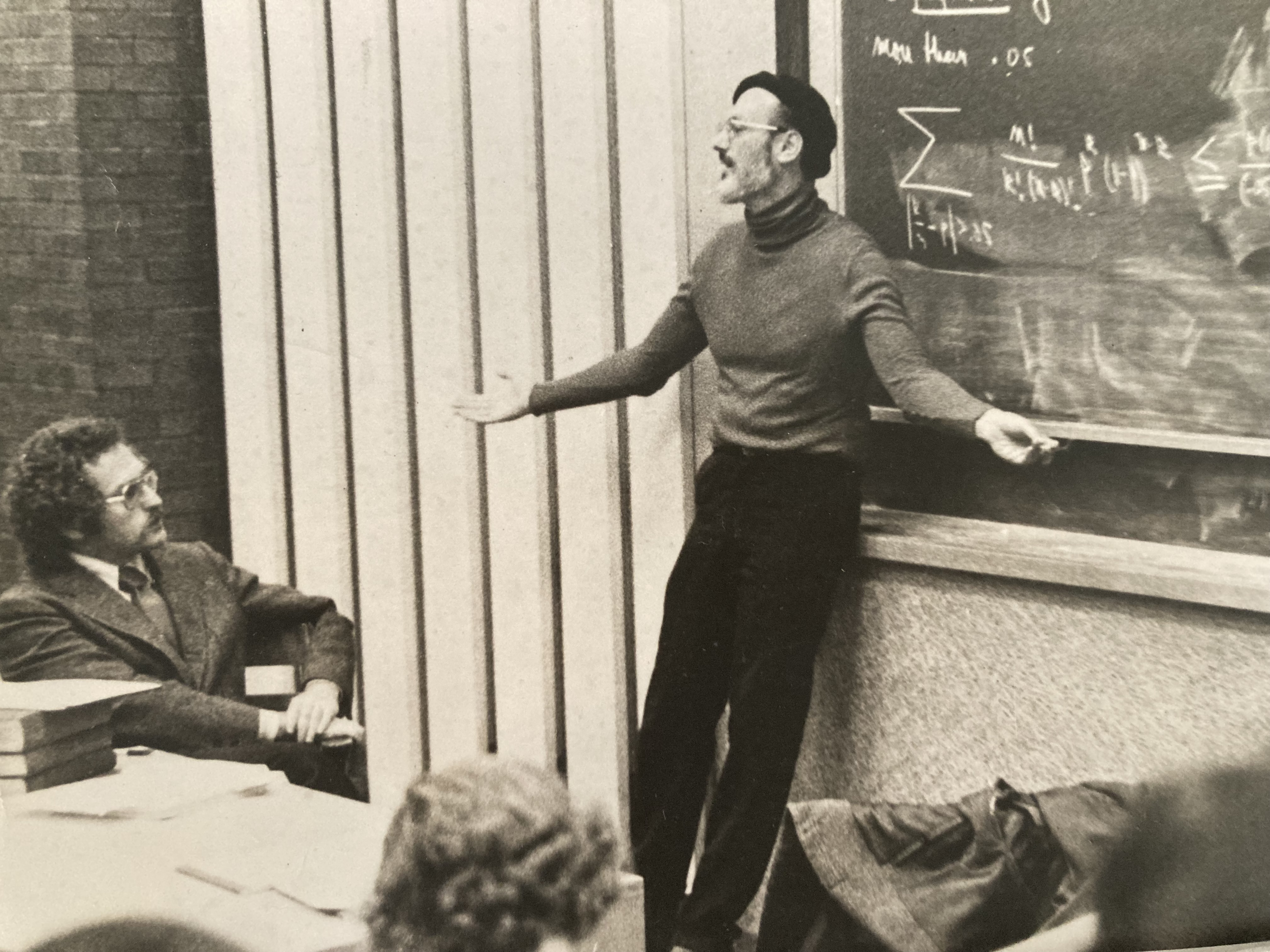
- Born: January 20, 1936
- Died: August 23, 2024 (aged 88)
- Education: Johns Hopkins University
- Awards: Guggenheim Fellowship, 1974
- Scientific career
- Fields: Mathematics
- Workplaces: Harvard University; New York University; University of Chicago
- Thesis: Some Problems in Discrete Nonlinear Transformations in One and Two Dimensions (1955)
- Doctoral advisor: Aurel Friedrich Wintner
- Doctoral students: Victor Guillemin; Ravindra Kulkarni; Yael Karshon; Steve Shnider; Israel Michael Sigal; Sandy Zabell
- Website: https://www.math.harvard.edu/people/sternberg-shlomo/

Shlomo Zvi Sternberg (January 20, 1936 – August 23, 2024) was an American mathematician known for his work in geometry, particularly symplectic geometry and Lie theory. He also wrote some well-known textbooks.

== Education and career ==
Sternberg earned his PhD in 1955 from Johns Hopkins University, with a thesis entitled Some Problems in Discrete Nonlinear Transformations in One and Two Dimensions, supervised by Aurel Wintner.

After postdoctoral work at New York University (1956–1957) and an instructorship at University of Chicago (1957–1959), Sternberg joined the Mathematics Department at Harvard University in 1959, where he was George Putnam Professor of Pure and Applied Mathematics until 2017. Since 2017, he was Emeritus Professor at the Harvard Mathematics Department.

Sternberg was awarded a Guggenheim fellowship in 1974 and an honorary doctorate by the University of Mannheim in 1991. He delivered the AMS Colloquium Lecture in 1990 and the Hebrew University's Albert Einstein Memorial Lecture in 2006.

Sternberg was elected member of the American Academy of Arts and Sciences in 1969, of the National Academy of Sciences in 1986, of the Spanish Royal Academy of Sciences In 1999, and of the American Philosophical Society in 2010.

== Research ==
Sternberg's first well-known published result, based on his PhD thesis, is known as the "Sternberg linearization theorem" which asserts that a smooth map near a hyperbolic fixed point can be made linear by a smooth change of coordinates provided that certain non-resonance conditions are satisfied. He also proved generalizations of the Birkhoff canonical form theorems for volume preserving mappings in n-dimensions and symplectic mappings, all in the smooth case.

In the 1960s, Sternberg became involved with Isadore Singer in the project of revisiting Élie Cartan's papers from the early 1900s on the classification of the simple transitive infinite Lie pseudogroups, and of relating Cartan's results to recent results in the theory of G-structures and supplying rigorous (by present-day standards) proofs of his main theorems. Together with Victor Guillemin and Daniel Quillen, he extended this classification to a larger class of pseudogroups: the primitive infinite pseudogroups. As a by-product, they also obtained the "integrability of characteristics" theorem for over-determined systems of partial differential equations.

Sternberg provided contributions also to the topic of Lie group actions on symplectic manifolds, in particular involving various aspects of the theory of symplectic reduction. For instance, together with Bertram Kostant he showed how to use reduction techniques to give a rigorous mathematical treatment of what is known in the physics literature as the BRST quantization procedure. Together with David Kazhdan and Bertram Kostant, he showed how one can simplify the analysis of dynamical systems of Calogero type by describing them as symplectic reductions of much simpler systems. Together with Victor Guillemin he gave the first rigorous formulation and proof of a hitherto vague assertion about Lie group actions on symplectic manifolds, namely the Quantization commutes with reduction conjecture. This last work was also the inspiration for a result in equivariant symplectic geometry that disclosed for the first time a surprising and unexpected connection between the theory of Hamiltonian torus actions on compact symplectic manifolds and the theory of convex polytopes. This theorem, the "AGS convexity theorem," was simultaneously proved by Guillemin-Sternberg and Michael Atiyah in the early 1980s.

Sternberg's contributions to symplectic geometry and Lie theory have also included a number of basic textbooks on these subjects, among them the three graduate level texts with Victor Guillemin: "Geometric Asymptotics," "Symplectic Techniques in Physics", and "Semi-Classical Analysis". His "Lectures on Differential Geometry" is a popular standard textbook for upper-level undergraduate courses on differential manifolds, the calculus of variations, Lie theory and the geometry of G-structures. He also published the more recent "Curvature in mathematics and physics".

Sternberg worked with Yuval Ne'eman on supersymmetry in elementary particle physics, exploring from this perspective the Higgs mechanism, the method of spontaneous symmetry breaking and a unified approach to the theory of quarks and leptons.

== Religion ==
Sternberg was Jewish and an orthodox rabbi.

== Death ==
Sternberg died in the old city of Jerusalem, on August 23, 2024. His funeral took place at Eretz Hachayim Cemetery in Beit Shemesh Israel on August 25, 2024.

== Selected monographs and books ==
- Shlomo Sternberg (2019) A Mathematical Companion to Quantum Mechanics Dover Publications ISBN 9780486826899 ISBN 0486826899
- Shlomo Zvi Sternberg and Lynn Harold Loomis (2014) Advanced Calculus (Revised Edition) World Scientific Publishing ISBN 978-981-4583-92-3; 978-981-4583-93-0
- Victor Guillemin and Shlomo Sternberg (2013) Semi-Classical Analysis International Press of Boston ISBN 978-1571462763
- Shlomo Sternberg (2012) Lectures on Symplectic Geometry (in Mandarin) Lecture notes of Mathematical Science Center of Tsingua University, International Press ISBN 978-7-302-29498-6
- Shlomo Sternberg (2012) Curvature in Mathematics and Physics Dover Publications, Inc. ISBN 978-0486478555
- Sternberg, Shlomo (2010). Dynamical Systems Dover Publications, Inc. ISBN 978-0486477053
- Shlomo Sternberg (2004), Lie algebras, Harvard University
- Victor Guillemin and Shlomo Sternberg (1999) Supersymmetry and Equivariant de Rham Theory 1999 Springer Verlag ISBN 978-3540647973
- Victor Guillemin, Eugene Lerman, and Shlomo Sternberg, (1996) Symplectic Fibrations and Multiplicity Diagrams Cambridge University Press
- Shlomo Sternberg (1994) Group Theory and Physics Cambridge University Press. ISBN 0-521-24870-1
- Steven Shnider and Shlomo Sternberg (1993) Quantum Groups. From Coalgebras to Drinfeld Algebras: A Guided Tour (Mathematical Physics Ser.) International Press
- Victor Guillemin and Shlomo Sternberg (1990) Variations on a Theme by Kepler; reprint, 2006 Colloquium Publications ISBN 978-0821841846
- Paul Bamberg and Shlomo Sternberg (1988) A Course in Mathematics for Students of Physics Volume 1 1991 Cambridge University Press. ISBN 978-0521406499
- Paul Bamberg and Shlomo Sternberg (1988) A Course in Mathematics for Students of Physics Volume 2 1991 Cambridge University Press. ISBN 978-0521406505
- Victor Guillemin and Shlomo Sternberg (1984) Symplectic Techniques in Physics, 1990 Cambridge University Press ISBN 978-0521389907
- Guillemin, Victor and Sternberg, Shlomo (1977) Geometric asymptotics Providence, RI: American Mathematical Society. ISBN 0-8218-1514-8; reprinted in 1990 as an on-line book
- Shlomo Sternberg (1969) Celestial Mechanics Part I W.A. Benjamin
- Shlomo Sternberg (1969) Celestial Mechanics Part II W.A. Benjamin
- Lynn H. Loomis, and Shlomo Sternberg (1968) Advanced Calculus Boston (World Scientific Publishing Company 2014); text available on-line
- Victor Guillemin and Shlomo Sternberg (1966) Deformation Theory of Pseudogroup Structures American Mathematical Society
- Shlomo Sternberg (1964) Lectures on differential geometry New York: Chelsea (1093) ISBN 0-8284-0316-3.
- I. M. Singer and Shlomo Sternberg (1965) The infinite groups of Lie and Cartan. Part I. The transitive groups, Journal d'Analyse Mathématique 15, 1—114.

== See also ==
- Symplectic manifold
- Symplectic topology
