= Leah Keshet =

Israeli-Canadian mathematical biologist

Leah Edelstein-Keshet
- לאה אדלשטיין-קשת
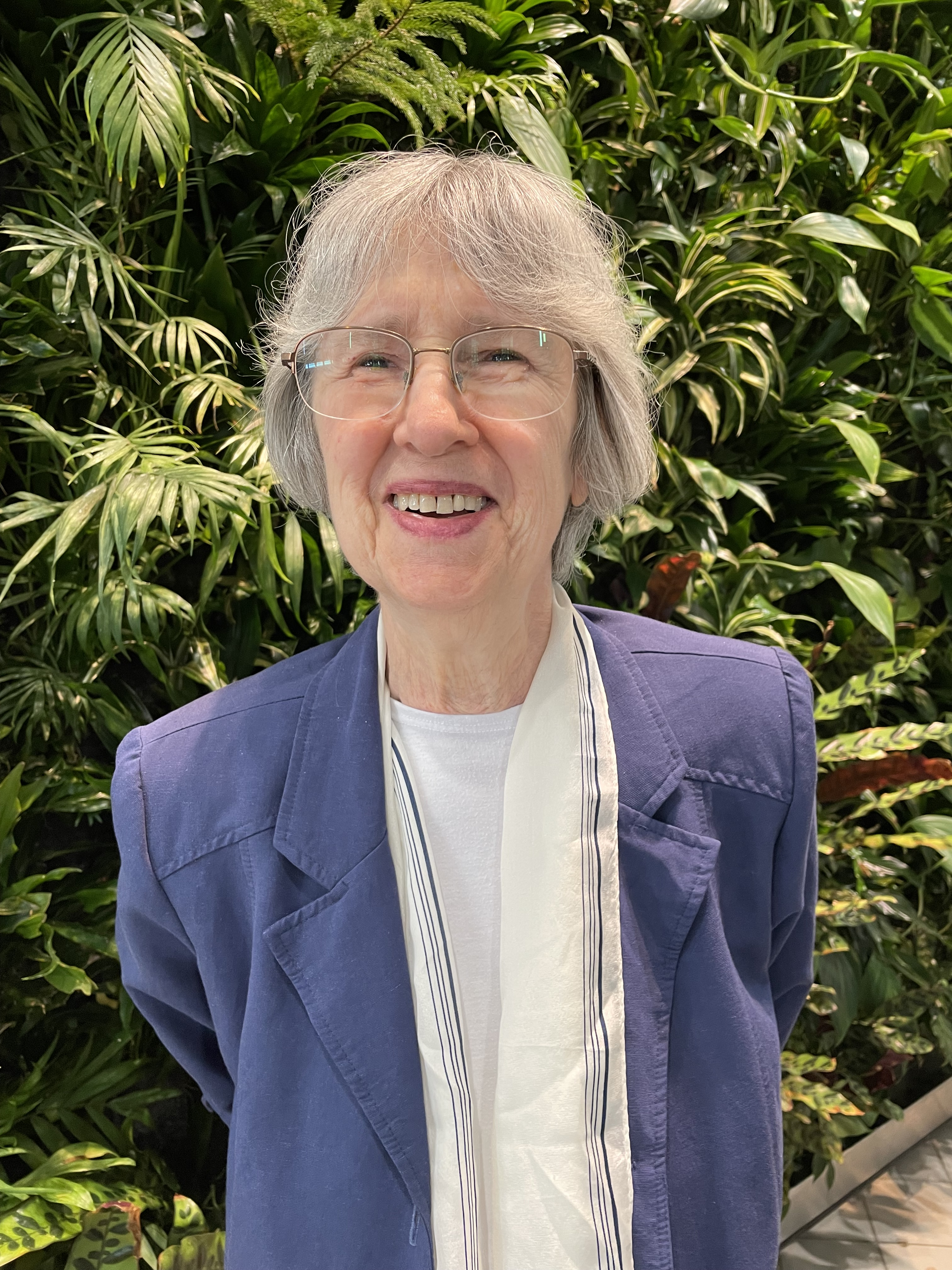
- Scientist Leah Edelstein-Keshet at the 2026 Frontiers in Biophysics Conference
- Education: Dalhousie University; Weizmann Institute of Science
- Scientific career
- Fields: Mathematical Biology, Biophysics
- Institutions: University of British Columbia
- Doctoral advisor: Lee Segel
- Website: https://www.math.ubc.ca/~keshet/keshet.html

Leah Edelstein-Keshet (Hebrew: לאה אדלשטיין-קשת) is an Israeli-Canadian mathematical biologist.

Edelstein-Keshet is known for her contributions to the field of mathematical biology and biophysics. Her research spans many topics including sub-cellular biology, ecology, and biomedical research, with particular focus on cell motility and the cytoskeleton, modeling of physiology and diseases, such as autoimmune diabetes, and swarming and aggregation behavior in social organisms.

She is a full-time professor at the University of British Columbia in Vancouver, Canada.

== Early life and education ==
Edelstein-Keshet was born in Israel, and moved to Canada with her parents when she was 12. She earned her Bachelor of Science and Master of Science in Mathematics from Dalhousie University and received in 1982 her doctorate in Applied Mathematics from the Weizmann Institute of Science in Israel, where she was supervised by Lee Segel.

== Career ==
Edelstein-Keshet held teaching positions at Brown University and Duke University before joining the University of British Columbia as an associate professor in 1989, where she is now Associate Head (Faculty Affairs). She has authored three books, including Mathematical Models in Biology in the SIAM Series and Classics in Applied Mathematics. In 1995 she became the first female president of the Society for Mathematical Biology.

== Awards and recognition ==
In 2003 she was awarded the Krieger–Nelson Prize of the Canadian Mathematical Society. She became a Fellow of the Society for Industrial and Applied Mathematics in 2014 "for contributions to the mathematics and modeling of the cell, the immune system, and biological swarms, as well as to applied mathematics education". She was also awarded a Faculty of Science Award for Leadership from the University of British Columbia. She is the 2022 SIAM John von Neumann Prize Lecturer.

== See also ==
- Timeline of women in science
