= Tara S. Holm =

American mathematician

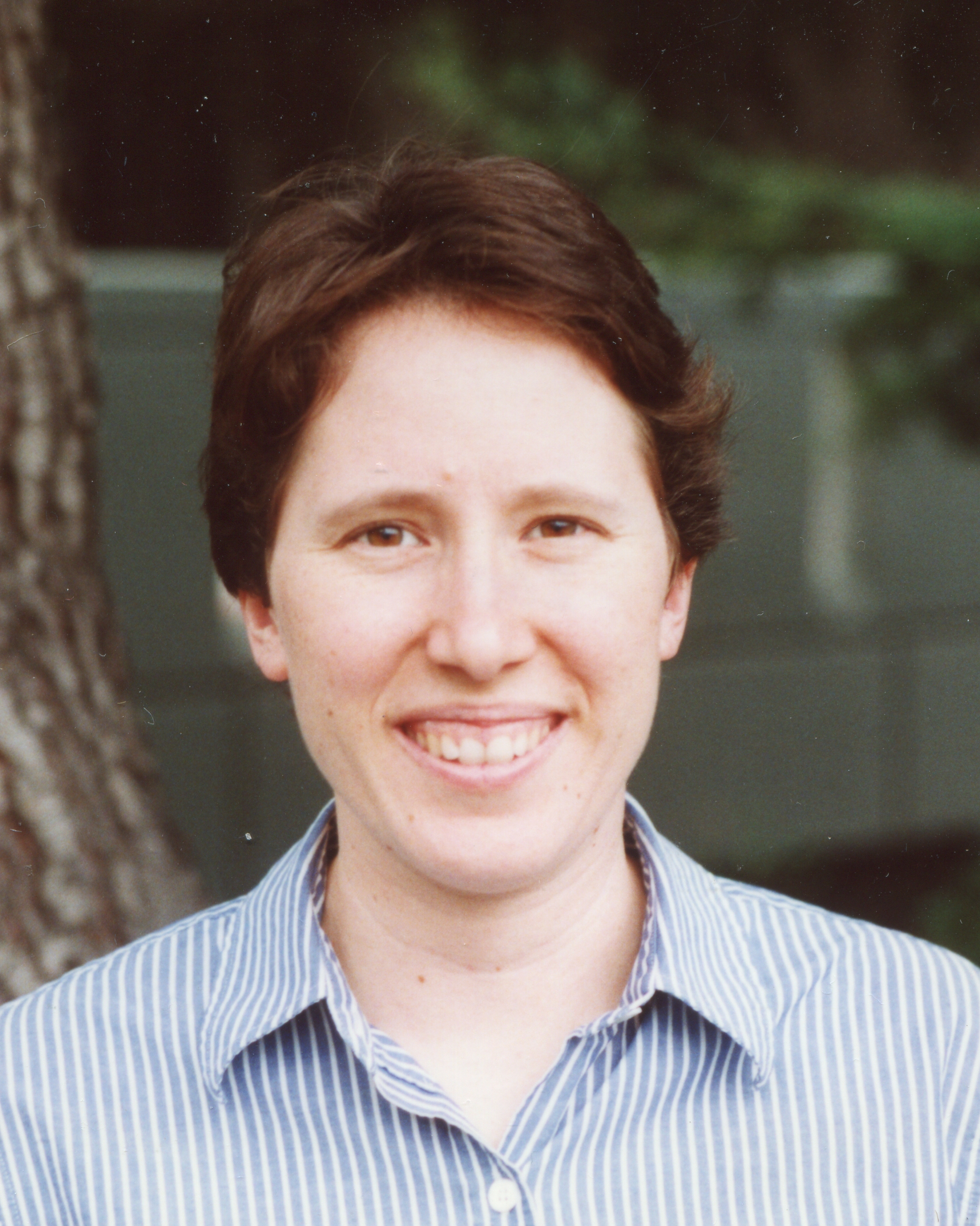
- Citizenship: United States
- Education: Massachusetts Institute of Technology
- Known for: Abstract algebra
- Awards: Simons Fellow; Fellow of the American Mathematical Society
- Scientific career
- Fields: Mathematics
- Workplaces: Cornell University
- Thesis: Equivariant Cohomology, Homogeneous Spaces and Graphs (2002)
- Doctoral advisor: Victor William Guillemin

Tara Suzanne Holm is a mathematician at Cornell University specializing in algebraic geometry and symplectic geometry.

== Life and career ==
Holm graduated summa cum laude from Dartmouth College. Holm received her Ph.D. from the Massachusetts Institute of Technology in 2002 under the supervision of Victor Guillemin. She went on to a three-year postdoc at the University of California, Berkeley, before eventually joining the faculty at Cornell.

== Awards and honors ==
In 2012, Holm became a fellow of the American Mathematical Society.

In 2013, Holm was awarded a Simons Fellowship.

In 2019, Holm was awarded the Sze/Hernandez Teaching prize at Cornell.

In 2019, Holm was the AWM/MAA Falconer Lecturer at MAA MathFest.

From 2011-2013, Holm was an American Mathematical Society Council member at large, and from 2013-2016 she was a member of the American Mathematical Society Executive Committee.

== Personal life ==
Holm is married to Timothy Riley, also a mathematics professor at Cornell. Through her marriage, she is a member of the Cobbold family.

== Selected publications ==
- Harada, Megumi; Henriques, André; Holm, Tara S. (2005). "Computation of generalized equivariant cohomologies of Kac-Moody flag varieties". Advances in Mathematics. 197 (1): 198–221. arXiv:math/0409305. doi:10.1016/j.aim.2004.10.003.
- Guillemin, V.; Holm, T.; Zara, C. (2006). "A GKM description of the equivariant cohomology ring of a homogeneous space". Journal of Algebraic Combinatorics. 23 (1): 21–41. arXiv:math/0112184. doi:10.1007/s10801-006-6027-4.
- Hausmann, Jean-Claude; Holm, Tara S.; Puppe, Volker (2005). "Conjugation spaces". Algebraic & Geometric Topology. 5: 923–964. arXiv:math/0412057. doi:10.2140/agt.2005.5.923.
- Biss, Daniel; Guillemin, Victor W.; Holm, Tara S. (2004). "The mod 2 cohomology of fixed point sets of anti-symplectic involutions". Advances in Mathematics. 185 (2): 370–399. doi:10.1016/j.aim.2003.07.007.
