= Rachel Kuske =

American mathematician

- Born: 1965
- Education: Northwestern University
- Known for: Stochastic and Nonlinear Dynamics
- Scientific career
- Fields: Mathematics
- Workplaces: Georgia Institute of Technology
- Doctoral advisor: Bernard J. Matkowsky

Rachel Ann Kuske (born 1965) is an American-Canadian applied mathematician and Professor and Chair of Mathematics at the Georgia Institute of Technology.

== Professional career ==
Kuske received her PhD in Applied Mathematics from Northwestern University in 1992. Her dissertation, Asymptotic Analysis of Random Wave Equations, was supervised by Bernard J. Matkowsky. From 1997 to 2002, she was Assistant Professor and then associate professor at the University of Minnesota. She is an expert on stochastic and nonlinear dynamics, mathematical modeling, asymptotic methods, and industrial mathematics. She served on the Scientific Advisory Board for the Institute for Computational and Experimental Research in Mathematics (ICERM), and as of 2021 she serves on ICERM's board of trustees.

== Awards and honours ==
Kuske was awarded a Sloan Fellowship in 1992 and was made a Canada Research Chair in 2002.

In 2011 Kuske was a recipient of the Canadian Mathematical Society Krieger–Nelson Prize, given to outstanding woman in mathematics in Canada.

In 2015 she became a fellow of the Society for Industrial and Applied Mathematics "for contributions to the theory of stochastic and nonlinear dynamics and its application, and for promoting equity and diversity in mathematics."
