= Evelyn Nelson (mathematician) =

Canadian mathematician (1943–1987)

Evelyn Merle Nelson (November 25, 1943 – August 1, 1987), born Evelyn Merle Roden, was a Canadian mathematician. Nelson made contributions to the area of universal algebra with applications to theoretical computer science. She, along with Cecilia Krieger, is the namesake of the Krieger–Nelson Prize, awarded by the Canadian Mathematical Society for outstanding research by a female mathematician.

== Early life ==
Nelson was born on November 25, 1943, in Hamilton, Ontario, Canada. Her parents were immigrants from Russia in the 1920s. Nelson went to high school at Westdale Secondary School in Hamilton.

== Education ==
After spending two years at the University of Toronto, Nelson returned to Hamilton to study at McMaster University. She received her B.Sc in mathematics from McMaster in 1965, followed by an M.Sc. in mathematics from McMaster in 1967. She succeeded in having her thesis work published in the Canadian Journal of Mathematics, also in 1967; the article was entitled "Finiteness of semigroups of operators in universal algebra".

Nelson completed her Ph.D. in 1970. Her thesis was entitled "The lattice of equational classes of commutative semigroups", and the ideas also formed a journal paper published in the Canadian Journal of Mathematics.

== Career ==
Following completion of her Ph.D., Nelson continued at McMaster. She first worked as a post-doctoral researcher, later as a "research associate", and in 1978 was appointed associate professor. Serving as chair of the Unit of Computer Science at McMaster from 1982 until 1984, Nelson became a full professor in 1983.

Nelson's teaching record was, according to one colleague, "invariably of the highest order". However, before earning a faculty position at McMaster, prejudice against her led to doubts about her teaching ability.

Nelson published over 40 papers during her 20-year career. She died from cancer in 1987.

== Recognition ==
Nelson is the namesake, along with Cecilia Krieger, of the Krieger–Nelson Prize, which is awarded to a female mathematician in recognition of outstanding achievement. The Department of Mathematics at McMaster University has a lecture series, "The Evelyn Nelson Lectures", held since 1991.

== Selected publications ==
- Nelson, Evelyn (January 1983). "Iterative algebras". Theoretical Computer Science. 25 (1): 67. doi:10.1016/0304-3975(83)90014-2.
- Banaschewski, Bernhard; Nelson, Evelyn (August 1982). "Completions of Partially Ordered Sets". SIAM Journal on Computing. 11 (3): 521–528. doi:10.1137/0211041.
- Adamek, Jiri; Nelson, Evelyn; Reiterman, Jan (February 1982). "Tree constructions of free continuous algebras". Journal of Computer and System Sciences. 24 (1): 114–146. doi:10.1016/0022-0000(82)90059-9.
- Mekler, Alan H.; Nelson, Evelyn; Shelah, Saharon (March 1993). "A Variety with Solvable, but not Uniformly Solvable, Word Problem". Proceedings of the London Mathematical Society. s3-66 (2): 225–256. arXiv:math/9301203. doi:10.1112/plms/s3-66.2.225. S2CID 11025580.
- Banaschewski, Bernhard; Nelson, Evelyn (1980). "Boolean powers as algebras of continuous functions". Instytut Matematyczny Polskiej Akademi Nauk.
- Burris, Stanley; Nelson, Evelyn (September 1971). "Embedding the Dual of Π m in the Lattice of Equational Classes of Commutative Semigroups". Proceedings of the American Mathematical Society. 30 (1): 37. doi:10.2307/2038214. JSTOR 2038214.
- Society, Canadian Mathematical (1967). "Finiteness of Semigroups of Operators in Universal Algebra". Canadian Journal of Mathematics. 19: 764–768. doi:10.4153/cjm-1967-070-8. S2CID 123476533.
