= W. Herbert Burk =

W. Herbert Burk (1867-1933) was an Episcopal priest and founding vicar of the Washington Memorial Chapel in the Valley Forge National Historical Park. He is known for assembling, over the course of many years, the collection of Revolutionary War artifacts that form the core of the collection of the Museum of the American Revolution in Philadelphia, and for his work to preserve Valley Forge, the site of an important Revolutionary War army encampment.

== Early life and career ==
Burk was the son of Rev. Jesse Y. Burk rector of Old St Peter's Church, Clarksboro, New Jersey. He graduated from the University of Pennsylvania and the Philadelphia Divinity School (Episcopal). He was ordained in 1894, and became pastor of the Church of the Ascension in Gloucester City, NJ. Then of St. John's Church, Norristown, and of All Saints' Church, Norristown, Pennsylvania. Finally, he became rector of the Washington Memorial Chapel in Valley Forge.

Burk was married to Abbie Jessup Reeves, and widowed when she died in 1909. He later married Eleanor Hallowell Stroud.

== Commemorator of George Washington and the American Revolution ==
On George Washington's Birthday in 1903, Rev. Burke, then rector of All Saints' Church in Norristown, Pennsylvania, gave a sermon in which he argued that Washington's piety the center of his character and suggested building a "wayside chapel," to serve as a "fit memorial of the Church's most honored son." The sermon inspired the building of the Washington Memorial Chapel, in which Burk would serve as rector for the rest of his life.

In 1909 Burke purchased the exterior of George Washington's tent for display in the Valley Forge Museum of American History, predecessor to the Valley Forge Historical Society. Now part of the collection and on display at the Museum of the American Revolution in Philadelphia, it was formerly exhibited in a museum on the grounds of the 1777-1778 Valley Forge encampment.

For several decades, Burke accepted gifts of Revolutionary War artifacts, sent mostly by descendants of the original owners. This became the founding collection of the Museum of the American Revolution. In 1918 he founded the Valley Forge Historical Society.

== Books ==
- The Valley Forge Address of Theodore Roosevelt, (Norristown, Pa., 1909), edited by Burk; contains Burk's 1903 Washington's Birthday sermon.
- Making a Museum: The Confessions of a Curator, (1926).
- Historical and Topographical Guide to Valley Forge, (1912).

== Sources ==
- In the Beginning: at Valley Forge and the Washington Memorial Chapel, By Eleanor H.S. Burk, 1938. online copy of Chapter 5
- Valley Forge: The Making and Remaking of a National Symbol, by Lorett Treese, 1993.
