= Matilde Lalín =

Argentine-Canadian mathematician

Matilde Noemí Lalín is an Argentine-Canadian mathematician specializing in number theory and known for her work on L-functions, Mahler measure, and their connections. She is a professor of mathematics at the Université de Montréal.

== Education and career ==
Lalín is originally from Buenos Aires, and is a dual citizen of Argentina and Canada. As a high school student, she represented Argentina twice in the International Mathematical Olympiad, in 1993 and 1995, earning a silver medal in 1995.

She earned a licenciatura in 1999 from the University of Buenos Aires. After starting graduate study at Princeton University and spending a term as a visiting student at Harvard University, she completed her doctorate in 2005 at the University of Texas at Austin. Her dissertation, Some Relations of Mahler Measure with Hyperbolic Volumes and Special Values of L-Functions, was supervised there by Fernando Rodriguez-Villegas.

She became a postdoctoral researcher at the Institute for Advanced Study, Mathematical Sciences Research Institute, Institut des Hautes Études Scientifiques, Max Planck Institute for Mathematics, and Pacific Institute for the Mathematical Sciences, before obtaining a tenure-track faculty position in 2007 as an assistant professor of mathematics at the University of Alberta. She moved to the Université de Montréal in 2010, earned tenure as an associate professor there in 2012, and was promoted to full professor in 2018.

== Recognition ==
Lalín is the 2022 winner of the Krieger–Nelson Prize of the Canadian Mathematical Society, "for her outstanding contributions to research in Number Theory and related areas". She was named to the 2023 class of Fellows of the American Mathematical Society, "for contributions to number theory, including the study of L-functions, and for service to the mathematical community". In 2024, she will become a fellow of the Association for Women in Mathematics, "For her ongoing contributions to the AWM, most notably her leadership role in the Women in Numbers Network and considerable contributions to its growth; her service to the International Mathematics Union Committee for Women; and for her ardent efforts towards making conferences more welcoming and accessible for researchers by actively advocating for childcare resources."
