= William B. T. Trego =

American painter

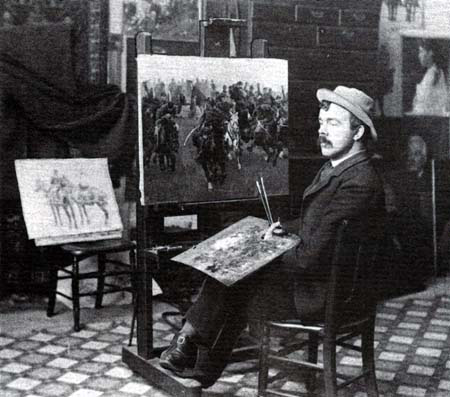
- William B. T. Trego in his studio in 1893
- Born: September 15, 1858; Yardley, Pennsylvania, U.S.
- Died: June 24, 1909; North Wales, Pennsylvania, U.S.
- Education: Jonathan K. Trego, Thomas Eakins, Tony Robert-Fleury, William-Adolphe Bouguereau
- Known for: Painting

William Brooke Thomas Trego (September 15, 1858 – June 24, 1909) was an American painter best known for his historical military subjects, in particular scenes of the American Revolution and Civil War.

== Biography ==
William B. T. Trego was born in Yardley, Bucks County, Pennsylvania, in 1858, the son of the artist Jonathan Kirkbride Trego and Emily Roberts née Thomas. At the age of two William's hands and feet became nearly paralyzed, either from polio, or from a doctor administering a dose of calomel (mercurous chloride). Trego's family moved to Detroit in 1874 where William was enrolled in the local school, but an incident where 16-year-old William burned off all his hair with a gas jet made his father decide to teach William in his studio from then on. Despite his crippled hands, young William showed an aptitude for art, learning to paint with a brush jammed in his right hand while he guided it with his left. William Trego first received public attention when he exhibited a painting titled The Charge of Custer at Winchester in 1879 at the Michigan State Fair. His depiction of George Armstrong Custer's charge at the Third Battle of Winchester was described by the Cleveland Press as "one of the best historical paintings of the kind that has ever been produced by an American artist."

=== Pennsylvania Academy years ===
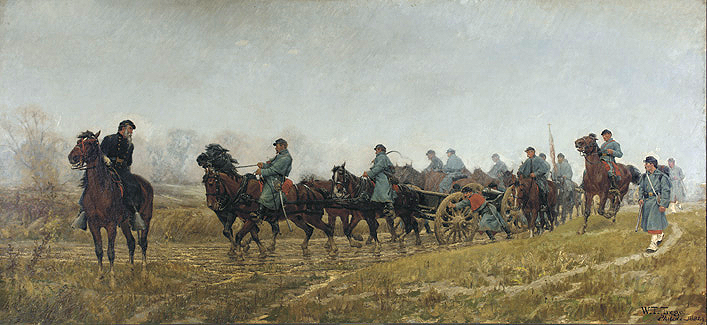
Battery of Light Artillery en Route (1882)

Later that year, Trego used the proceeds from the sale of The Charge of Custer at Winchester to enroll himself at the Pennsylvania Academy of the Fine Arts in Philadelphia, Pennsylvania. He studied at PAFA for three years under Thomas Eakins, in courses that included instruction on aspects of the human figure, including anatomical study of the human and animal body and surgical dissection. Trego did not appreciate Eakins' rigorous, terse teaching style, and would later remark:

"Fortunately for myself I was drilled in the principles of drawing in my father's studio before I went to the Academy, so that I was able to some extent to brave the sarcasm and neglect of Eakins"

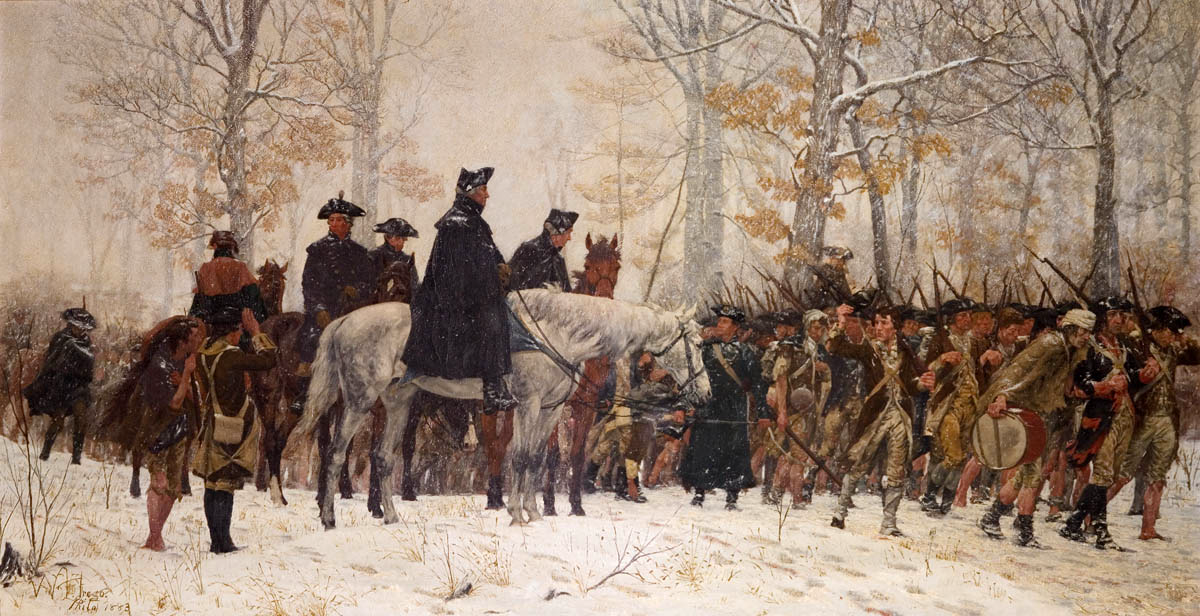
The March to Valley Forge (1883), Museum of the American Revolution

In an 1882 Academy exhibition, Trego won the first Toppan Prize for his work, Battery of Light Artillery en Route, and the painting was subsequently purchased for the Academy by Fairman Rogers. In 1883, Trego received what he thought was a snub from the Academy when the art jury for the Temple Competition of Historical Paintings, a competition intended to help revive historical painting by limiting entries to depictions of the American War of Independence", decided there were no paintings of sufficient quality to merit a 1st or second place, and awarded Trego 3rd place for his painting of George Washington and his troops called The March to Valley Forge. Trego sued the Academy on the grounds that if his painting was the best overall, it should receive first place (and he should get the $3,000 prize money). In 1886, he lost the case, with the Pennsylvania Supreme Court ruling the jury was well within their rights under the contract of the exhibit to award prizes as they saw fit.

=== North Wales studio ===
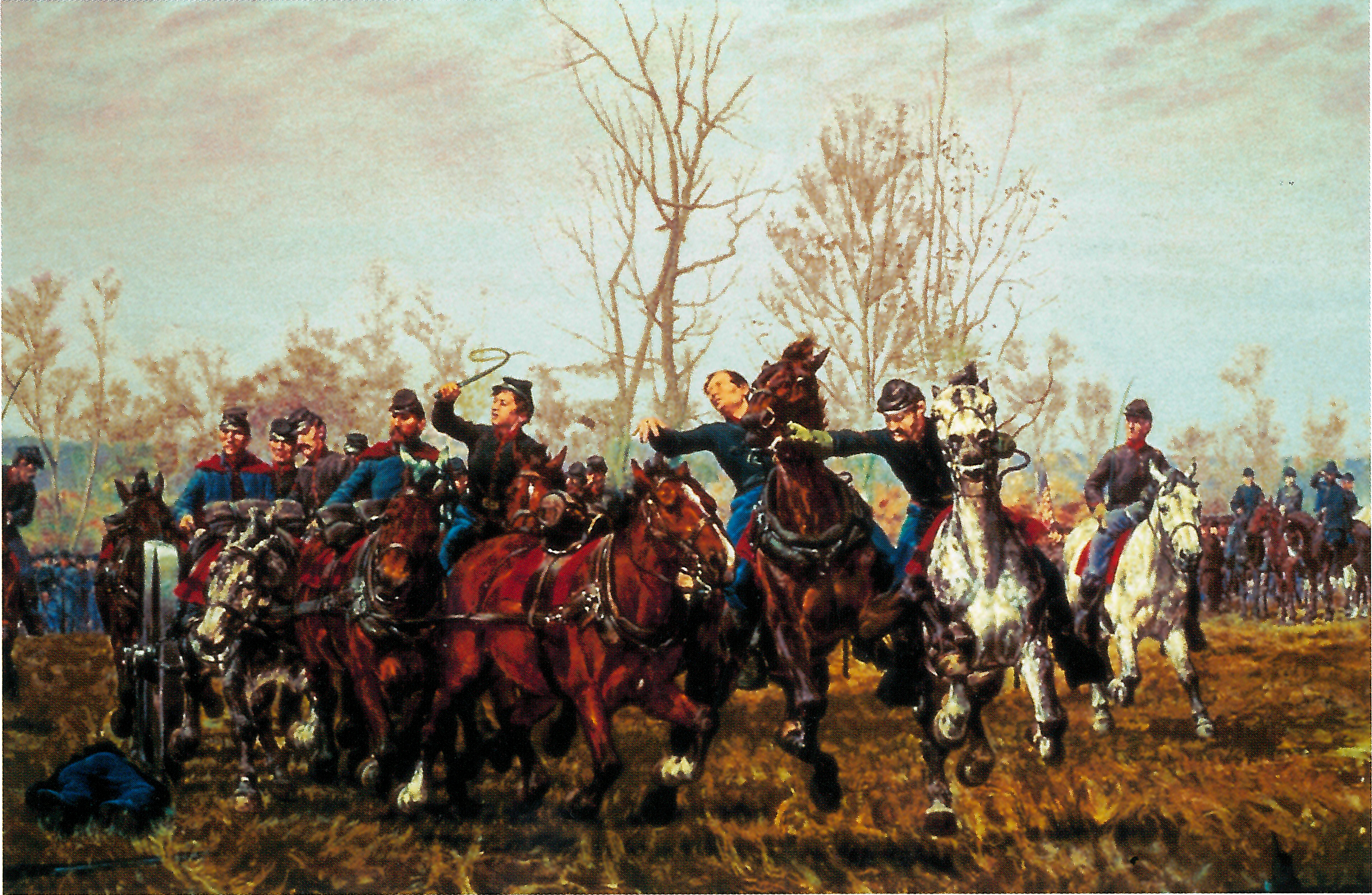
Civil War Battle Scene, (1887) an example of Trego's realistic depiction of battle

After leaving the Academy, Trego lived in North Wales, Pennsylvania, with his mother and father. Except for trips abroad, Trego would live in North Wales for the rest of his life, working in a studio behind his house. He used the town residents, their horses, and the surrounding landscape as models and backdrops for his paintings. Trego was becoming well known for the accuracy of his military depictions as well as the honest, sometimes brutal realism, especially in his Civil War subjects The Civil War works were well received and Trego had much success selling paintings during that time.

=== Paris ===
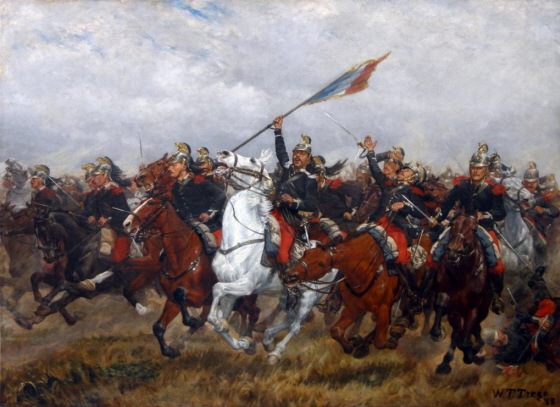
The Color Guard, French dragoons, (1888)

In 1887, he went to Paris to study at the Académie Julian under the French academic painters Tony Robert-Fleury and William-Adolphe Bouguereau. Trego studied at the French museums while he was there and enjoyed the Paris night life with other Pennsylvania Academy alumni such as Robert Henri, Augustus B. Koopman, Henry McCarter, and Frederick J. Waugh. Trego also participated in the Paris Salons of 1889 and 1890, gaining some recognition for his 1889 submission, a military painting titled The End of the Charge of von Bredow’s Brigade at Rezonville depicting German cavalry units charge against French during the Franco-Prussian War. One French writer thought this work put Trego on par with the famous French academic military artist, Édouard Detaille. On his ocean voyage home from Paris in 1890, Trego returned to America not only with new found knowledge of French academic painting, he also returned with a French fiancée. But in a sad and very public event on board ship, the "handsome French girl" (as reported in the newspapers of the time) switched her affections to fellow Académie Julian student James R. Fisher. When they arrived in Philadelphia the news papers reported the two artists as parting "bitter enemies".

=== Later years ===
After his return to the States, Trego's work received much acclaim from critics. In 1891, noted American art collector Thomas Benedict Clarke wrote of Trego:

"In the accomplishment of his work, which is marked by strength, firmness, and force, he has had to overcome physical infirmities that would have made a less brave and earnest character halt at the threshold."

Despite these accolades and the prestige of exhibiting in the Paris Salon, Trego found it hard to sell paintings due to the declining in popularity of realistic military artwork. He painted portraits and genre paintings to make money and took on work doing book and magazine illustration. He also tried unsuccessfully to become an instructor at The Pennsylvania Academy of the Fine Arts. He lived with, and was supported by, his parents during the 1890s. Trego's father died in 1901 and his stepmother died six years later. Trego's increasing financial problems during this time made him take on students including Walter Emerson Baum and his wife, Flora. Trego tried to revive his career by basing a painting on the popular novel Ben Hur with one of his last works, The Chariot Race from Ben Hur (1908). He sent it to the 1909 National Academy of Design exhibition in New York but it failed to spark any interest. William Trego was found unconscious in his studio on June 24, 1909, and was dead by the time the doctor arrived. His obituary in The New York Times reported that he died of "overexertion" due to "excessive heat". The cause of death specified on his death certificate was a supposed suicide by the administration of some unknown poison. The contents of his North Wales studio were left to Walter Emerson Baum.

== Legacy ==
Designations

Pennsylvania Historical Marker
- Official name: William B. T. Trego (1858-1909)
- Type: City
- Criteria: Artists, Military
- Location: 509 E Montgomery Ave., North Wales

During his lifetime, Trego had painted over 200 historical and military paintings. These would become so widely published after his death that writer Edwin Augustus Peeples commented:

"There is probably not an American History book which doesn't have (a) Trego picture in it".

In 1976, Trego's The March to Valley Forge had become such an iconic image of that event that it was reproduced as a souvenir postage sheet issued by the United States Postal Service as part of the observance of the United States Bicentennial. It is currently on loan from the Museum of the American Revolution to Valley Forge National Historical Park.

A book was published about Trego's life, So Bravely and So Well: The Life and Art of William T. Trego, by Joseph P. Eckhardt, in 2011.

== Collections ==
Trego's work is represented in many permanent collections including:

- Illustration for the Century - Smithsonian Institution, Cooper-Hewitt, National Design Museum
- Horse Artillery Going into Battery, Petersburg, Va. and A Mortar Battery Firing - United States Department of the Army, United States Military Academy, West Point Museum
- Battery of Light Artillery En Route - Pennsylvania Academy of the Fine Arts
- The March to Valley Forge (1883) - The American Revolution Center
- The Chariot Race (1908) and Civil War Battle Scene (1887) - James A. Michener Art Museum
- Hancock's Corps Assaulting the Works at the "Bloody Angle" (1887) - Cooper-Hewitt, National Design Museum
- Jonathan K. Trego (1817–1901) and The Rescue of the Colors - Bucks County Historical Society

== Exhibitions and awards ==
- Michigan State Fair, 1879 - The Charge of Custer at Winchester
- Pennsylvania Academy of the Fine Arts, 1882 - Toppan Prize,
- Pennsylvania Academy of the Fine Arts, 1883 - Temple Silver Medal, The March to Valley Forge
- Paris Salon, 1889
- Paris Salon, 1890
- World's Columbian Exposition, 1893
- Cotton States and International Exposition, Atlanta, Georgia
- American Art Society, Silver Medal, 1902
- National Academy of Design exhibition, New York, 1909 - The Chariot Race from Ben Hur
- James A. Michener Art Museum exhibition, Doylestown, PA, 2011 - Various works

== Gallery ==
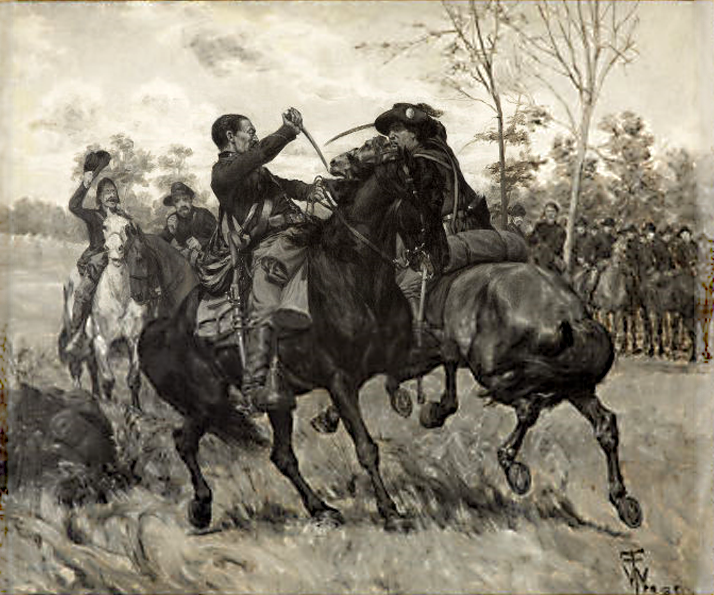
Cavalry Saber Duel (1887)

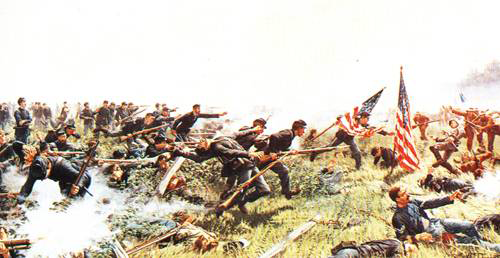
Rescue Of The Colors, (1898)

== See also ==
- Artists of stamps of the United States
