= George Washington's tent =

Campaign tents in the American Revolutionary War

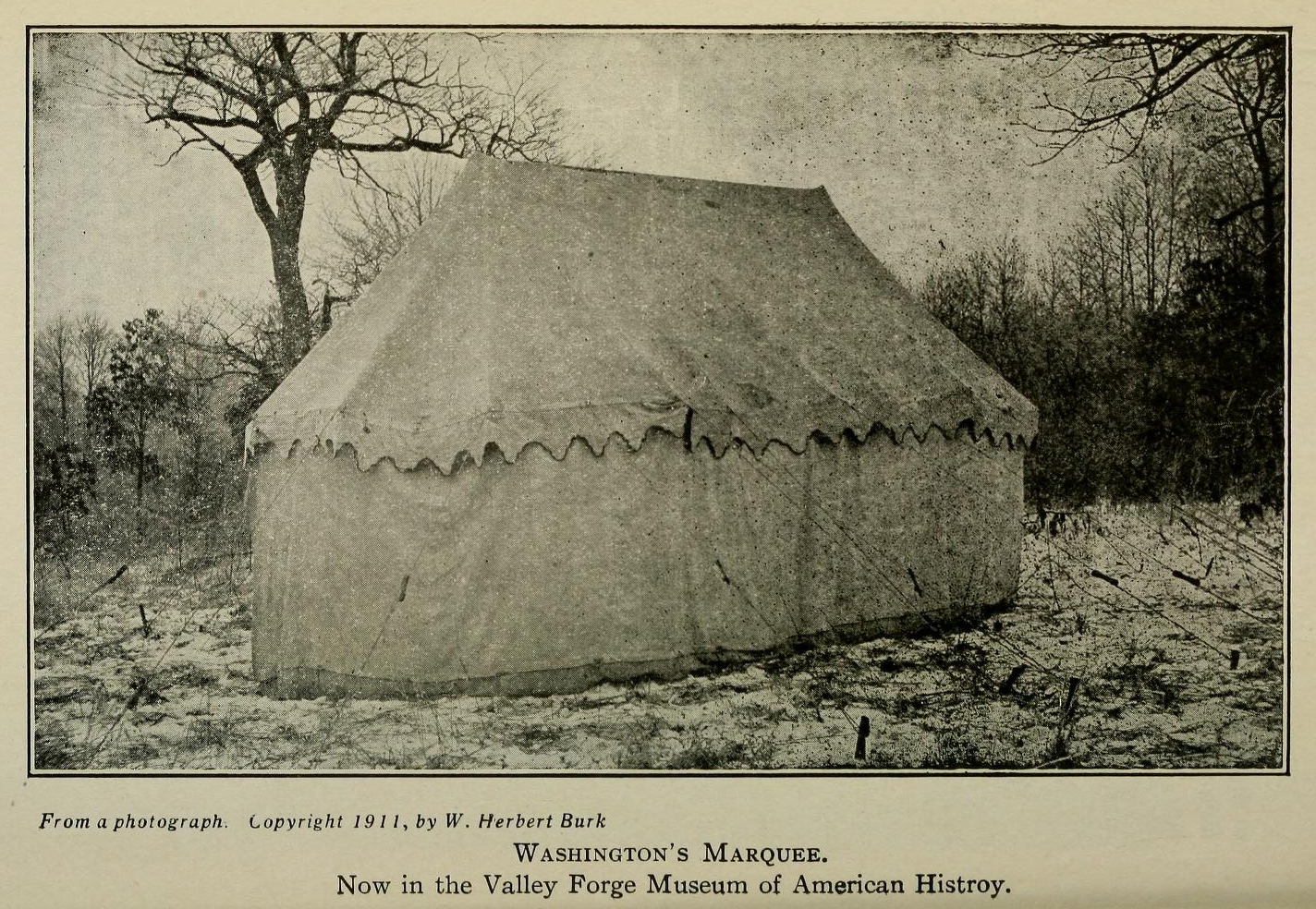
A 1911 photograph of Washington's second office/sleeping tent, now on display at the Museum of the American Revolution in Philadelphia

General George Washington used a pair of campaign tents throughout much of the American Revolutionary War. In warm weather, he used one for dining with his officers and aides, and the other as his military office/sleeping quarters. Canvas panels and poles from both tents survive, and are currently owned by four separate historical organizations.

== Revolutionary War ==
Washington's headquarters staff consisted of his military secretary and (usually) four aides-de-camp. The office/sleeping tent was their workplace, where they managed the commander-in-chief's correspondence and made copies of his orders. A divided section of the tent was where Washington slept. His enslaved valet William Lee also slept there. The dining tent was used for meals. Washington's first pair of campaign tents were made by Philadelphia upholsterer Plunket Fleeson in Spring 1776. They were used at the first Middlebrook encampment in 1777 and in Washington Valley near Middlebrook, New Jersey:

The Army is now drawn together at this place, at least that part of it, which have been Cantoned all Winter in this state. The whole of them now Encamped in Comfortable Tents on a Valley covered in front and rear by ridges which affords us security. His excellency our good Old General, has also spread his Tent, and lives amongst us.

The first pair of tents were used until the end of the 1777–78 winter encampment at Valley Forge. New tents were ordered by Deputy Quartermaster General James Abeel in June 1778, but the maker was not identified.

There were two marquées attached to the headquarters during all the campaigns. The larger, or banqueting tent, would contain from forty to fifty persons; the smaller, or sleeping tent, had an inner-chamber, where, on a hard cot-bed, the chief reposed. Within its venerable folds, Washington was in the habit of seeking privacy and seclusion, where he could commune with himself, and where he wrote the most memorable of his despatches in the Revolutionary war.

In 2017, Philip Mead, chief historian at the Museum of the American Revolution in Philadelphia, and museum curators determined that a panoramic watercolor painting by Pierre Charles L'Enfant was of the 1782 encampment at Verplanck's Point and depicted the office/sleeping tent in field use.

== Civil War ==
The panels and poles from both tents were inherited by Martha Washington's grandson, George Washington Parke Custis. He passed them on to his daughter, Mary Anna Custis Lee, and her husband, Robert E. Lee. Their enslaved housekeeper, Selina Norris Gray, kept the tent fabric safe when Union Army soldiers ransacked Arlington House during the American Civil War.

The tents were among the Washington artifacts seized by the federal government in January 1862, and the grounds of Arlington House were converted into Arlington National Cemetery.

== Later history ==
The tents were exhibited at the U.S. Patent Office, and transferred to the Smithsonian Institution in 1881. It wasn't until 1901, nearly 40 years after their seizure, that the tents and Washington artifacts were returned to the Lees' son, George Washington Custis Lee. In 1906, Robert E. Lee's daughter Mary Custis Lee donated George Washington's military tents for a benefit sale to raise funds for the Home for Needy Confederate Women in Richmond.

In 1909, the exterior of the office/sleeping tent was purchased by Reverend W. Herbert Burk for the Valley Forge Museum of American History, predecessor to the Valley Forge Historical Society. It was exhibited in a museum on the grounds of the 1777–1778 Valley Forge encampment.

== Current locations ==
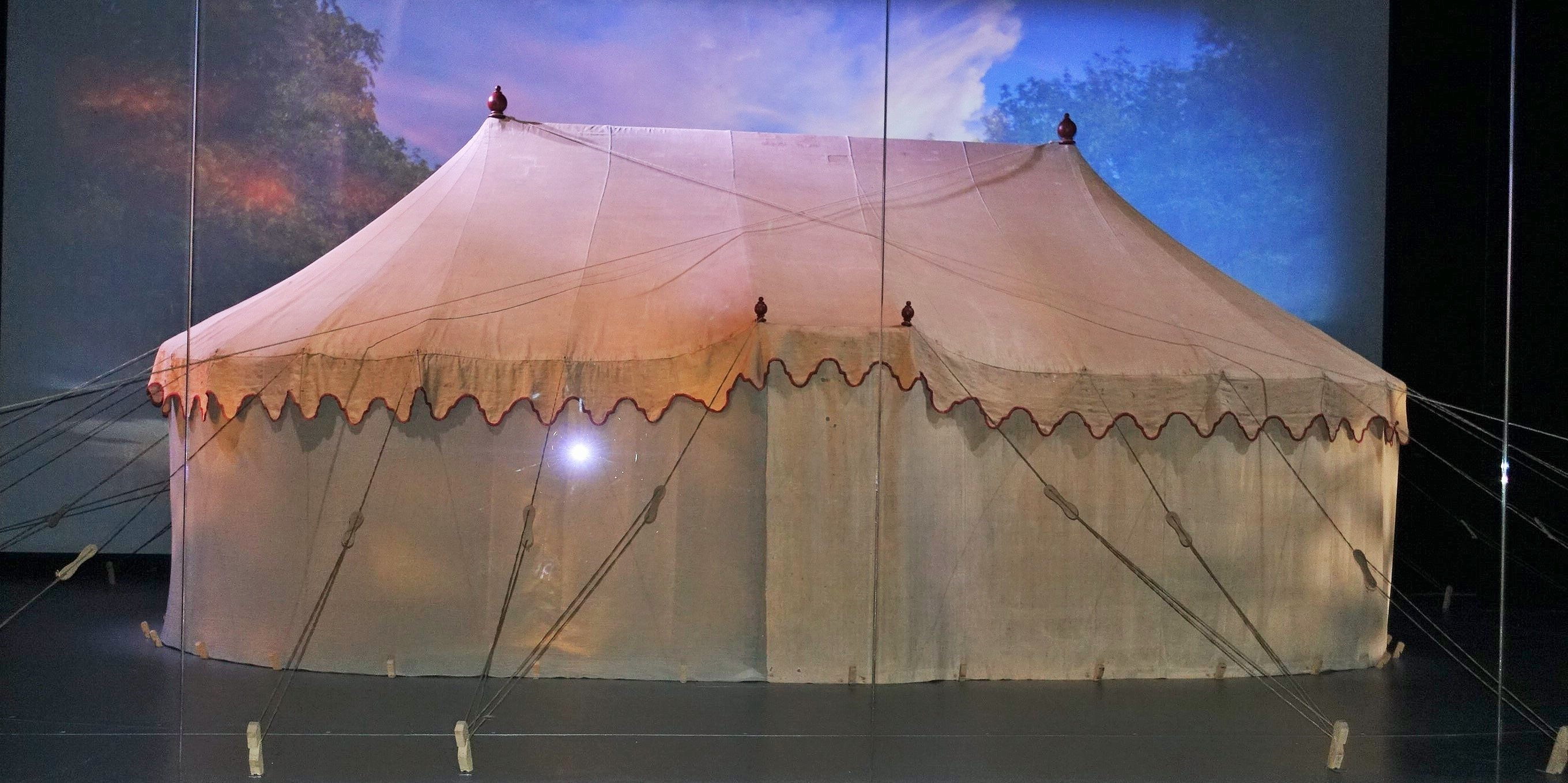
Exterior of Washington's office/sleeping tent on exhibit at the Museum of the American Revolution in Philadelphia, in 2017

Pieces of the tents are currently owned by four different historical organizations:

- Colonial National Historical Park owns the interior of the dining tent roof, the office/sleeping tent interior, and the poles of the office/sleeping tent. All of these items are currently on display at the Yorktown Battlefield Visitor Center.
- The Mount Vernon Ladies' Association owns the linen door to the office/sleeping tent.
- The Museum of the American Revolution in Philadelphia owns the exterior of the office/sleeping tent, poles of the dining tent, and a storage trunk. Sometimes described as the first "Oval Office", the tent is exhibited at the new Museum of the American Revolution, opened April 19, 2017.

== See also ==
- List of Washington's Headquarters during the Revolutionary War
- Washington at Verplanck's Point – 1790 painting by John Trumbull
- List of George Washington articles
