= Kanta Gupta =

Canadian mathematician (1938–2016)

- Education: Aligarh Muslim University; Australian National University
- Awards: Krieger–Nelson Prize

Chander Kanta Gupta FRSC (8 October 1938 – 27 March 2016) was a Canadian distinguished professor of mathematics at the University of Manitoba, known for her research in abstract algebra and group theory. Much of her research concerns the automorphisms in different varieties of groups.

== Education ==
Gupta earned a bachelor's degree from the University of Jammu and Kashmir, a master's degree from the Aligarh Muslim University, another master's degree from the Australian National University, and a Ph.D. in 1967 from ANU under the supervision of Michael Frederick Newman.

== Recognition ==
She was elected to the Royal Society of Canada in 1991, and awarded the Krieger–Nelson Prize of the Canadian Mathematical Society in 2000.

== Personal ==
Her husband, Narain Gupta (1936–2008) was also an ANU alumnus, and a distinguished professor of mathematics at the University of Manitoba.
