= Jane Ye =

Chinese-Canadian mathematician

- Born: China
- Education: Dalhousie University
- Known for: Variational analysis
- Scientific career
- Fields: Mathematics
- Workplaces: University of Victoria
- Doctoral advisor: Michael Dempster

Jane Ye (Chinese: 叶娟娟) is a Chinese-Canadian mathematician who works as a professor of mathematics at University of Victoria. Her interests include variational analysis and optimization constraint problems. She is the 2015 winner of the Krieger–Nelson Prize, given annually by the Canadian Mathematical Society to an outstanding female researcher in mathematics.

Ye was born in China and received her B.Sc. from Xiamen University in 1982. She completed her doctorate in applied mathematics in 1990 at Dalhousie University, under the supervision of Michael Dempster. From 1990 to 1992, she was a postdoctoral researcher at the Centre de Recherches Mathématiques in Montreal, under the supervision of Francis Clarke, before joining the faculty of University of Victoria in 1992 as an NSERC Women's Faculty Award Holder. She was promoted to associate professor in 1997 and to full professor in 2002.
