= Guillemain =

Guillemain is a surname. Notable people with the surname include:

- Éric Guillemain, French photographer
- Juan Cruz Guillemaín (born 1992), Argentine rugby player
- Louis-Gabriel Guillemain (1705–1770), French composer

== See also ==
- Guillemin
