= Cecilia Krieger =

Mathematician

Cecilia Krieger

Cypra Cecilia Krieger-Dunaij (9 April 1894 – 17 August 1974) was an Austro-Hungarian (more specifically, Galician)-born mathematician of Jewish ancestry who lived and worked in Canada. Krieger has the distinction of being the third person in Canadian history to complete from any Canadian university a PhD in any discipline. She was the first woman PhD candidate to complete her degree in mathematics. She did it in 1930 at the University of Toronto. Krieger is well known for having translated two works of Wacław Sierpiński in general topology. She and Evelyn Nelson have been commemorated since 1995 by the Krieger–Nelson Prize, awarded annually by the Canadian Mathematical Society to recognize outstanding research by a female mathematician.

== Early life and education ==
Krieger was born on 9 April 1894 in Jasło in Galicia. The town was then part of Austria-Hungary, now in modern-day Poland. Her parents, Moses and Sarah Krieger, had two sons and two daughters besides Cecilia. Krieger began in 1919 the study of mathematics and physics at the University of Vienna When the family moved to Toronto, Ontario, Canada in 1920, Krieger would complete a BA (1924) and an MA (1925) at the University of Toronto, followed by a PhD (1930). Her thesis, under the supervision of W.J. Webber, was entitled "On the summability of trigonometric series with localized parameters—on Fourier constants and convergence factors of double Fourier series".

== At the University of Toronto ==
During her PhD programme, Krieger was appointed as an instructor (1928), until she completed the PhD when she was promoted a lecturer (1930). She continued as a lecturer until 1942 when she was promoted a assistant professor teaching in the departments of engineering and mathematics. Marriage would follow in 1953 Dr. Zygmund Dunaij.

== Retirement ==
Krieger retired as an assistant professor in 1962 but she continued teaching there for another five years, leaving in 1968 upon the death of her husband. She then taught for six years at Upper Canada College, a private school in Toronto, until her own death in 1974.

== Publications ==
In 1934, Krieger published an English translation of Sierpinski's book Introduction to General Topology. She also translated General Topology by Sierpinski in 1952, adding a 30-page appendix on infinite cardinals and ordinals.

== Recognition ==
Krieger was a strong supporter of women in mathematics. In honour of the contributions of Krieger and Evelyn Nelson, the Canadian Mathematical Society created the Krieger–Nelson Prize in 1995. It is awarded to an outstanding woman in mathematics.
