= Krieger–Nelson Prize =

The Krieger–Nelson Prize is presented by the Canadian Mathematical Society in recognition of an outstanding woman in mathematics. It was first awarded in 1995. The award is named after Cecilia Krieger and Evelyn Nelson, both known for their contributions to mathematics in Canada.

== Recipients ==
While the award has largely been awarded to a female mathematician working at a Canadian University, it has also been awarded to Canadian-born or -educated women working outside of the country. For example, Cathleen Morawetz, past president of the American Mathematical Society, and a faculty member at the Courant Institute of Mathematical Sciences (a division of New York University) was awarded the Krieger–Nelson Prize in 1997. (Morawetz was educated at the University of Toronto in Toronto, Canada). According to the call for applications, the award winner should be a "member of the Canadian mathematical community".

The recipient of the Krieger–Nelson Prize delivers a lecture to the Canadian Mathematical Society, typically during its summer meeting.

- 1995 Nancy Reid
- 1996 Olga Kharlampovich
- 1997 Cathleen Synge Morawetz
- 1998 Catherine Sulem
- 1999 Nicole Tomczak-Jaegermann
- 2000 Kanta Gupta
- 2001 Lisa Jeffrey
- 2002 Cindy Greenwood
- 2003 Leah Keshet
- 2004 Not Awarded
- 2005 Barbara Keyfitz
- 2006 Penny Haxell
- 2007 Pauline van den Driessche
- 2008 Izabella Łaba
- 2009 Yael Karshon
- 2010 Lia Bronsard
- 2011 Rachel Kuske
- 2012 Ailana Fraser
- 2013 Chantal David
- 2014 Gail Wolkowicz
- 2015 Jane Ye
- 2016 Malabika Pramanik
- 2017 Stephanie van Willigenburg
- 2018 Megumi Harada
- 2019 Julia Gordon
- 2020 Sujatha Ramdorai
- 2021 Anita Layton
- 2022 Matilde Lalín
- 2023 Johanna G. Nešlehová
- 2024 Renate Scheidler
- 2025 Emmy Murphy

== See also ==
- List of mathematics awards
