= Megumi Harada =

Canadian mathematician

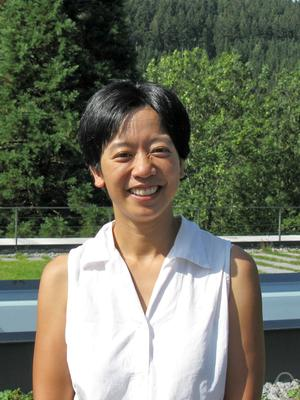
Megumi Harada

Megumi Harada is a mathematician who works as a professor in the department of mathematics and statistics at McMaster University, where she holds a tier-two Canada Research Chair in Equivariant Symplectic and Algebraic Geometry.

== Research ==
Harada's research involves the symmetries of symplectic spaces and their connections to other areas of mathematics including algebraic geometry, representation theory, K-theory, and algebraic combinatorics.

== Education and career ==
Harada graduated in 1996 from Harvard University, with a bachelor's degree in mathematics. She completed her doctorate in 2003 from the University of California, Berkeley. Her dissertation, The Symplectic Geometry of the Gel'fand-Cetlin-Molev Basis for Representations of Sp(2n, C), concerned symplectic geometry and was supervised by Allen Knutson.

After postdoctoral studies at the University of Toronto, she joined the McMaster faculty in 2006.

== Recognition ==
In 2013, Harada won the Ruth I. Michler Memorial Prize of the Association for Women in Mathematics, funding her travel to Cornell University for research collaborations with Reyer Sjamar, Tara S. Holm, and Allen Knutson. She was given her Canada Research Chair in 2014. She is the 2018 winner of the Krieger–Nelson Prize "for her research on Newton–Okounkov bodies, Hessenberg varieties, and their relationships to symplectic geometry, combinatorics, and equivariant topology, among others".

She was elected as a Fellow of the American Mathematical Society, in the 2025 class of fellows.
