= Ernst Guillemin =

American electrical engineer (1898–1970)

Ernst Adolph Guillemin
- Born: May 8, 1898; Milwaukee, Wisconsin
- Died: April 1, 1970 (aged 71)
- Education: LMU Munich, MIT, University of Wisconsin-Madison
- Awards: IRE Medal of Honor (1961); IEEE James H. Mulligan, Jr. Education Medal (1962)
- Scientific career
- Workplaces: Massachusetts Institute of Technology
- Doctoral advisor: Arnold Sommerfeld
- Doctoral students: Robert Fano; Thomas Stockham; William Linvill; John Linvill; Samuel J. Mason

Ernst Adolph Guillemin (May 8, 1898 – April 1, 1970) was an American electrical engineer and computer scientist at the Massachusetts Institute of Technology who spent his career extending the art and science of linear network analysis and synthesis. His nephew Victor Guillemin is a math professor at MIT, his nephew Robert Charles Guillemin was a sidewalk artist, his great-niece Karen Guillemin is a biology professor at the University of Oregon, and his granddaughter Mary Elizabeth Meyerand is a Medical Physics Professor at the University of Wisconsin-Madison.

== Biography ==
Guillemin was born in 1898, in Milwaukee, and received his B.S. (1922) and S.M. (1924) degrees in electrical engineering from the University of Wisconsin–Madison and MIT, respectively. He then attended the Ludwig-Maximilians-Universität München (LMU Munich), under Arnold Sommerfeld, on a Saltonstall Traveling Fellowship. He was granted his doctorate in 1926, whereupon he returned to MIT as an instructor, becoming Assistant Professor in 1928, Associate Professor in 1936, and Professor in Electrical Communications in 1944. In 1960, he was appointed to the MIT Edwin Sibley Webster Chair of Electrical Engineering, a title he held until his retirement in 1963.

On the invitation of Edward L. Bowles in 1928, Guillemin was invited to assist in the development of a communications option for undergraduate students. In this effort, he revised and expanded a subject that included communication transmission lines, telephone repeaters, balancing networks, and filter theory. Thus began his lifelong career of developing and refining linear, lumped, finite, passive, and bilateral networks in the sphere of teaching.

Guillemin was appointed consultant to the Microwave Committee of the National Defense Research Committee in 1940. As such, he spent about half of his time consulting with groups in the MIT Radiation Laboratory. He took over administrative responsibility of the Communications Option in the MIT Department of Electrical Engineering, in 1941.

During his career, Guillemin influenced many undergraduate and graduate students who went on to contribute greatly in industry and academia; included in the list are his graduate students Robert Fano and Thomas Stockham. His professional contributions were recognized internationally with numerous honors and awards.

Memberships

- Fellow of the American Academy of Arts and Sciences (1955)
- Fellow of the American Institute of Electrical Engineers
- Fellow of the Institute of Radio Engineers
- Foreign Fellow of the British Royal Society of Arts

Honors

- 1948 – President's Certificate of Merit for his outstanding contributions during World War II
- 1961 – IRE Medal of Honor from the Institute of Radio Engineers
- 1962 – American Institute of Electrical Engineers Education Medal
- 1960 - Appointed the first Edwin Sibley Webster Professor

== Publications ==
Ernst A. Guillemin has written several books:

- 1931. Communication Networks (Wiley)
- 1935. Communication Networks: Vol. II The Classical Theory of Long Lines, Filters and Related Networks (Wiley)
- 1941. Notes for Principles of Electrical Communications 6.30 (MIT)
- 1944. The Mathematics of Circuit Analysis: Vol. 1 Reference Volumes for Collateral Study - Principles of Electrical Engineering Series (Department of Electrical Engineering, MIT)
- 1953. Introductory Circuit Theory (Wiley)
- 1957. Synthesis of Passive Networks: Theory and Methods Appropriate to the Realization and Approximation Problems (Wiley)
- 1960. Linear System Theory (Guillemin)
- 1963. Theory of Linear Physical Systems: Theory of Physical Systems from the Viewpoint of Classical Dynamics, Including Fourier Methods (Wiley)
- 1963. Theory of Linear Physical Systems (Wiley)
- 1969. The Mathematics of Circuit Analysis: Extensions to the Mathematical Training of Electrical Engineers - Principles of Electrical Engineering Series (MIT)
