= Victor Guillemin =

American mathematician

Victor W. Guillemin
- Born: 1937 (age 88–89); Boston
- Education: Harvard University
- Children: Karen Guillemin; Anna Guillemin
- Awards: Sloan Research Fellowship (1969); Guggenheim Fellowship (1988); Humboldt fellowship (1996); Leroy P. Steele Prize (2003)
- Scientific career
- Fields: Differential geometry
- Workplaces: Massachusetts Institute of Technology
- Thesis: Theory of Finite G-Structures (1962)
- Doctoral advisor: Shlomo Sternberg
- Doctoral students: Ana Cannas da Silva; Rebecca Goldin; Marty Golubitsky; Tara S. Holm; Allen Knutson; Gunther Uhlmann

Victor William Guillemin (born 1937 in Boston) is an American mathematician. He works at the Massachusetts Institute of Technology in the field of symplectic geometry, and he has also made contributions to the fields of microlocal analysis, spectral theory, and mathematical physics.

== Education and career ==
Guillemin obtained a B.A. at Harvard University in 1959, as well as an M. A. at the University of Chicago in 1960. He received a Ph.D. in mathematics from Harvard University in 1962; his dissertation, entitled Theory of Finite G-Structures, was written under the direction of Shlomo Sternberg.

He worked at Columbia University from 1963 to 1966 and then moved to the Massachusetts Institute of Technology as assistant professor. He became associate professor in 1969 and full professor in 1973.

== Awards and honors ==
Guillemin was awarded in 1969 a Sloan Research Fellowship, in 1988 a Guggenheim fellowship and in 1996 a Humboldt fellowship. In 1970 he was invited speaker at the International Congress of Mathematicians in Nice.

He was elected a fellow of the American Academy of Arts and Sciences in 1984 and of the United States National Academy of Sciences in 1985. In 2003, he was awarded the Leroy P. Steele Prize for Lifetime Achievement by the American Mathematical Society. In 2012 he became a fellow of the American Mathematical Society.

== Research ==
Guillemin worked in several areas in analysis and geometry, including microlocal analysis, symplectic group actions, and spectral theory of elliptic operators on manifolds.

He is the author or co-author of numerous books and monographs, including a widely used textbook on differential topology, written jointly with Alan Pollack in 1974, and a monograph on symplectic geometry in physics, written jointly with Shlomo Sternberg in 1986.

== Family ==
Victor Guillemins's uncle Ernst Guillemin was a Professor of Electrical Engineering and Computer Science at MIT, his younger brother Robert Charles Guillemin was a sidewalk artist, his brother-in-law Ray Raphael is an historian, and his daughter Karen Guillemin is a Professor of Biology at the University of Oregon.

== Selected publications ==
- Guillemin, Victor & Pollack, Alan (1974). Differential topology. New York, NY: Prentice-Hall. ISBN 978-0-13-212605-2.
- Golubitsky, Martin and Guillemin, Victor (1974). Stable mappings and their singularities. New York, NY: Springer-Verlag. ISBN 978-0-387-90073-5.
- Guillemin, Victor & Sternberg, Shlomo (1977). Geometric asymptotics. Providence, RI: American Mathematical Society. ISBN 0-8218-1514-8.; reprinted in 1990 as an on-line book
- Guillemin, Victor (1976). "The Radon transform on Zoll surfaces". Advances in Mathematics. 22 (1): 85–119. doi:10.1016/0001-8708(76)90139-0.
- Guillemin, Victor & Sternberg, Shlomo (1986). Symplectic techniques in physics. Cambridge U. Press. ISBN 0-521-24866-3; xi+468 p.
- Guillemin, Victor (1989). Cosmology in (2+1)-dimensions, cyclic models, and deformations of M_{2,1} by Victor Guillemin. Princeton, N.J.: Princeton University Press. ISBN 0-691-08513-7.

== See also ==
- Zoll surface
