= Karen Guillemin =

American microbiologist

- Education: Harvard University; Stanford University
- Known for: Microbiome and bacterial pathogenesis
- Awards: Burroughs Wellcome Fund Career Award in Biomedical Sciences (2001); American Academy of Microbiology (2016); American Academy of Arts and Sciences (2020)
- Scientific career
- Workplaces: University of Oregon
- Website: biology.uoregon.edu/profile/kguillem/

Karen Guillemin is an American microbiologist known for her work on the role of bacteria in influencing animal development and health. She trained with renowned microbiologist Stanley Falkow, studying how the stomach bacterium Helicobacter pylori interacts with gastric epithelial cells. She joined the University of Oregon faculty in 2001, where she continued her work on H. pylori and gained widespread recognition for developing zebrafish as a model organism to study the effects of the microbiome on animal development and health. In 2012, she co-founded the Microbial Ecology and Theory of Animals (META) Center for Host-Microbe Systems Biology. She currently serves as the Phillip H. Knight Chair and Professor of Biology in the Institute of Molecular Biology at the University of Oregon and has published over 100 scientific papers.

== Honors and awards ==
In 2015, Guillemin was named as a Senior Fellow of the Canadian Institute for Advanced Research, Humans & the Microbiome Program. In 2016, Guillemin was elected as a fellow of the American Academy of Microbiology. She was elected to the American Academy of Arts and Sciences and American Association for the Advancement of Science in 2020.

== Family ==
Karen Guillemin is a daughter of MIT math professor Victor Guillemin, a great-niece of MIT electrical-engineering professor Ernst Guillemin, and a niece of street artist Robert Charles Guillemin.
