= Sidewalk Sam =

American pavement artist (1939–2015)

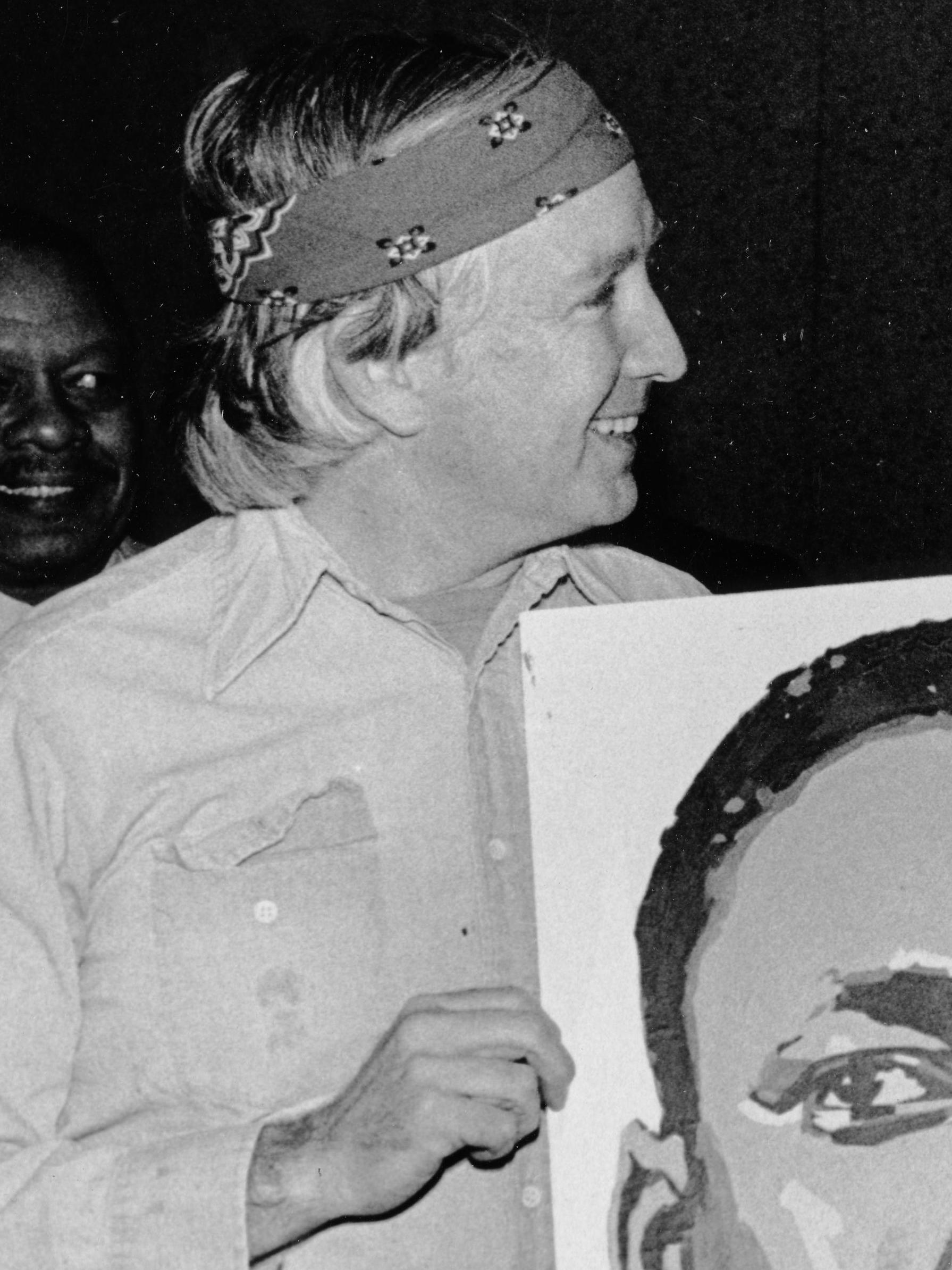
- circa 1984-87
- Born: Robert Charles Guillemin; May 4, 1939
- Died: January 26, 2015 (aged 75); Newton, Massachusetts, United States
- Education: Boston College; University of Illinois; École des Beaux-Arts; Académie de la Grande Chaumière
- Alma mater: Boston University (BFA, MFA)
- Known for: Sidewalk reproductions of European art Participatory art

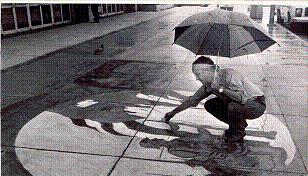
Sidewalk Sam staving off a light rain with an umbrella as he finishes his artwork (c. 1976–1978)

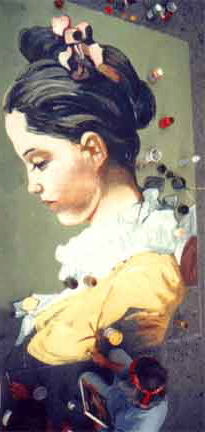
Robert C. Guillemin uses acrylic paint to copy a detail of The Reader by French painter Jean-Honoré Fragonard

Sidewalk Sam was the pseudonym of Robert Charles Guillemin (May 4, 1939 – January 26, 2015), a Boston-based artist who resided in Newton, Massachusetts. He was best recognized for his reproductions of European masterpieces, chalked or painted on the sidewalk. Following an accident in 1994 that left him paralyzed, Guillemin increased his focus on large participatory art projects for communities and businesses. His motto, on a sticky note at the top of his computer, was "Entertain, Inspire, Empower and Unite".

== History ==
Guillemin first took to the streets of Boston and Cambridge, Massachusetts in the summer of 1973, drawing famous artworks on crowded street corners where passersby filled a bucket with change. By the early 1980s, Guillemin found business sponsors for his street artworks and shifted to longer-lasting acrylic paints. Throughout the 1980s and 1990s, Guillemin also organized chalk-drawing festivals, open-air art exhibits, and public art events that engaged participants in the creation of large mosaics, murals, and banners. In 1990 and 1991, Guillemin organized the Boston Artists’ Summer Festival.

In 1994 Guillemin fell 30 feet (9.1 m) from the roof of his home which paralyzed him from the chest down and made him into a wheelchair user. After his accident, Guillemin returned to street painting and continued to organize participatory art events in Boston and internationally. He appeared on the Today show and Good Morning America, and was featured in People magazine, the New York Times, Carnegie magazine, and a high school social studies textbook.

Mr. Guillemin died in his sleep at his home in Newton on January 26, 2015, at age 75.

== Education ==
As an undergraduate Guillemin attended Boston College, the University of Illinois, and finally, Boston University, where he received a Bachelor of Fine Arts (BFA) in 1962. While at Boston College, he also attended courses at the School of the Museum of Fine Arts (a.k.a. Boston Museum School).

After graduation from Boston University he traveled to Paris and attended courses at the École des Beaux-Arts and the Académie de la Grande Chaumière. Starting in 1965, Guillemin studied for his master's degree in painting at Boston University, where Walter Tandy Murch (1907–1967) was the chief graduate painting faculty. Guillemin received his MFA in 1967.

== Solo exhibitions ==
- Structural Surfaces, April 1971, the Rose Art Museum at Brandeis University
- Quick Sketches, December 1971, the Institute of Contemporary Art on Beacon Street in Boston

== Group exhibitions ==
- Flush with the Walls, June 15, 1971, Boston Museum of Fine Arts. Guillemin worked with a group of five artists (Kristin Johnson, Todd McKie, Martin Mull, David Raymond, and Jo Sandman) to stage a protest event/exhibition in a men's restroom located in the museum's lower level.

== Awards and recognitions ==
- Official Screever of the Commonwealth of Massachusetts, 1984

== Family ==
Computer scientist Ernst Guillemin was his uncle, and he was the younger brother of MIT mathematician Victor W. Guillemin, recipient in 2003 of the American Mathematical Society's Leroy P. Steele Prize for Lifetime Achievement. His brother-in-law is revolutionary historian Ray Raphael. Microbiologist Karen Guillemin is one of his nieces.
