= Philip Mead (historian) =

American historian

Dr. Philip C. Mead, an American historian specializing in the period of the American Revolution, is Chief Historian and Curator of the Museum of the American Revolution in Philadelphia.

Mead served as a project historian for exhibition development beginning in 2011, and joined the museum staff as historian and curator in 2014. He co-curated the museum's award-winning core exhibition, and helped to shape the media experiences and public programs. He then led the collections and exhibitions team through five special exhibitions, including most recently, When Women Lost the Vote: A Revolutionary Story, 1776-1807, which broke new ground by identifying the names of large numbers of women voters in early New Jersey.

Mead earned a doctorate in American history from Harvard University in 2012. Mead's doctoral dissertation, Melancholy Landscapes: Writing Warfare in the American Revolution, was written under Laurel Thatcher Ulrich and read by Jill Lepore, and draws on the diaries of 169 Revolutionary Army soldiers. Mead previously served as a lecturer at Harvard University from 2012 to 2014. In 2016, he co-edited with Gordon S. Wood a book of essays, Essays by “The Free Republican,” 1784–1786.

In 2014, Mead rediscovered and authenticated George Washington's silk shoulder ribbon in the Harvard University collections. In 2017, Mead discovered the only known period image of General George Washington's Revolutionary War tent in the field. In 2019, he led the team that discovered poll lists featuring the names of women and Black men who voted in New Jersey in the years following the Revolutionary War.
