= Ray Raphael =

American historian

- Born: New York City
- Education: Reed College; University of California, Berkeley
- Occupation: Writer Historian

Ray Raphael (born April 19, 1943) is an American historian and author of twenty books. He is noted for his work on the American Revolution, the Constitution, and the regional history of Northern California.

== American Revolution ==
In 2001, Raphael's People's History of the American Revolution synthesized the "bottom-up" history that grabbed the attention of scholars in the field since the 1960s. Howard Zinn, author of People's History of the United States, endorsed the book and used it to initiate his "People's History" series, published by The New Press. While both Raphael and Zinn view common people as significant historical agents, Zinn's focus is decidedly more political, focusing on dissent and protest, while Raphael deals with everyday experiences as well as interesting social movements.

In 2002, in The First American Revolution, Raphael chronicled the overthrow of British authority in the hinterlands of Massachusetts in 1774, the year before Lexington and Concord. The dynamics of the buildup to war have been generally overlooked in America's core national narrative, but Raphael showed how the citizens of Massachusetts, in response to being disenfranchised by the Massachusetts Government Act, seized political and military power throughout the province in dramatic form. In the town of Worcester, 4,622 militiamen from 37 towns throughout the county—half the adult male population—lined both sides of Main Street and forced the British appointed officials to walk the gauntlet between them, hats in hand, reciting their resignations 30 times apiece. Similar takeovers occurred in every county seat outside Boston, which was garrisoned by British troops. These events, well documented at the time but dropped from the national narrative since the mid-19th century, provide fuller context for the outbreak of war. Raphael demonstrated that the British march on Lexington and Concord, rather than "starting" the Revolution, signaled a counteroffensive to regain control of a province that American patriots had already seized.

Alerted by the disappearance of the 1774 Massachusetts rebellion from history texts, Raphael explored the underpinnings of our national storytelling. In 2004, his Founding Myths examined thirteen time-honored tales—Paul Revere's Ride, the Winter at Valley Forge, "Give me liberty or give me death," etc.—and detailed their etymology in the 19th century, when an emerging nationalism and narrative demands combined to alter the historical record.

In 2009, in Founders: The People Who Brought You a Nation, Raphael developed an original synthesis of the Founding Era, blending his previous bottom-up approach into the traditional national narrative. His seven lead characters—some high, some low—include both General George Washington and Private Joseph Plumb Martin, and both Robert Morris, so rich that he bailed out the bankrupt nation, and Thomas Young, a peripatetic revolutionary who spread rebellion in seven states.

== Constitution ==
Raphael next turned to histories of the Constitution: President: How and Why the Founders Created a Chief Executive (2012) and Constitutional Myths: What We Get Wrong and How to Get It Right (2013). His The U. S. Constitution: The Citizen's Annotated Edition (2016) walked readers through the document clause-by- clause and amendment-by- amendment. What was the intent of the framers? How was it understood back then, and how is it interpreted today? Interweaving historical and contemporary contexts, he translated "Constitution-ese" for our time. Working with the Constitutional Sources Project (ConSource), Raphael has developed a series of interactive lesson plans—"Choosing to Make a Nation"—in which students participate in debates as delegates to the Constitutional Convention or members of Congress in the Early Republic.

== Early books ==
Raphael's first books focused primarily on the history and regional issues of Northern California, where he has lived since the late 1960s. His Everyday History of Somewhere, an earthy treatment based on interviews with old-timers that intermingled natural with human history, won the California Commonwealth Club award for best book on California for 1974. In Edges: Human Ecology of the Backcountry; Tree Talk: The People and Politics of Timber (and its sequel, More Tree Talk: The People, Politics, and Economics of Timber); and Cash Crop: An American Dream?, he explored issues of contemporary local concern (development, timber, marijuana) in a unique journalistic style, interweaving Studs Terkel-style interviews with narrative history and analysis. In 2007, with Freeman House (author of Totem Salmon), Raphael wrote an in-depth exploration of white-Indian conflicts of the mid-19th century in Northwest California, titled Two Peoples, One Place.

Raphael has also written a book on male initiation rites in contemporary American culture (The Men from the Boys), a study of the careers of teachers (The Teachers' Voice), and with his son Neil, a juvenile mystery (Comic Cops). His play on John and Jessie Freemont played to audiences across Northern California.

== Editorial work ==
In 2006 Raphael edited an issue on the Founders for Forum magazine that included original contributions from scholars Gary Nash, Alfred F. Young, Gordon Wood, Pauline Maier, Richard Beeman, Woody Holton, Carol Berkin, and Jack Rakove. In 2011, with Gary Nash and Alfred F. Young, he edited Revolutionary Founders: Rebels, Radicals, and Reformer in the Making of the Nation, a collection of original biographical essays by 22 scholars. He is currently an associate editor for Journal of the American Revolution.

== Personal life ==
A native of New York City, Raphael moved west after graduating high school. He holds BA and MAT degrees from Reed College and an MA (in Political Philosophy) from the University of California at Berkeley. He spent the summer of 1962 in North Carolina registering black voters and integrating public facilities and the summer of 1964 with the Student Nonviolent Coordinating Committee's "Freedom Summer" in Mississippi. His work in the "Movement" of the sixties influenced his grassroots journalistic style and his bottom-up telling of history.

Raphael settled in rural Northern California, where he raised two sons with his wife, Marie. (One of Marie's brothers, Robert Guillemin, is Boston's well-known street artist, Sidewalk Sam, whose bottom-up approach to art resembles Raphael's treatment of history.) Since age 50, Raphael has been a recreational whitewater kayaker.

For fifteen years Raphael taught all subjects except foreign language at a one-room public high school in his remote neighborhood. He also taught at Humboldt State University and College of the Redwoods.

== Published works ==
- An Everyday History of Somewhere (Alfred A. Knopf, 1974)
- Edges: Human Ecology of the Backcountry (Alfred A. Knopf, 1976; University of Nebraska Press, 1986)
- Tree Talk: The People and Politics of Timber (Island Press, 1981)
- Cash Crop: An American Dream? (Ridge-Times Press, 1985)
- The Teachers' Voice: A Sense of Who We Are (Heinemann, 1985)
- The Men from the Boys: Rites of Passage in Male America (University of Nebraska Press, 1988)
- (With Neil Raphael) Comic Cops (Real Books, 1992)
- Little White Father: Redick McKee on the California Frontier (Humboldt County Historical Society, 1993)
- More Tree Talk: The People, Politics, and Economics of Timber (Island Press, 1994)
- A People's History of the American Revolution (New Press, 2001: HarperCollins, 2002: New Press Revised Edition 2016)
- The First American Revolution: Before Lexington and Concord (New Press, 2002)
- Founding Myths: Stories that Hide our Patriotic Past (The New Press, 2004)
- (With Freeman House) Two Peoples, One Place (Humboldt County Historical Society, 2007)
- Founders: The People Who Brought You a Nation (The New Press, 2009)
- The Complete Idiot's Guide to the Founding Fathers and the Birth of Our Nation (Alpha/Penguin, 2011)
- (Edited with Alfred F. Young and Gary B. Nash) Revolutionary Founders: Rebels, Radicals, and Reformer in the Making of the Nation (Alfred A. Knopf, 2011)
- Mr. President: How and Why the Founders Created a Chief Executive (Alfred A. Knopf, 2012)
- Constitutional Myths: What We Get Wrong and How To Get It Right (New Press, 2013)
- Founding Myths: Stories That Hide Our Patriotic Past Tenth Anniversary Edition, Revised and Expanded (The New Press, June, 2014)
- (With Marie Raphael) The Spirit of’74: How the American Revolution Began (The New Press, 2015)
- The U.S. Constitution: The Citizen’s Annotated Edition (Vintage, 2016)
- Hamilton: Founding Father (Barnes & Noble, 2017)
- I Like It Here: Life Stories of Humboldt's Bob McKee (Creative Type, 2022)

Raphael's books have been published in the United Kingdom and translated into German, Portuguese, and Korean.
