= Fernando Tapias Stahelin =

Colombian military officer (1943–2015)

Deputy Minister of Defence
- In office 2009–2010
- President: Álvaro Uribe

Colombia Ambassador to the Dominican Republic
- In office 2002–2004
- President: Álvaro Uribe

Personal details
- Born: July 14, 1943
- Died: September 27, 2015 (aged 72)
- Education: See list

Military service
- Allegiance: Colombia
- Branch/service: Armed infantry
- Years of service: 1961–2002
- Rank: General
- Commands: General Commander of the Military Forces
- Awards: See list

Fernando Tapias Stahelin (born July 14, 1943 - † September 27, 2015) was a General of Colombian Armed Forces. He served as Chairman of the Joint Chiefs of Staff of Colombian Armed Forces from 1998 to 2002, during the presidential term of president Andres Pastrana. After that, he served as ambassador of Colombia in Dominican Republic from 2002 to 2004 and subsequently served as Deputy Minister of Defense for its social and business group for two years from 2009 to 2010 during the presidential term of president Alvaro Uribe. He was in the Colombian Armed Forces for 41 years, achieving all the military ranks all the way up to his appointment as General Commander for the Colombian Armed Forces.

According to magazine Semana, Tapias is remembered as the man who conceived and initiated the military modernization and reorganization program for the Colombian Armed Forces, covering each of the forces: army, aviation and navy. In a period of four years, these organizations had a profound transformation as a result of a carefully planned process of reengineering, which was fundamental for Colombia to be able to overcome a serious security crisis that had lasted for over forty years. This was a fundamental key that helped increase the necessary trust between the governments of Colombia and the United States, which benefitted the subsequent implementation of Plan Colombia.

General Tapias was a fundamental element in the search of international support that generated the feasibility of Plan Colombia which later became a vital back-up for the international fight against trafficking of illegal drugs. General Tapias served as CEO for Zehirut Group from 2011 to 2015, an organization that specializes in security services and consulting for governments, companies and institutions in Latin America and the Caribbean.

== Military career ==
Tapias joined the military school of cadets in 1961, in which he graduated as a sub lieutenant in 1963 in the branch of armed infantry. Throughout his military career, he endured his leadership in different commanding positions such as commander of the presidential battalion, commander of the fifth division, director of the arms and services school, director of the sub-officials military school, director of the military school of cadets, general inspector of the army, deputy commander and Chief of Staff of the Colombian Army.

Between 1998 and 2002, he served as General Commander of the Colombian Armed Forces. From this post, he planned and directed the reorganization of the Colombian military forces and generated the viability of Plan Colombia.

== Restructuring of the Colombian Armed forces ==
According to different sources like the newspaper El Colombiano and political magazine Semana, General Tapias is recognized as the man that started the modernization and professionalization of the Colombian Armed Forces, one of the main reasons he was awarded the French Legion of Honor, U.S. Legion of Merit and Colombian Boyaca Cross.

He was the commander of the Colombian Armed Forces in one of its most difficult moments ever: the ¨clearance zone¨ (demilitarized zone) in Caguan in 1998 during the peace negotiations between Andres Pastrana's government and the narco-guerrilla FARC. Tapias had to develop a strategic plan to restructure the armed forces to face the specific crisis and frictions the army had while at war in the middle of peace negotiations. Through this process, General Tapias led a vigorous internal purification in the armed forces that had the support of the other force commanders and the government. All this process contributed to improving substantially the affected relationships the country had had with the United States not too long earlier.

== Plan Colombia ==
During the presidential term of Andres Pastrana, the law 508 was passed on July 29, 1999, approving, according to the national constitution, the National Development Plan "A change to build peace 1999-2002" of which the Plan Colombia was a vital part. General Fernando Tapias, alongside President Andres Pastrana, were part of the representation committee that travelled to the United States in order to present the projection and development of the Plan Colombia to the members of the U.S. Congress.

The military exchange between Colombia and the United States was increased from that moment on, going from the exclusive cooperation that was given to the National Police to all the components of the Colombian Armed Forces. In December 1999, the U.S. Secretary of Defense, William Cohen and the Colombian Minister of Defense, Rodrigo LLoreda signed an agreement to increase the military cooperation between the two countries.

This agreement created a binational work team between the armed forces of both countries and started the specialization of "antinarcotics battalions" in the Colombian army under the direction of General Fernando Tapias. On January 11, 2000, U.S. President Bill Clinton announced the help granted for the Plan Colombia, which was later approved on July 13, 2000.

The plan has continued through temporary extensions under the administrations of Colombian presidents Alvaro Uribe and Juan Manuel Santos, and U.S. presidents George W. Bush and Barack Obama.

== Ambassador ==
General Tapias retired from the Colombian Armed Forces on August 7, 2000. After the election of president Alvaro Uribe. Tapias was appointed ambassador of Colombia in Dominican Republic. He served in this post from 2002 to 2004.

== Social and business group of the defense (deputy minister of defense) ==
After his diplomatic assignment, General Tapias was called by President Uribe to be appointed as Deputy Minister of Defense in order to create and organize the Social and Business Group of the Defense (SBGD). He was assigned the responsibility of strengthening the corporative policy of the business holding of the defense and strategically aligning the work of its 18 companies with the consolidation policies of the democratic security. This vice ministry was approved by the CONPES 3520 of June 9, 2008 in order to contribute to the efficient construction of peace and security for Colombia. This was done by providing the 400 thousand women and men of the armed forces with the timely supply of goods and services. The operational income of the group was then 4 billion pesos and it handled a portfolio of investments of 3.2 billion pesos. By 2009, the budget was 8.6 billion pesos.

Under the direction of General Tapias the SBGD (Social and business group of the defense) was in charge of the 33% of the total national budget of the Ministry of Defense. Due to its operational income, the SBGD was ranked number 10 among the top 100 biggest companies in Colombia and the second among the public ones. During his administration in this ministry, General Tapias developed a great deal of work which featured efficiency and transparency in the use of public resources, which was then 2.09% of the national Gross Domestic Product (GDP) in Colombia.

Having served the task assigned by the Ministry of Defense, General Tapias retired in 2010. He has become a lecturer for different national and international seminars on strategies to enhance security and defense and on restructuring the armed forces. At present, General Tapias is CEO for Zehirut Group where he dedicates to consulting and counseling business regarding security and defense issues.

== Awards ==
- The Legion of Merit, awarded by the United States government in 2002.
- Great Cross of Military Merit, awarded by the Government of Spain in 2007.
- The National Order of the Legion of Honor, awarded by the French Government in 2000.
- Gold Medal, awarded by the Government of Argentina.
- Minerva Medal, awarded by the Government of Chile.
- Star of the Armed Forces in Ecuador (Star of the military merit), awarded by the Government of Ecuador in 1992.
- Military Merit, awarded by the Government of Mexico in 2001.
- Military Order of the National Defense (Lord), awarded by the Government of Venezuela in 1995.
- The Boyaca Cross (great extraordinary golden cross), awarded by the Government of Colombia in 1999.
- The Boyacá Cross (Great officer), awarded by the government of Colombia 1n 1993.
- Order of Military Merit José María Córdova (great officer), awarded by the government of Colombia in 1993.
- Order of Military Merit Antonio Nariño (Great cross), awarded by the Colombian presidential office.
- Francisco Jose de Caldas Merit Medal (three times) awarded by the government of Colombia.
- Medal for Distinguished Services in Public Order. (twice)
- Ministry of Defense Medal (only category: distinguished service), awarded by the Colombian Ministry of Defense in 2000.
- Ministry of Defense Medal (great cross of distinguished service), awarded by the ministry of defense in 2002.
- Great Cross, awarded by the Chamber of Representatives of Colombia in 2001.
- Great Cross of the Air Force Merit, awarded by the Colombian Air Force in 1998.
- Admiral Padilla Navy Order (great officer), awarded by the Colombian Navy in 1998.
- Civic Star (great officer), awarded by the National Police Department.
- Medal to the University Merit (great cross) awarded by Nueva Granada military University in 2001.
- Great Golden Cross of the civic order in Cundinamarca "Antonio Nariño", awarded by the Governor's office in Cundinamarca, Colombia in 1996.
- Civic Star of the San Francisco Palace (commendation medal), awarded by the Governor's Office in Cundinamarca, Colombia 1996.
- Civic Merit Honor Decoration (special category) awarded by the Governor's office in Tolima, Colombia in 2000.
- City Order of Pitalito, awarded by Government of Pitalito, Huila in 2000.
- Honorary Award by the Press Forum Committee in 1999.
- Journalist Emeritus and Person of the year 1999.
- Management Spirit Award by the "Pedro Nel Ospina" Association of Business Managers in 2004.
- Partnership Honorary Award by the Colombian association of veteran officers from Korea, 2000.

== Post graduate education ==
- Honoris Causa degree in Business management, management school at Sergio Arboleda University.
- Psychological operations officer, Awarded by the Army Institute for Military Assistance.
- Honoris Causa Ph.D. In Business Management, Nueva Granada Military University.
- Diploma Course in the special program of public administration at the school of public administration.
- Diploma Course in geo-economic environments and government strategies at the international corporation for the educational development.
- Diploma course in Human rights, socio-geo policies and international humanitarian law at CIDE in 1998.
- Specialization course in sociology of the international relations, human rights and conflict resolution at CIDE in 1999.
- Specialization course in military intelligence at the "General Charry Solano" school of intelligence and counter-intelligence.
- Professional Course in Security Management and Sociopolitical analysis at the school of intelligence in 2000.
- Professional course in military science at Military School of Cadets.
- Specialization course in Environmental Management and Community Development at the School of Civic and Military Relation in 2004.
