= List of presidents of Kansas State University =

== KSU presidents ==
The following men have served as president of Kansas State University:

No.	Image	Name	Term start	Term end	Ref.
Kansas State Agricultural College (1863–1931)
1		Joseph Denison	September 1, 1863	August 31, 1873	
2		John Anderson	September 1, 1873	September 1, 1879	
3		George Fairchild	December 1, 1879	June 30, 1897	
4		Thomas Elmer Will	July 1, 1897	June 30, 1899	
5		Ernest Reuben Nichols	July 1, 1899	June 30, 1909	
6		Henry J. Waters	July 1, 1909	December 31, 1917	
7		William Jardine	March 1, 1918	February 28, 1925	
8		Francis D. Farrell	March 1, 1925	August 31, 1943	
Kansas State College of Agriculture and Applied Science (1931–1959)
9		Milton Eisenhower; BS 1924^{+}	September 1, 1943	June 30, 1950 (Note: Resigned to head Pennsylvania State College.)	
10		James A. McCain	July 1, 1950	June 30, 1975	
Kansas State University (1959–present)
11		Duane C. Acker	July 1, 1975	June 30, 1986 (Note: Resigned to take USDA position.)	
12		Jon Wefald	July 1, 1986	June 14, 2009	
13		Kirk Schulz	June 15, 2009	April 25, 2016 (Note: Resigned to head Washington State University.)	
interim		Richard Myers; BS 1967^{+}	April 26, 2016	November 19, 2016	
14		Richard Myers; BS 1967^{+}	November 20, 2016	February 13, 2022	
15		Richard Linton	February 14, 2022	present	

Table notes:

^{+}Kansas State alumnus
