= Order of Naval Merit Admiral Padilla =

Order of Naval Merit Admiral Padilla Orden del Mérito Naval "Almirante Padilla"

Awarded by Colombia
- Awarded for: Exceptional military service to Colombia
- Status: Currently constituted
- Grand Master: President of Colombia
- Grand Chancellor: Minister of National Defence
- Grades: Grand Cross, Grand Officer, Commander, Officer, Knight, Companion

Precedence
- Next (higher): Orden del Mérito Militar "José María Córdova"
- Next (lower): Cruz de la Fuerza Aérea al "Mérito Aeronáutico"
- Ribbon bar of a Knight of the Order

The Order of Naval Merit Admiral Padilla (Spanish: Orden del Mérito Naval "Almirante Padilla") is an order granted by Colombia, established by Decree 2409 of 8 July 1947. The order is awarded to Colombian Navy personnel to recognize acts of valor, heroic actions, outstanding and distinguished professional service, and exemplary discipline and fellowship of personnel.

== Grades ==
The Order of Naval Merit Admiral Padilla is awarded in the following grades:

- Grand Cross (Gran Cruz)
- Grand Officer (Gran Oficial)
- Commander (Comendador)
- Officer (Oficial)
- Gentleman (Caballero)
- Companion (Compañero)

Ribbon bars of the Order of Naval Merit Admiral Padilla
Grand Cross	Grand Officer	Commander
Officer	Gentleman	Companion

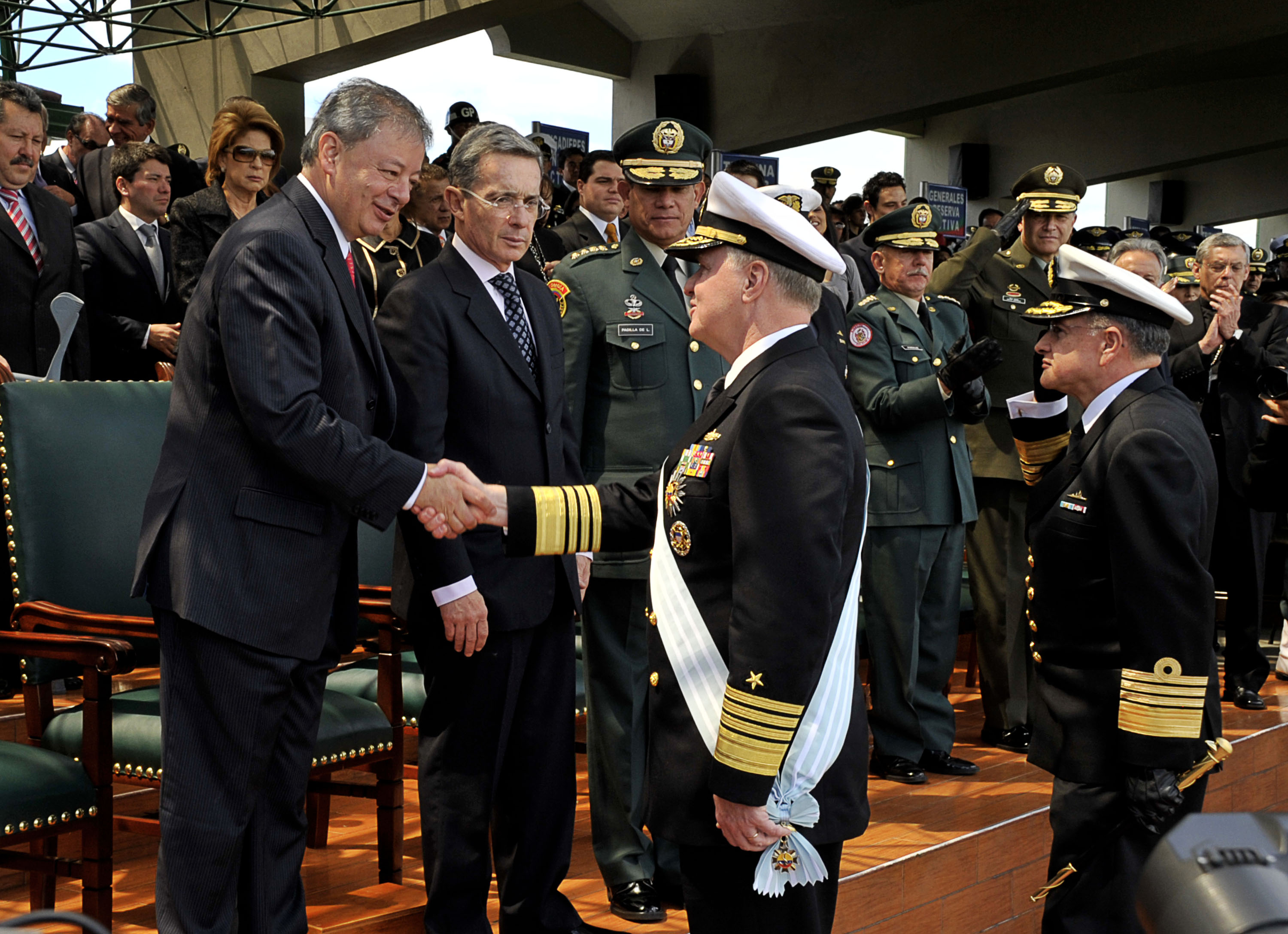
Adm. Gary Roughead wearing the sash of the Order

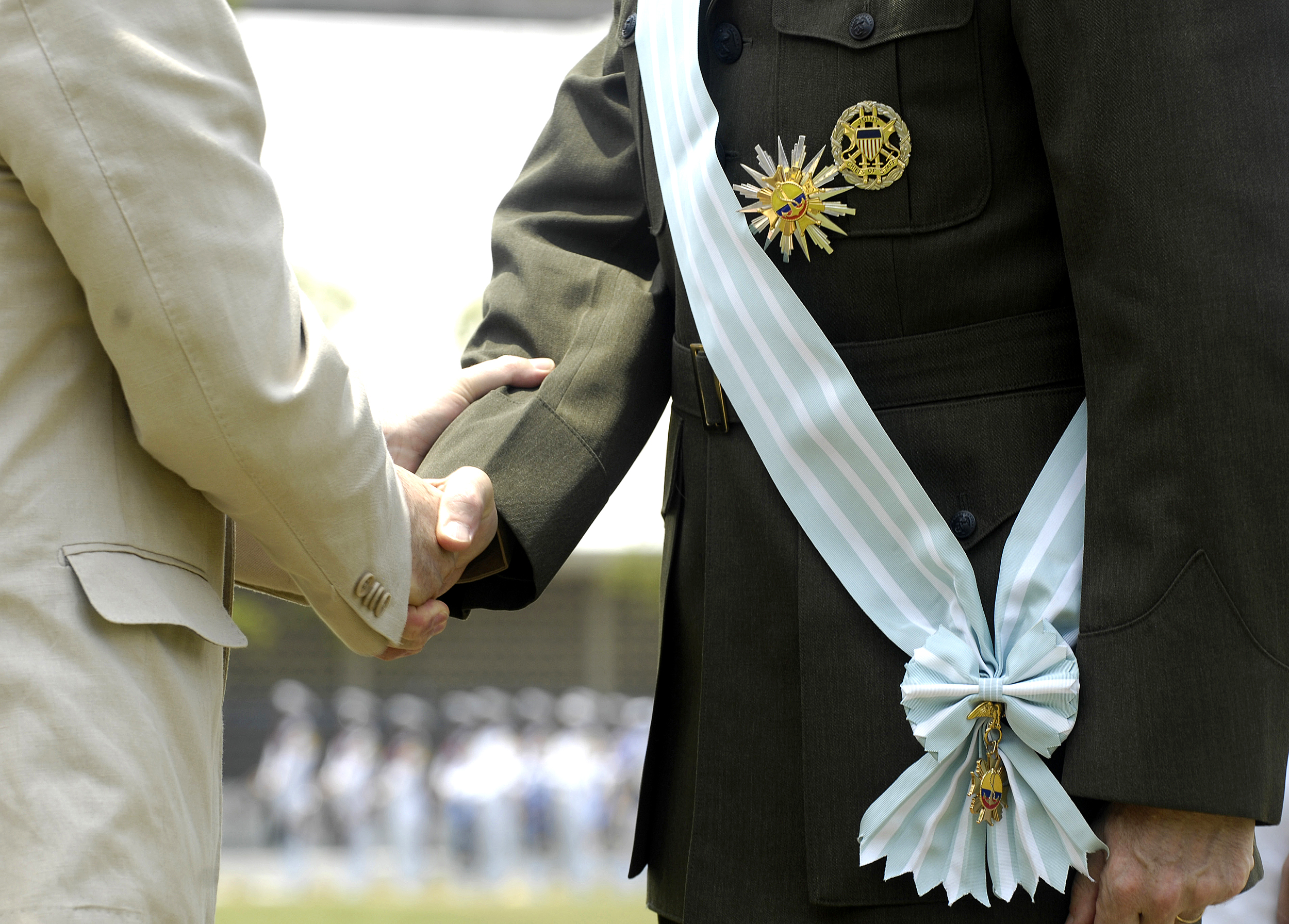
Sash of the Order, worn by General Peter Pace

== Recipients ==
- Peter Pace
- Robert J. Papp Jr.
- Gary Roughead
- Chandrika Prasad Srivastava
- James G. Stavridis
- Fernando Tapias Stahelin
- Elmo Zumwalt
