= Medal for Service in War Overseas =

Medal for Service in War Overseas Medalla por servicios en "Guerra Internacional"
- Ribbon of the medal
- Type: Military decoration
- Awarded for: Bravery or distinguished service.
- Presented by: Colombia
- Eligibility: Members of the Military Forces of Colombia.
- Campaign: Korean War
- Status: No longer awarded
- Established: 1952

Precedence
- Next (higher): Order of San Carlos
- Next (lower): Orden del Mérito Militar "Antonio Nariño"

The Medal for Service in War Overseas (Spanish: Medalla por servicios en "Guerra Internacional") is a military decoration awarded by Colombia. Established in 1952, the medal was awarded in two classes to members of the Military Forces of Colombia who distinguished themselves in action during the Korean War.

== Background ==
The Medal for Service in War Overseas was established by Decree No. 812 of 1952. The medal is for award to members of the Armed Forces who serve in international conflicts overseas. The medal is awarded in two classes, an Iron Cross (Cruz de Hierro) and a Bronze Star (Estrella de Bronce). The Iron Cross was awarded to those members of the armed forces who distinguished themselves by meritorious devotion to duty during combat operations. The Iron Cross could also be awarded with a laurel device for distinguished valor. The Bronze Star was conferred by decree of the National Government to those members of the Armed Forces who served in international war. The medal is awarded by recommendation of the respective theater commander to the General Command of the Armed Forces. The theater commander provides the necessary documentation showing recipients have met the requirements for the medal. The Medal for Service in War Overseas has only been authorized for issue during the Korean War.

== Appearance ==
The Iron Cross is a 44 millimetres (2 in) wide blackened iron cross pattée with a beaded edge. In the center of the obverse is the coat of arms of Colombia. On the reverse, in the center, is a taeguk with four trigrams and an inscription. Inscribed on the left arm is ACCION DISTINGUIDA DE VALOR and the right arm CAMPANA DE COREA (Korean Campaign).

The Bronze Star is a faceted five-pointed star in bronze. On the obverse, in the center, is the coat of arms of Colombia surrounded by a wreath. On the reverse in the center is the inscription CAMPANA DE COREA above a taeguk and trigrams.

The medals hang from a ring suspension on an identical distinctive ribbon. The ribbon is white and is edged in yellow, blue and red, the colors of the Flag of Colombia. In the center of the ribbon is a red and blue taeguk and four black trigrams. Additional awards are indicated by a bronze oak leaf attachment on the ribbon.
