= Colombian military decorations =

Colombian military decorations date back as far as the founding of the country. An early decoration was the Cruz de Boyacá that was awarded to the generals who led their forces to victory in the Battle of Boyacá in 1819. This early decoration lives on today as an incarnation of the highest order presented by the Colombian state. There is one decoration higher, but it is only awarded for military conflicts in defence of Colombia. Other than military decorations, Colombia presents decorations on behalf of the National Government, decorations for the National Police, and decorations from the Congress of Colombia.

== Military Order of St. Matthew (Orden Militar de San Mateo) ==
Colombia's highest award, named for the Battle of San Mateo estate during the South American wars of independence, and particularly honoring the sacrifice of Captain Antonio Ricaurte, who sacrificed himself during the battle. The order recognizes military personnel for acts of exceptional valor in time of war (specifically a war to defend Colombia; it is not authorized for civil war, internal disturbance, or international conflict). The decoration is a dark blue Maltese cross w/ball tips, rimmed gold, silver, or iron according to class and resting on a green-enameled laurel wreath; the round purple center medallion bears the bust of Capt. Antonio Ricaurte surrounded by a band inscribed "Ricaurte" above & "1814 - 1914" below. The reverse of the medallion is white, rimmed gold, silver, or iron according to class, inscribed "Colombia - Orden Militar de San Mateo - 1ra (or 2do or 3ca) clase." The cross is suspended by a ring from a ribbon that is half yellow (left) & half equal stripes of blue & red, with an open gold, silver, or iron frame at the top of ribbon. Comes in 3 classes: 1st class -dark blue cross with bright gold rim, finials, & bust; 2nd class -dark blue cross with polished silver rim, finials, & bust; 3rd class -polished iron cross without enamel. The Order was created by Public Law number 40 of 1913 and modified by Decree number 349 of 1914.

== Order of Boyaca (Orden de Boyacá) ==
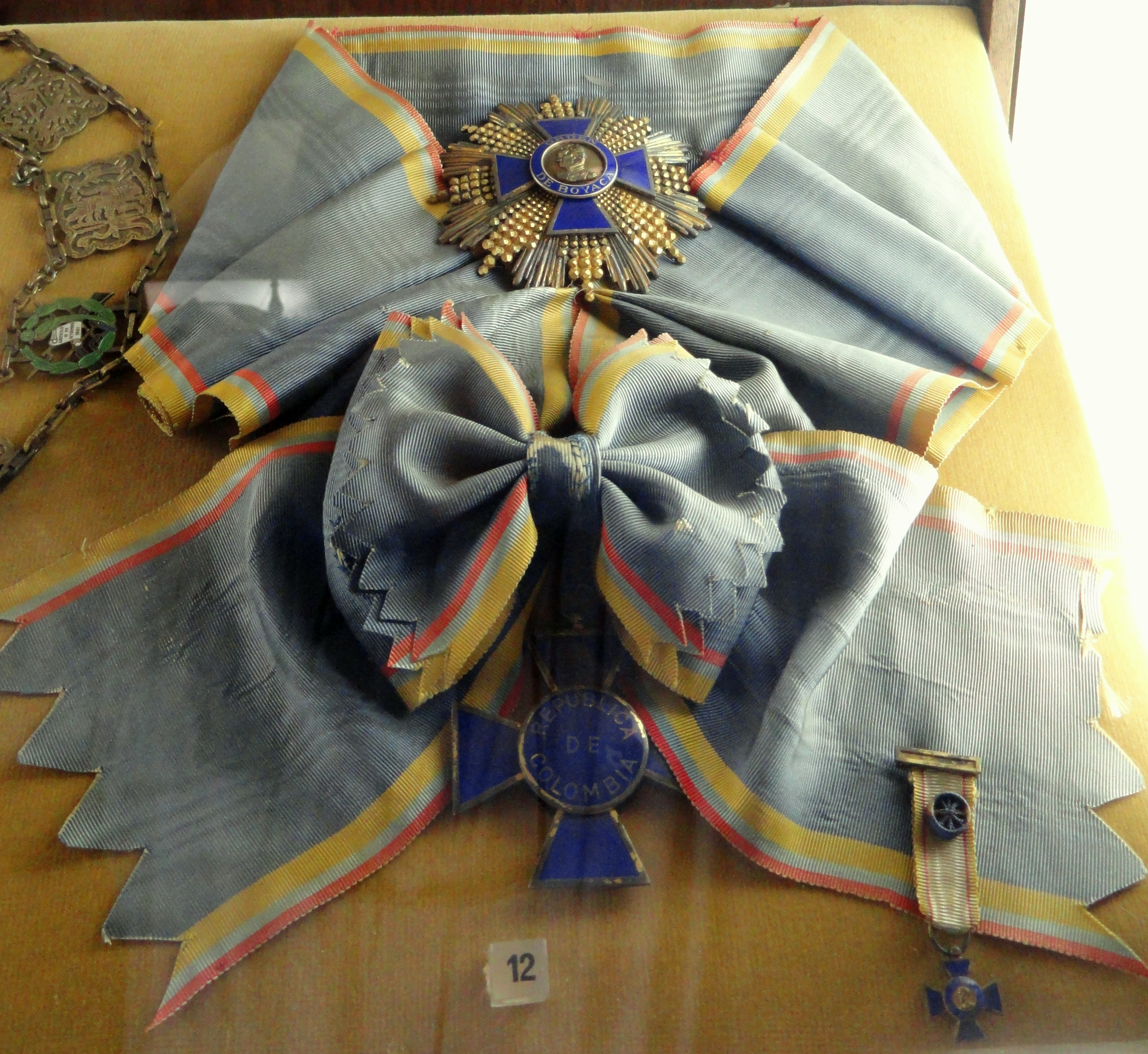
Grand Cross of the Order of Boyacá, awarded to Juscelino Kubitschek

The Order of Boyaca is awarded for exceptional services to the armed forces of Colombia, as well as to extraordinary citizens who have not served in the military forces, and is often given in recognition of 50 years military service. The badge of the order is a gold rimmed, dark blue enameled cross pattée with a large gold medallion bearing the profile of Simon Bolivar, surrounded by a blue band inscribed, "Orden de Boyaca" in gold. The star of the order has an enameled copy of the cross on a silver 8-pointed star of multiple rays, with additional "pencils" of rays between the points. The badge is suspended from a blue ribbon with narrow yellow-blue-red edges. Presented in six classes: Gran Cruz Extraordianaria (reserved for Heads of State and President-elects), Gran Cruz, Gran Official, Comendador, Official, Caballero, and Compañero.

Ribbon bars of the Order of Boyaca"
Knight	Officer	Commander	Silver Cross	Grand Cross

== Antonio Nariño Military Order of Merit (Orden del Mérito Militar "Antonio Nariño") ==
Awarded for acts of courage or outstanding service in time of war or while maintaining public order. The badge is a cross pattée of eight points, with a large central medallion embossed with the profile Antonio Narino; a pair of crossed swords appear between the arms of the cross, resting on multiple rays between the angles. The breast star has a gold or silver copy of the badge on an 8-pointed star of multiple rays. The ribbon is yellow with medium width yellow-narrow blue-narrow red border stripes.

== José María Córdova Order of Military Merit (Orden del Mérito Militar "José María Córdova") ==
Awarded for acts of valor or outstanding service. Badge is a black-enameled cross pattée having a red outward-pointing triangle in each arm, with a large central medallion bearing the profile of Jose Maria Córdova; cross rests within a hollow circle inscribed with the name of the order. The breast star has the badge of the order on a star of eight rays with distinctive spaces appearing between each bundle of rays. The ribbon is red with medium width yellow-narrow blue-narrow red -very narrow yellow edges. It has been presented to non-citizens, for example the Canadian Major General Meating, with whom Colombian troops served on a UN mission.

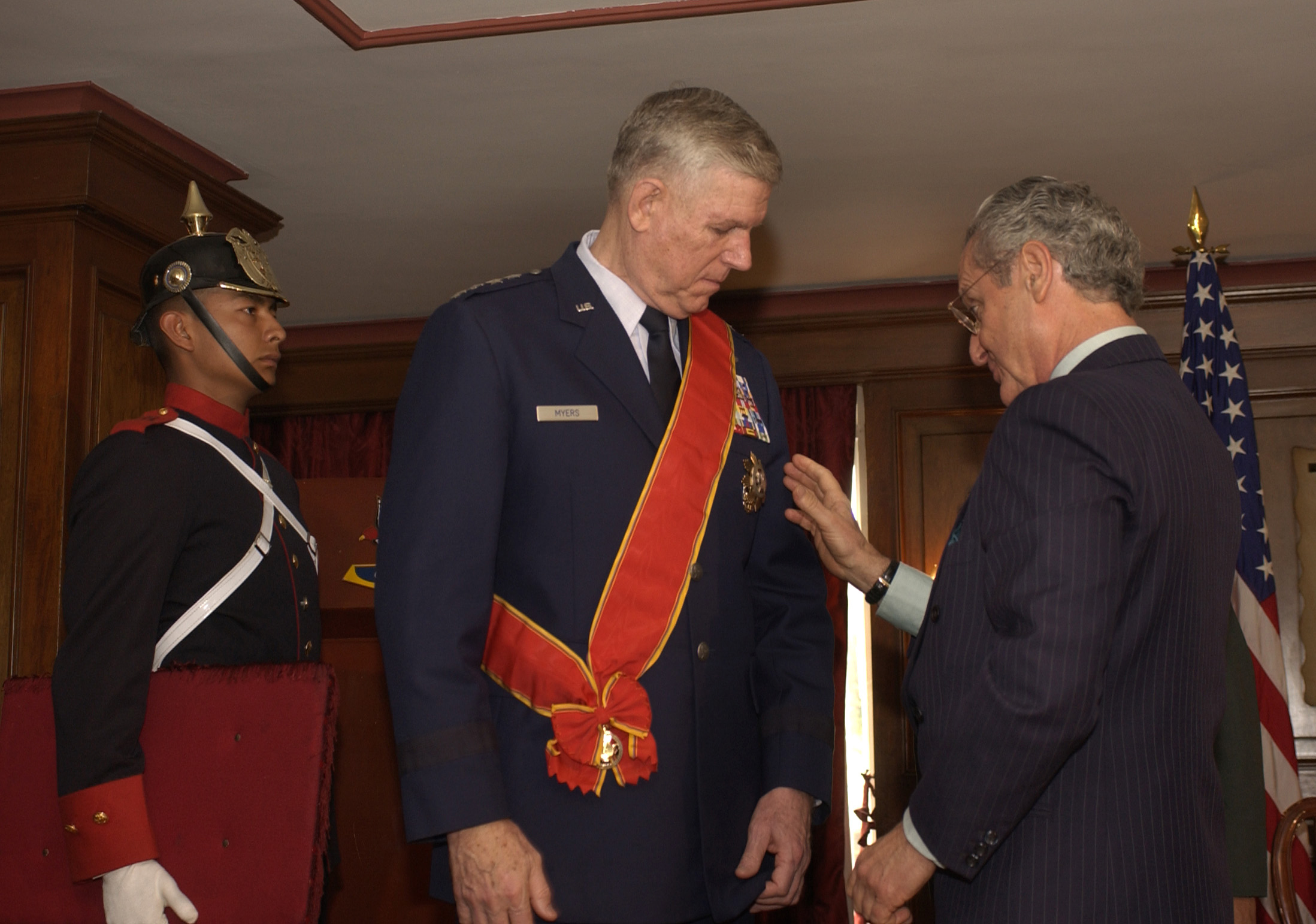
Gen. Richard Meyers wearing the award

== Admiral Jose Prudencio Padilla Order of Naval Merit (Orden del Mérito Naval "Almirante Padilla") ==
Awarded to naval personnel for acts of courage or outstanding service to maritime science or naval development. The badge is a silver cross pattée with raised rim & slightly concave terminations, with a large oak leaf in the angles between each arm; the very large central medallion bears a silver fouled anchor on horizontal yellow-blue-red stripes, enclosed within a ring. The breast star has the badge of the order on a star of 16 rays (major rays are square bundles of three, while the minor rays each consist of a single sharp ray) with distinctive spaces appearing between each bundle of rays. The badge is suspended by a spread-wing condor from an aquamarine ribbon with three equally-spaced medium width white stripes.

Ribbon bars of the Order of Naval Merit "Admiral Padilla"
Companion	Knight	Officer	Commander	Grand Officer	Grand Cross

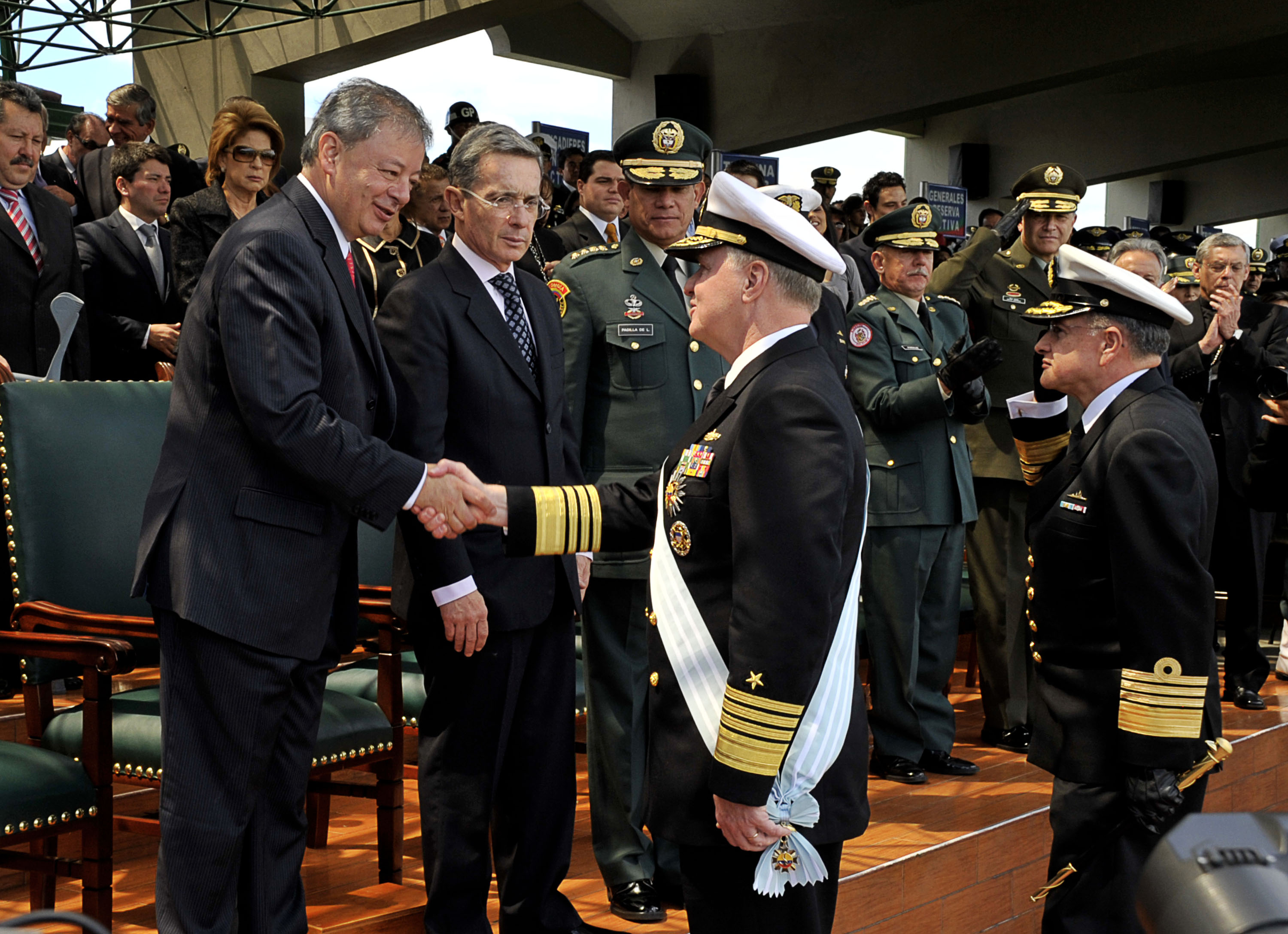
Adm. Gary Roughead wearing the sash of the Order

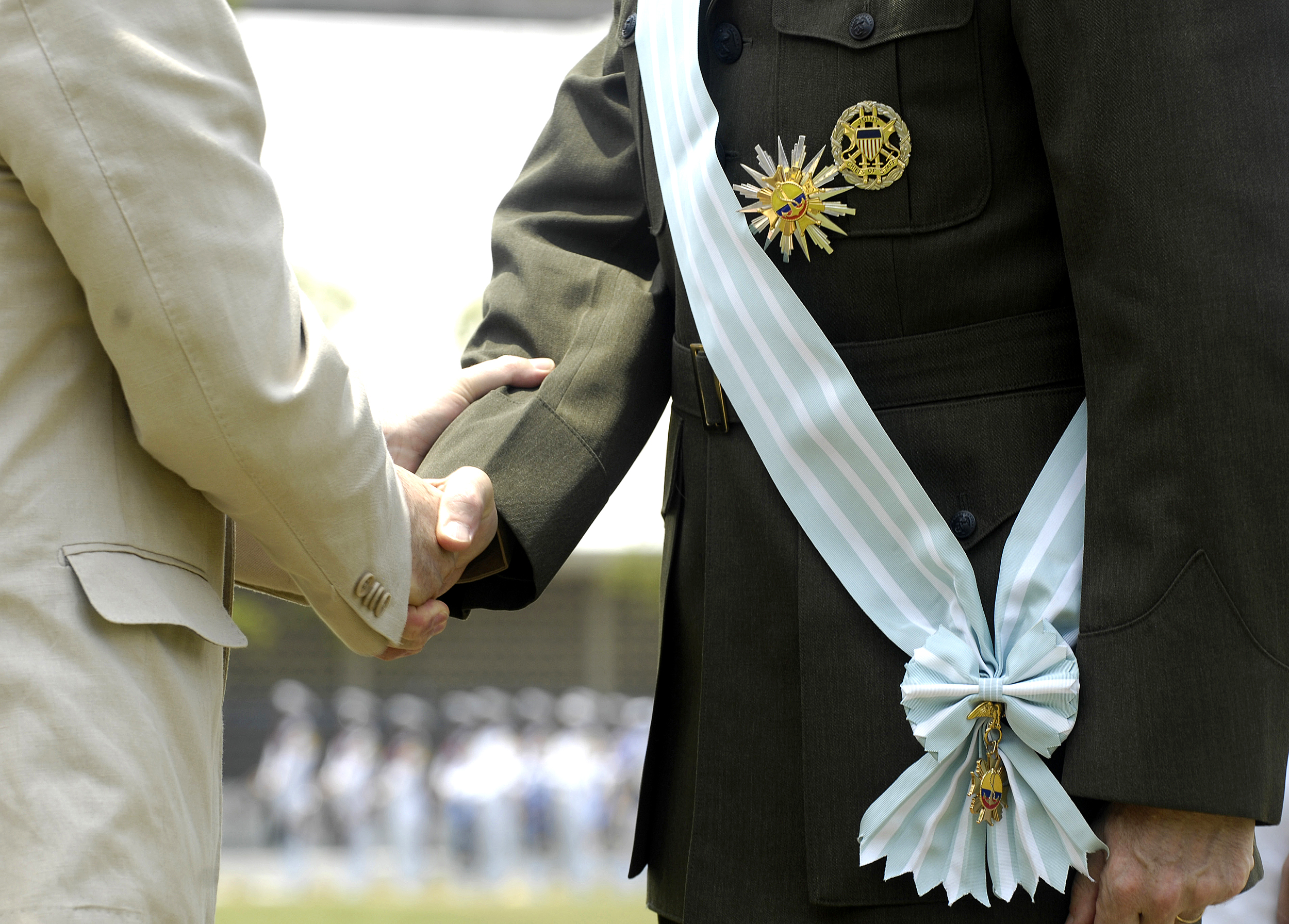
Sash of the Order

== Cross of Aviation Merit of the Colombian Aerospace Force (Cruz de la Fuerza Aeroespacial al Mérito Aeronáutico) ==
Awarded to Aerospace Force personnel for acts of courage or for outstanding service to the Colombian Aerospace Force. The cross is a silver trefle cross with eagle claws adorning the terminations, and with two Prussian blue stripes along the vertical arms; the round central medallion bears the Aerospace Force crest within a circlet of laurel. The silver or gold 8-point breast star of multiple rays bears a copy of the badge in its center. The badge is suspended by a flying condor from a sky blue ribbon with narrow yellow-blue-red edges.

== Police Star Order (Orden Estrella de la Policia) ==
Awarded to sworn personnel of the National Police of Colombia for acts of courage or for outstanding service to the community, the National Police and the nation.

== José Fernández Madrid Order of Medical Merit (Orden del Mérito Sanitario "José Fernández Madrid") ==
Awarded to military medical personnel for acts of courage or outstanding service to science or military medicine. The badge is a dark green enameled cross pattée surrounded by an open wreath, with a large round central medallion bearing the profile of Jose Fernandez Madrid. The breast star has a copy of the badge of the order on a star of eight rays, with distinctive spaces appearing between each bundle of rays. The ribbon is white, with medium width yellow-narrow blue-narrow red edges.

== Medal for Service in War Overseas (Medalla por Servicios en Guerra Internacional) ==
The Medal for Service in War Overseas was created in 1952 by Decree number 812, and awarded in 2 categories to military personnel for acts of bravery or meritorious acts during war or international conflict overseas, this consists of either a darkened iron Padua cross with inset, beaded rim (resembles the German Iron Cross) or a faceted bronze 5-point star (looks like the US Bronze Star). Each is embossed with the Colombian coat of arms in the center, within a circular laurel wreath for the Bronze Star; the reverse bears an appropriate campaign symbol and the name of the operation or conflict (e.g. Korean taeguk & "Campaña de Corea"), with addition of "Acción Distinguida de Valor" for the Iron Cross. The medals are suspended by a ring from a distinctive ribbon. To date, the medal has only been authorized for the Korean War: the ribbon is white, with a red & blue Korean taeguk & black trigram symbols from the South Korean flag, and very narrow yellow-blue-red edges and hollow bronze mounting frame at top. Additional awards are indicated by a bronze oak leaf mounted to the ribbon. Category 1 for distinguished valor; iron cross (Cruz de Hierro); Category 2 for merit or devotion to duty in action; bronze star (Estrella de Bronce).

== Medal for Distinguished Service in Preserving Public Order (Medalla Servicios Distinguidos en "Orden Público") ==
Also created in 1952, by Decree number 803. However, this medal is awarded to military personnel for acts of courage or distinguished merit during civil disturbances within Colombia. The medal is a gray steel cross pattée with raised rim & stippled arms, having a large central medallion embossed with the national coat of arms; rays appear between the arms of the cross, with crossed saber & rifle appearing between the arms of the cross & resting on the rays. The cross is suspended by a ring from a lead-gray ribbon with medium width yellow-narrow blue-narrow red edges; small 5-point stars or 16-point suns on the ribbon & ribbon bar indicate additional awards. 2nd Award -bronze star; 3rd Award -bronze & silver stars; 4th Award -bronze, silver, & gold stars; 5th Award -bronze, silver, & 2 gold stars; 6th Award -bronze, silver, & 3 gold stars; 7th Award -gold sun on a circlet of laurel; 8th Award -2 gold suns on laurel circlets; 9th Award -3 gold suns on laurel circlets; 10th Award -4 gold suns on laurel circlets.

== Military Medal of Valor (Medalla Militar al Valor) ==
Awarded for acts of valor or daring in action during time of peace or civil disturbance. The medal is a rounded gray steel disk with small rectangles cut out at the quadrants (resembles a rounded cross formée), with the arms of the "cross" highlighted by raised rays at each edge and having a round central medallion bearing the Army, Navy or Aerospace Force coat of arms within a circle. The medal is suspended by a ring from a dark green ribbon with red center stripe. The service ribbon has the Army, Navy, or Aerospace Force emblem in center; small bronze, silver, or gold stars on the ribbon indicate additional awards. The decoration was created by Government Decree number 2281, dated 10 November 1998.

== Medal for Those Wounded in Action (Medalla Militar "Herido en Acción") ==
Presented to those who sustain wounds in combat or as a result of enemy action. The medal is a silvered 16-point sunburst with small 5-point stars between the angles of the points, with a raised disk in the center embossed with the coat-of-arms of the appropriate military service (Army, Navy, or Aerospace Force) below the inscription, "Herido en Acción." Reverse of the disk reads, "Medalla Militar - Herido en Acción" in a circle. The medal is suspended from a bar at the bottom of a royal blue ribbon with medium width yellow-narrow blue-narrow red edges; the number of awards are indicated by small 5-point stars on the ribbon or service badge. 1st Award -bronze star; 2nd Award -bronze & silver stars; 3rd Award -bronze, silver, & gold stars; 4th Award -bronze, silver, & 2 gold stars; 5th Award -bronze, silver, & 3 gold stars. Note: the service badge consists of a horizontal blue enameled oval, bordered by a gold wreath, with small 5-point stars in the center according to number of awards

== Medal for Military Service (Medalla por Tiempo de Servicio) ==
Awarded for honorable military service of more than fifteen years, the decoration consists of a silver eight-pointed star of multiple rays, each ray tipped with a small silver ball. In the center of the medal is the national coat of arms surrounded by an inscribed blue enamel band. The medal is suspended from a yellow ribbon with wide blue borders; additional narrow blue stripes in the center of the yellow stripe indicate higher awards. 40 years -badge on a sash with 5 narrow blue stripes; 35 years -badge on a neck ribbon with 4 narrow blue stripes; 30 years -badge on a neck ribbon with 3 narrow blue stripes; 25 years -badge on a chest ribbon with 2 narrow blue stripes; 20 years -badge on a chest ribbon with 1 narrow blue stripe; 15 years -badge on a chest ribbon.

== Armed Forces Medal "For Faith in the Cause" (Medalla “Fe en la Causa") ==
The Armed Forces Medal is a medal awarded by the Military Forces for service in the missions entrusted to the NFC by the Constitution. Alongside a joint-services division of the medal, divisions also exist to honor those who are service personnel of the service branch belonged upon receipt of the medal.

== Order of precedence ==
Promulgated in Decree 4949 of 2007, the following is the order of precedence of Colombian military decorations:

1. Orden Militar de San Mateo
2. Orden de Boyacá
3. Orden de San Carlos
4. Medalla Servicios en Guerra Internacional
5. Orden del Mérito Militar Antonio Nariño
6. Orden del Mérito Militar José María Córdova
7. Orden del Mérito Naval Almirante Padilla
8. Cruz de la Fuerza Aeroespacial al Mérito Aeronáutico
9. Orden del Mérito Sanitario José Fernández Madrid
10. Orden Estrella de la Policía
11. Orden Militar 13 de junio
12. Medalla Servicios Distinguidos en "Orden Público"
13. Orden Cruz al Merito Policial
14. Orden al Merito "Coronel Guillermo Fergusson"
15. Medalla Militar "Al Valor"
16. Medalla Militar "Herido en Acción"
17. Medalla Militar "Francisco José de Caldas"
18. Medalla por Tiempo de Servicio (40;35;30;25;20;15)
19. Medalla Militar "Campaña del Sur"
20. Medalla Militar "Soldado Juan Bautista Solarte Obando"
21. Medalla Militar Ministerio de Defensa Nacional
22. Medalla Militar Servicios Distinguidos al Comando General de las Fuerzas Militares
23. Medalla Servicios Distinguidos a la Armada Nacional
24. Medalla "Marco Fidel Suárez"
25. Medalla "Batalla de Ayacucho"
26. Medalla "San Jorge"
27. Medalla "Santa Bárbara"
28. Medalla "Torre de Castilla"
29. Medalla "San Gabriel"
30. Medalla al Mérito Logístico y Administrativo "General Francisco de Paula Santander"
31. Medalla "Brigadier General Ricardo Charry Solano"
32. Medalla Militar "Alas Doradas"
33. Medalla Servicios distinguidos a la "Fuerza de Superficie"
34. Medalla Servicios distinguidos a la "Infantería de Marina"
35. Medalla Servicios distinguidos a la "Fuerza Submarina"
36. Medalla Servicios distinguidos a la "Aviación Naval"
37. Medalla Servicios Distinguidos al "Cuerpo de Guardacostas"
38. Medalla Servicios Distinguidos a la "Inteligencia Naval"
39. Medalla de Servicios Distinguidos a la "Ingeniería Naval"
40. Medalla al Mérito Logístico y Administrativo "Contralmirante Rafael Tono"
41. Medalla "Servicios distinguidos a la Dirección General Marítima"
42. Medalla "Águila de Gules"
43. Medalla Servicios Distinguidos a la "Seguridad y Defensa de Bases Aeroespacial"
44. Medalla Servicios Distinguidos al "Cuerpo Logístico"
45. Medalla Militar "Servicios Distinguidos a la Justicia Penal Militar"
46. Medalla "Orden Por La Libertad Personal"
47. Medalla Militar "Escuela Superior de Guerra"
48. Medalla Militar "Al Mérito de la Reserva"
49. Medalla Militar "General José Hilario López Valdés"
50. Medalla Militar "Escuela Militar de Cadetes"
51. Medalla Militar "Centenario Escuela Militar De Cadetes General Jose María Córdova"
52. Medalla Servicios Distinguidos a la "Escuela Naval de Cadetes Almirante Padilla"
53. Medalla Militar "Servicios Meritorios Inteligencia Militar "Guardián de la Patria"
54. Medalla Militar "Escuela de Suboficiales del Ejército "Sargento Inocencio Chinca"
55. Medalla Servicios Distinguidos a la "Escuela Naval de Suboficiales"
56. Medalla Servicios Distinguidos a la Escuela de Formación de Infantería de Marina
57. Medalla "Escuela de Lanceros"
58. Medalla Militar "Escuela de Armas y Servicios José Celestino Mutis Bossio"
59. Medalla Militar Escuela de Soldados Profesionales "Teniente General Gustavo Rojas Pinilla"
60. Medalla Militar "Honor al Deber Cumplido"
61. Medalla "Guardia Presidencial"
62. Medalla Policía Militar "General Tomás Cipriano de Mosquera
63. Medalla "Cadete José María Rosillo"
64. Medalla "Alumno Distinguido"
