= Richard Linton (educator) =

American academic (born 1966)

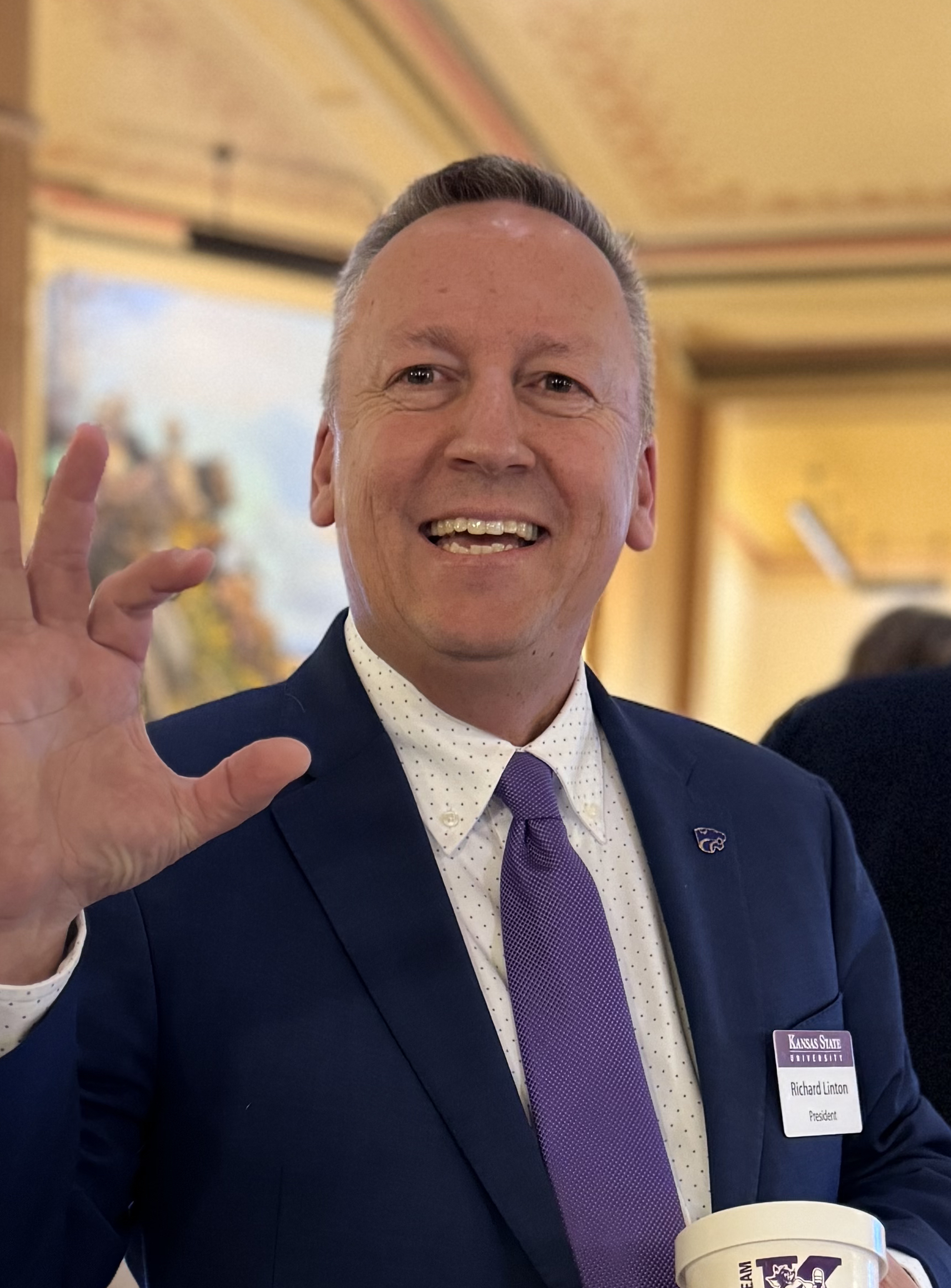
- Linton in 2024

17th President of Virginia Tech
- Assuming office January 19, 2027
- Succeeding: Tim Sands

15th President of Kansas State University
- In office February 14, 2022 – October 14, 2026
- Preceded by: Richard Myers

Personal details
- Born: Richard Howard Linton; March 18, 1966 (age 60) New Jersey, U.S.
- Spouse: Sally Jane Peart (m. 2000)
- Education: Virginia Tech (BA, MA, PhD)
- Website: President Richard Linton

Richard Howard Linton (born March 18, 1966) is an American academic. He was the 15th president of Kansas State University and will be the 17th president of Virginia Tech.

== Biography ==
Linton was born in New Jersey to Howard Richard Linton and Doris Helen Linton (nee Tuckwood). His father earned a Ph.D. in chemistry from the University of Pennsylvania and worked at DuPont for 35 years, where he developed several patents. Linton holds a Bachelor's in Biology (1988), a Master's in Food Science (1991), as well as a Ph.D. in Food Science (1994), all from Virginia Tech

== Career ==
Linton was a professor of food science at Purdue University (1994–2011). From 2011 to 2012, he was the department chair of food science and technology at Ohio State University. In 2012, he became dean of the College of Agriculture and Life Science at North Carolina State University, a position he held for 10 years. The Kansas Board of Regents selected Linton to be the 15th president of Kansas State University on December 2, 2021.

In addition to his role at Kansas State University, Linton serves as a member of the Food and Drug Administration's Science Advisory Board. He also serves as the chair for the Binational (Israel and United States) Agricultural Research and Development Fund, a role to which he was appointed in 2018 by the U.S. Secretary of Agriculture, Sonny Perdue.

=== North Carolina State University ===
On September 15, 2012, Linton began his service as Dean of the College of Agriculture at North Carolina State University.

Linton spearheaded the development and execution of the College of Agriculture and Life Sciences (CALS) Strategic Plan, titled 2020 Vision: People, Programs, and Partnerships. He assembled a forward-thinking strategic planning team and facilitated 27 public listening sessions across North Carolina, engaging more than 5,000 stakeholders to gather input on the state's needs and aspirations. The resulting plan centered on five strategic initiatives designed to promote interdisciplinary collaboration, advance diversity and inclusion, strengthen public and private partnerships, and support the growth of North Carolina's agricultural economy.

As Dean of the College of Agriculture and Life Sciences (CALS) at North Carolina State University, Rich Linton played a key leadership role in launching the North Carolina Plant Sciences Initiative (N.C. PSI), a statewide effort to position North Carolina as a global leader in agricultural innovation. Informed by a 2013 statewide agricultural tour where Linton engaged directly with farmers and stakeholders, the initiative was designed to address major challenges in agriculture, including climate change, crop disease, loss of farmland, and global food security.

Under Linton's leadership, NC State secured significant public and private support for the project. In 2015, the state approved $85 million in bond funding, and the Golden LEAF Foundation contributed $48 million—its largest-ever gift to NC State. An additional $6 million was raised by 44 commodity groups. Key partners in the initiative included the U.S. Department of Agriculture and the North Carolina Department of Agriculture and Consumer Services.

Construction of the Plant Sciences Building began in April 2019, and a ceremonial groundbreaking was held on September 6, 2019, with over 400 supporters in attendance. The building was completed on time and on budget and is considered one of the most advanced agricultural research facilities in the world. It was designed to support interdisciplinary collaboration among scientists, government agencies, and industry leaders to develop resilient crops, boost yields, extend growing seasons, and foster economic development in rural communities.

Linton described the initiative as a model of collaboration and a direct response to the needs of North Carolina's agricultural community.

=== Kansas State University ===
On February 14, 2022, Linton became the President of Kansas State University. The priorities of his term include driving statewide economic growth, strengthening university-industry partnerships, and revitalizing the university's facilities and enrolment. One of his most ambitious targets, inspired by a challenge from the Kansas Board of Regents, was to help create 3,000 new jobs and generate a $3 billion economic impact for Kansas by 2030.

In August 2023, Linton announced to the university community that he had been diagnosed with throat and tongue cancer. He subsequently received daily treatments from the University of Kansas Cancer Center. During his absence, Marshall Stewart, senior vice president and chief of staff, stood in for him in the university's decision-making activities and represented him at university events. On October 13, 2023, Linton's cancer treatments were completed and he returned to his campus residence, saying, "I am planning to conduct much of my work from the Pres Res as I regain my strength."

Despite his health challenges, President Linton launched a strategic plan, titled "Next-Gen K-State", plan focused on expanding access, growing research, and deepening the University's impact across Kansas. In 2024, Kansas State University surpassed 20,000 in total enrolment and welcomed its largest freshman class in nine years, which Linton celebrated in his 2024 address to the community.

From July 2024 through June 2025, Linton was the sixth highest paid employee of the state of Kansas, with a reported salary of $713,000.

=== Virginia Tech ===
On October 14, 2026, Linton was appointed President of Virginia Tech. He will begin his term at Virginia Tech at the beginning of the 2027 spring semester.
