= Order of Military Merit José María Córdova =

Order of Military Merit José María Córdova Orden del Mérito Militar "José María Córdova"

Awarded by Colombia
- Awarded for: Exceptional military service to Colombia
- Status: Currently constituted
- Grand Master: President of Colombia
- Grand Chancellor: Minister of National Defence
- Grades: Grand Cross, Grand Officer, Commander, Officer, Knight, Companion

Precedence
- Next (higher): Orden del Mérito Militar "Antonio Nariño"
- Next (lower): Orden del Mérito Naval "Almirante Padilla"
- Ribbon bar of a Knight of the Order

The Order of Military Merit José María Córdova (Spanish: Orden del Mérito Militar "José María Córdova") is an order granted by Colombia. Established by Decree 3950 of 28 December 1950, the order is awarded to members of the Army of Colombia who have excelled in discipline and military virtue, provided eminent services and fellowship, or for acts of courage.

== Grades ==
The Order of Military Merit José María Córdova is awarded in the following grades:

- Grand Cross (Gran Cruz)
- Grand Officer (Gran Oficial)
- Commander (Comendador)
- Officer (Oficial)
- Knight (Caballero)
- Companion (Compañero)

Ribbon bars of the Order of Military Merit José María Córdova
Grand Cross	Grand Officer	Commander
Officer	Knight	Companion

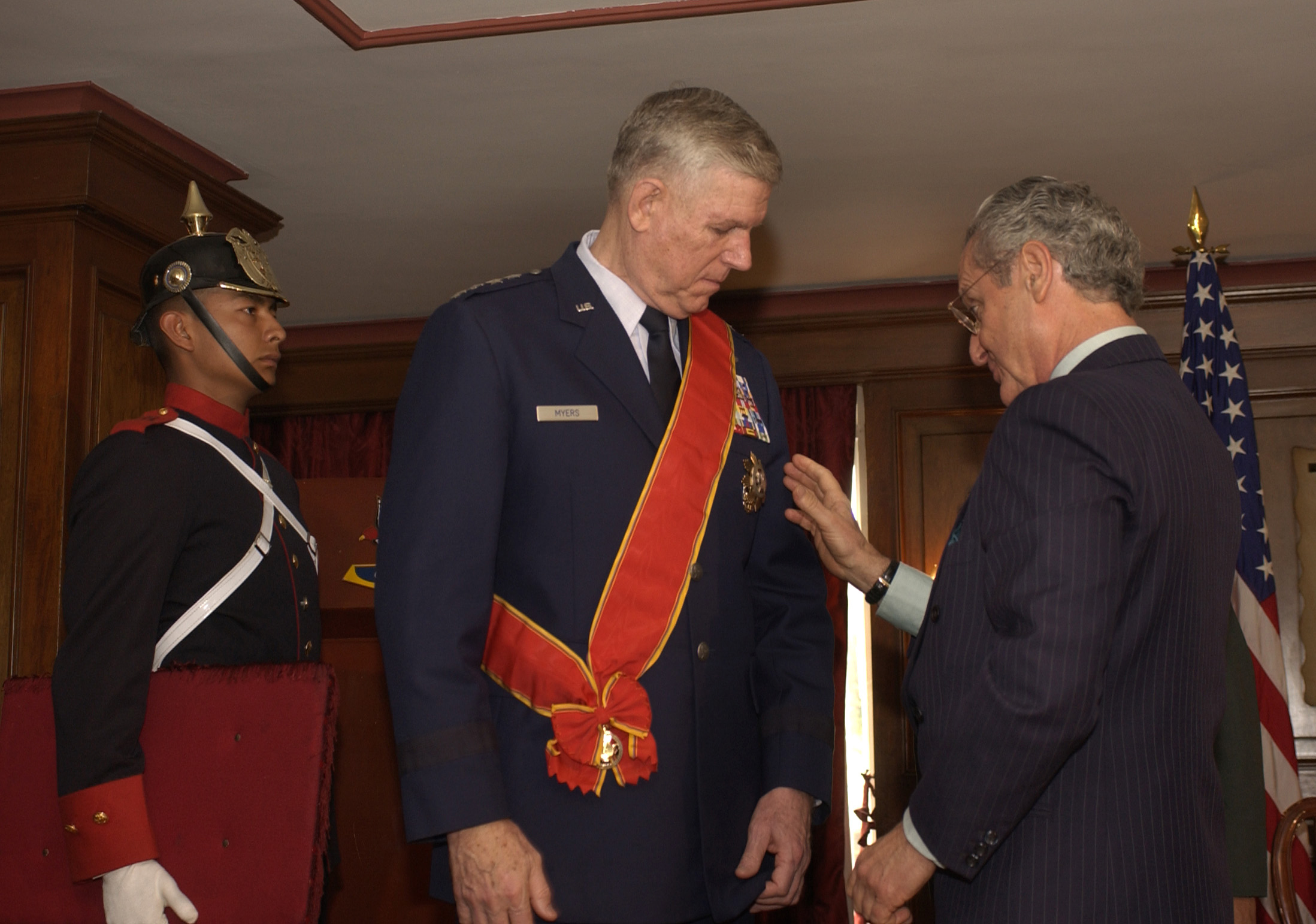
Gen. Richard Myers wearing the award
