= Richard Myers =

American Air Force general (born 1942)

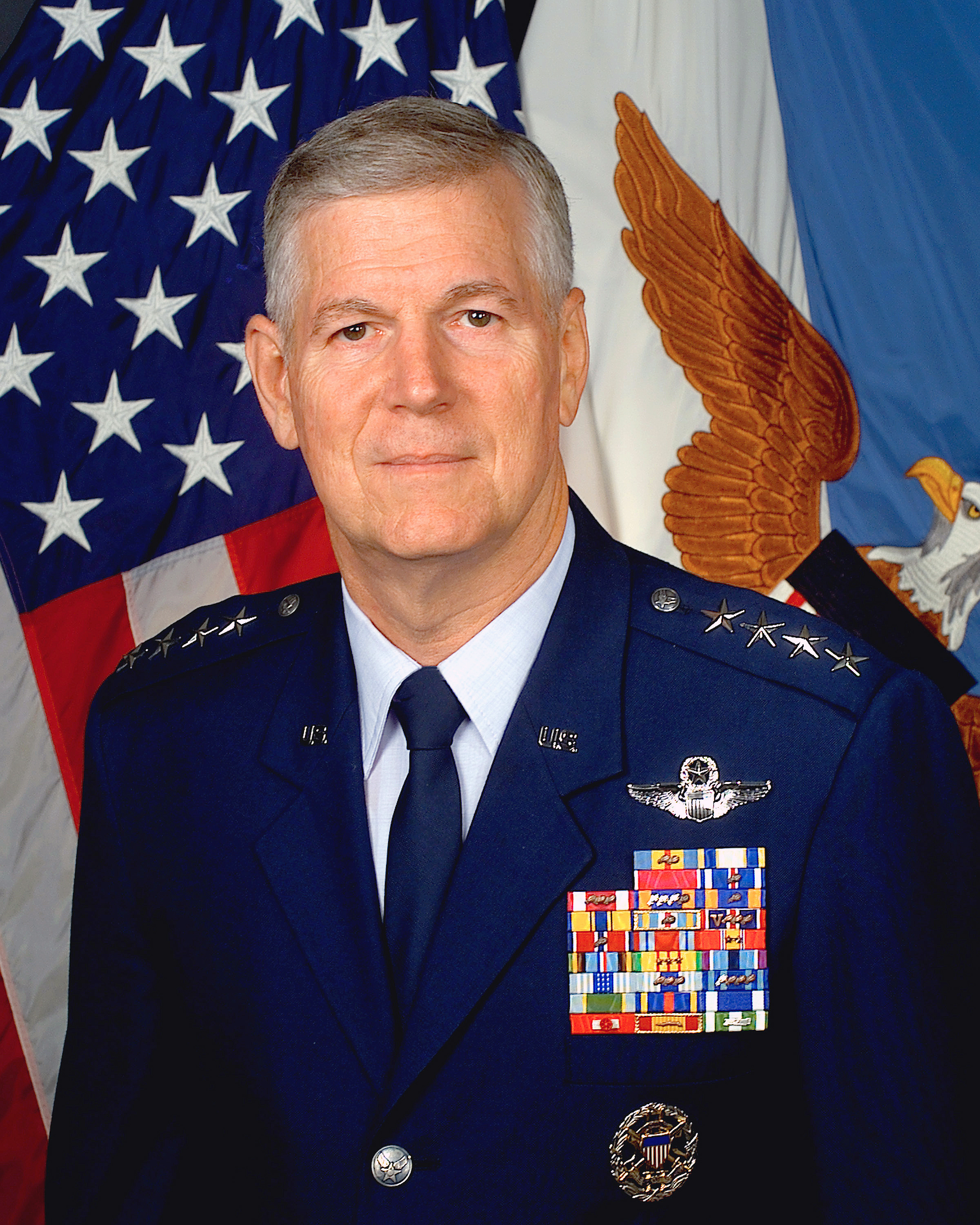
- Official portrait, 2002
- Born: Richard Bowman Myers; 1 March 1942 (age 84); Kansas City, Missouri, U.S.
- Alma mater: Kansas State University (BS); Auburn University, Montgomery (MBA)
- Military career
- Allegiance: United States
- Branch: United States Air Force
- Service years: 1965–2005
- Rank: General
- Commands: Chairman of the Joint Chiefs of Staff; Vice Chairman of the Joint Chiefs of Staff; North American Aerospace Defense Command; United States Space Command; Air Force Space Command; Pacific Air Forces; U.S. Forces Japan; Fifth Air Force
- Conflicts: Vietnam War; Iraq War
- Awards: Defense Distinguished Service Medal (4); Air Force Distinguished Service Medal (2); Army Distinguished Service Medal; Navy Distinguished Service Medal; Coast Guard Distinguished Service Medal; Legion of Merit; Distinguished Flying Cross (2); Air Medal (19); Presidential Medal of Freedom

Richard Bowman "Dick" Myers (born 1 March 1942) is a retired United States Air Force general who served as the 15th chairman of the Joint Chiefs of Staff. As chairman, Myers was the highest ranking uniformed officer of the United States military forces. He also served as the 14th president of Kansas State University from 2016 to 2022.

Myers became the chairman of the Joint Chiefs on 1 October 2001. In this capacity, he served as the principal military advisor to the president, the secretary of defense, and the National Security Council during the earliest stages of the war on terror, including planning and execution of the 2003 invasion of Iraq. On 30 September 2005, he retired and was succeeded by General Peter Pace. His Air Force career included operational command and leadership positions in a variety of Air Force and Joint assignments.

Myers began serving as the interim president of Kansas State University in late April 2016, and was announced as the permanent president on 15 November 2016. On 24 May 2021, Myers announced that we would be retiring from his duties as President of Kansas State University, and that his last day would be 11 February 2022. He was succeeded by President Richard Linton, the former dean of the College of Agriculture and Life Sciences at North Carolina State University on 14 February 2022.

== Early life ==
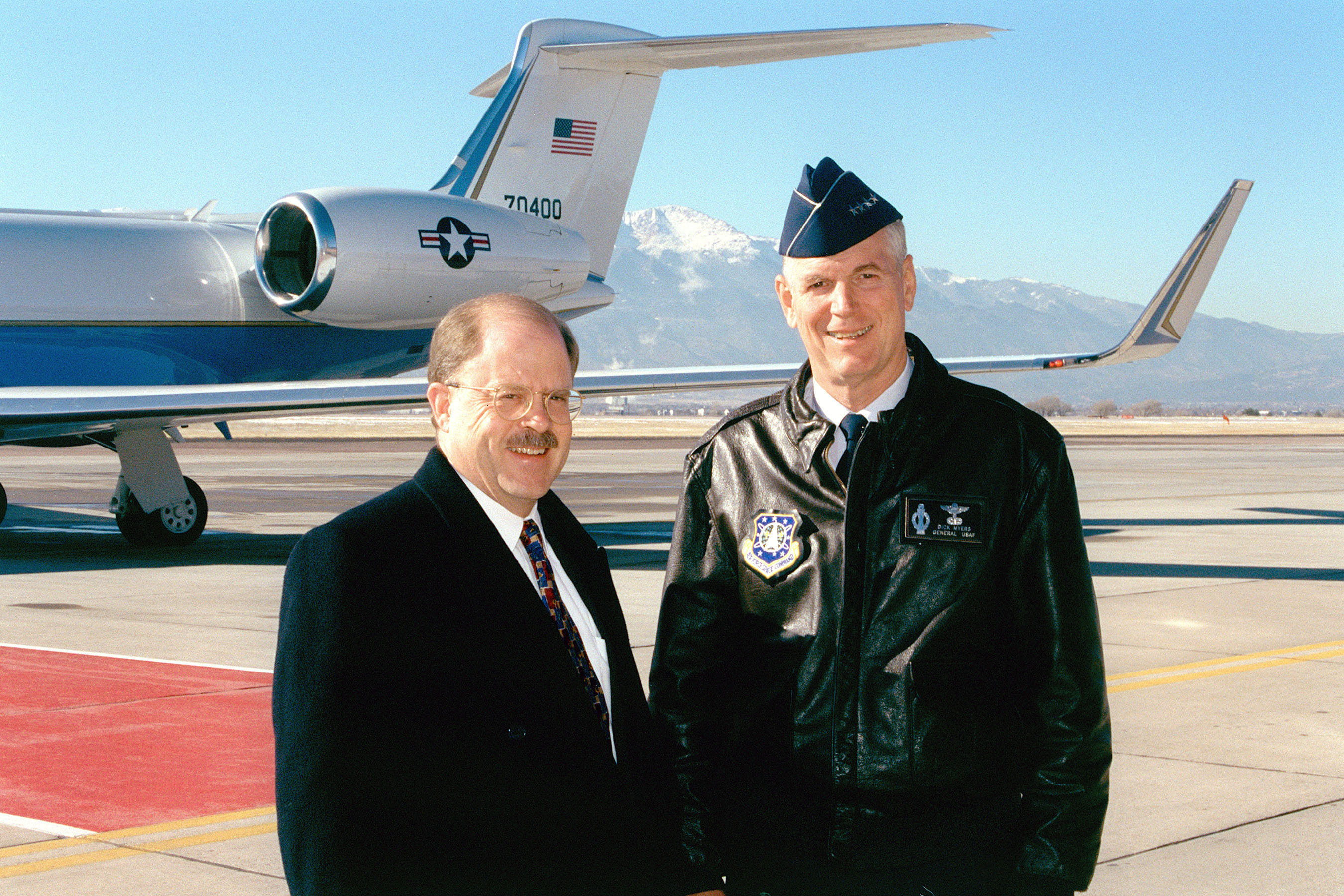
General Richard B. Myers during his tenure as Commander of the North American Aerospace Defense Command (NORAD) with Secretary of the Air Force F. Whitten Peters at Peterson Air Force Base, Colorado, on 12 October 1998

Myers was born in Kansas City, Missouri. His father owned a hardware store and his mother was a homemaker. He graduated from Shawnee Mission North High School in 1960. He graduated from Kansas State University (KSU) with a Bachelor of Science in mechanical engineering in 1965 where he was a member of Sigma Alpha Epsilon fraternity. He was commissioned by Detachment 270 of the Air Force Reserve Officer Training Corps at KSU. He graduated from Auburn University at Montgomery with a Master of Business Administration in 1977. Myers has attended the Air Command and Staff College at Maxwell Air Force Base, Alabama; the U.S. Army War College at Carlisle Barracks, Pennsylvania; and the Program for Senior Executives in National and International Security at Harvard University's John F. Kennedy School of Government.

Myers entered the United States Air Force in 1965 through the Reserve Officer Training Corps program. He received pilot training from 1965 to 1966 at Vance Air Force Base, Oklahoma. Myers is a command pilot with more than 4,100 flying hours in the T-33 Shooting Star, C-37, C-21, F-4 Phantom II, F-15 Eagle and F-16 Fighting Falcon, including 600 combat hours in the F-4. During his tenure as Chairman of the Joint Chiefs of Staff, Myers often flew official aircraft such as the Gulfstream C-37A and C-37B by himself during official trips. According to his 2009 autobiography (Eyes on The Horizon: Serving on the Front Lines of National Security), "one of the pleasures he had as both Chairman of the Joint Chiefs of Staff and Vice Chairman of the Joint Chiefs of Staff was to be able to sometimes fly on his required travels and stay pilot-qualified."

== Commander and Vice Chairman of the Joint Chiefs of Staff ==
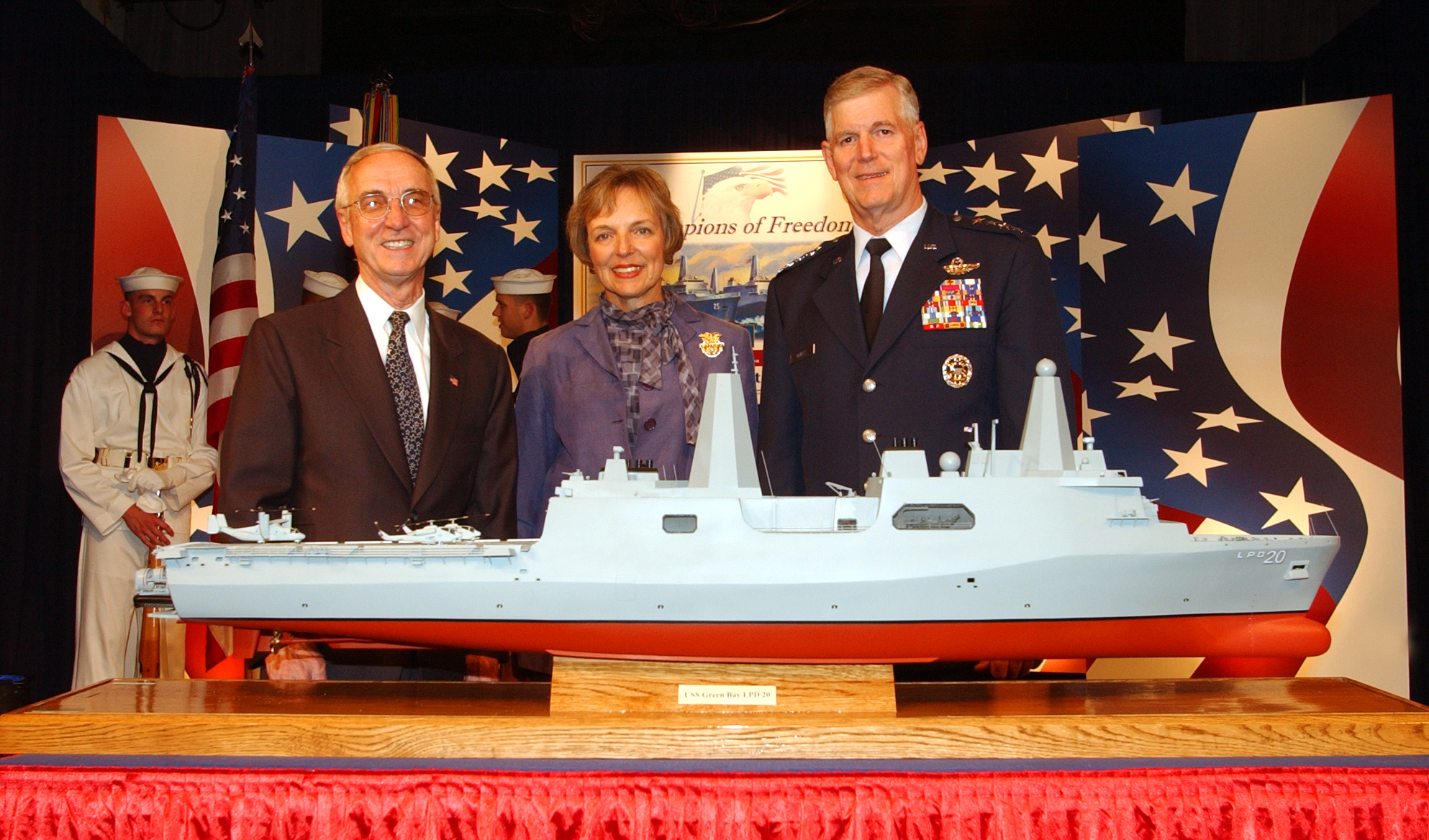
Gordon R. England, Mary Jo Myers, and General Myers in 2004.

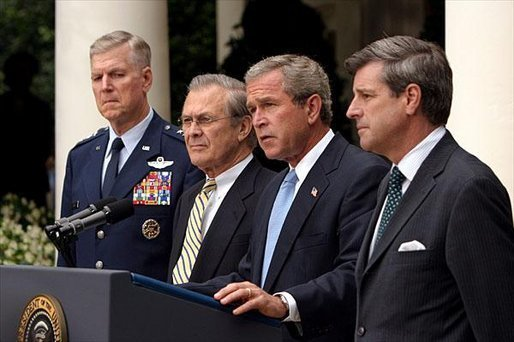
General Myers with Secretary of Defense Donald Rumsfeld, President George W. Bush and Presidential Envoy to Iraq Ambassador Paul Bremer during a press conference in the White House.

From November 1993 to June 1996, Myers was Commander of United States Forces Japan and Fifth Air Force at Yokota Air Base, Japan and From July 1996 to July 1997 Myers served as assistant to the chairman of the Joint Chiefs of Staff at the Pentagon. Myers received his fourth-star in 1997 when he was appointed as commander in chief of Pacific Air Forces. He commanded the Pacific Air Forces at Hickam Air Force Base, Hawaii, from July 1997 to July 1998. From August 1998 to February 2000, Myers was commander in chief of the North American Aerospace Defense Command and United States Space Command; Commander of the Air Force Space Command; and Department of Defense manager of the space transportation system contingency support at Peterson Air Force Base, Colorado. As commander, Myers was responsible for defending America through space and intercontinental ballistic missile operations.

Following the appointment of General Joseph Ralston as Supreme Allied Commander Europe (SACEUR), Myers was appointed by President Bill Clinton to succeed Ralston as Vice Chairman of the Joint Chiefs of Staff in February 2000. He assumed his duties on 29 February 2000. As vice chairman, Myers served as the chairman of the Joint Requirements Oversight Council, vice chairman of the Defense Acquisition Board, and as a member of the National Security Council Deputies Committee and the Nuclear Weapons Council. In addition, he acted for the chairman in all aspects of the Planning, Programming and Budgeting System including participation in the Defense Resources Board.

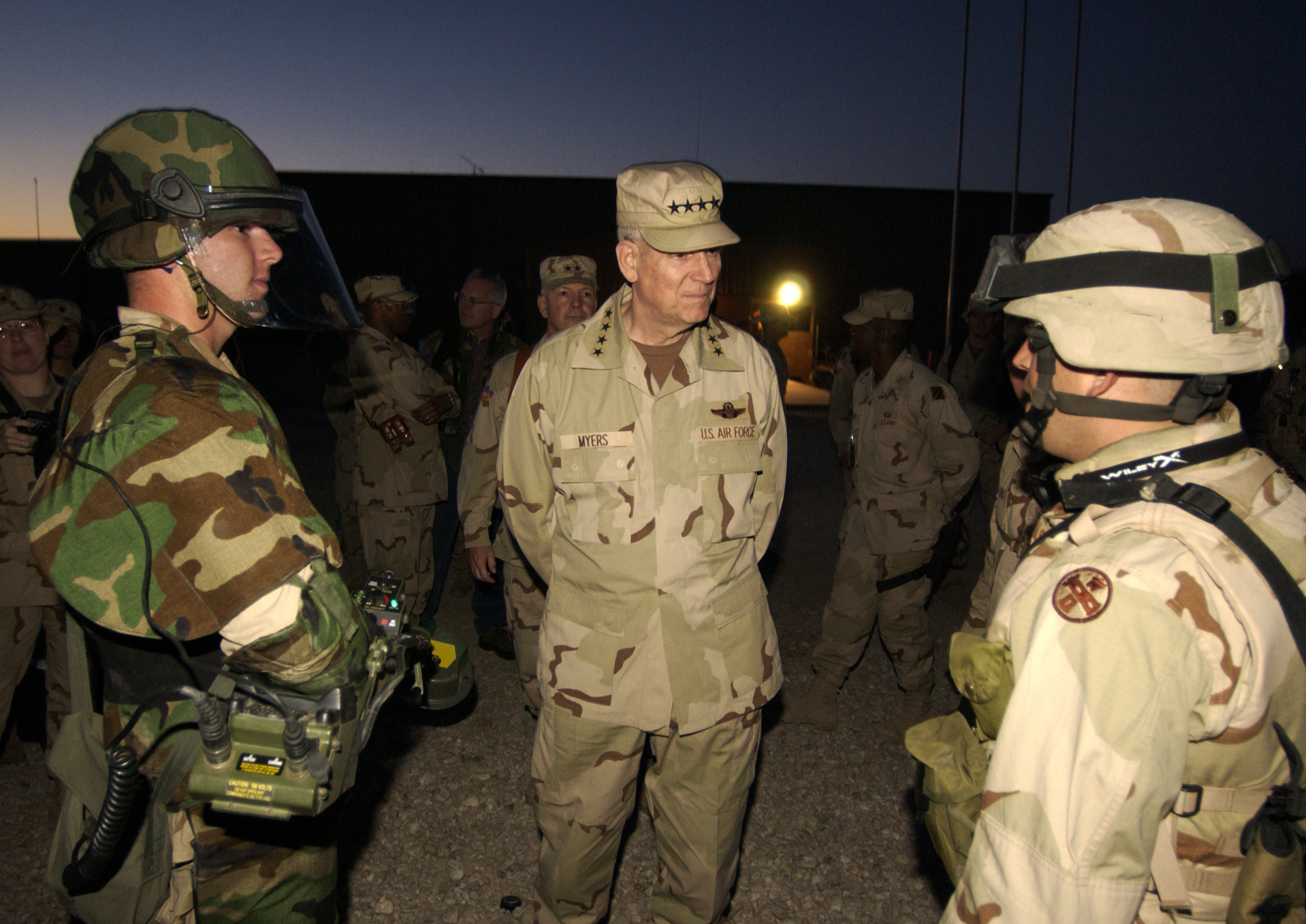
General Myers during a visit to Camp Victory, Iraq.

In August 2001, a year after assuming the role of Vice Chairman of the Joint Chiefs of Staff, President George W. Bush appointed Myers to be the next chairman of the Joint Chiefs of Staff. Myers was the first vice chairman of the Joint Chiefs of Staff to be appointed chairman, since the role was established in 1987 after the enactment of Goldwater–Nichols Act of 1986.

=== September 11 Attacks ===
On the morning of 11 September 2001 Myers was on Capitol Hill to meet Georgia Senator Max Cleland for his scheduled courtesy calls before his Senate confirmation hearings to be the next chairman of the Joint Chiefs of Staff. While waiting for the senator, Myers watched a television news network in the outer office of Senator Cleland that a plane had just hit the North Tower of the World Trade Center. A few minutes later Myers was informed by his military aide Captain Chris Donahue about the hijacked plane that just hit the second tower of the World Trade Center. Later on General Ralph Eberhart, the Commander-in-Chief of the North American Aerospace Defense Command, managed to contact Myers and inform him about the recent hijacking situation. Myers then immediately left Capitol Hill to proceed back to The Pentagon, where he was informed that this time another commercial airplane had just hit the western side of The Pentagon. During the crisis, Myers became the acting chairman of the Joint Chiefs of Staff, since General Hugh Shelton was en route to Europe for a NATO Summit. Upon arriving at The Pentagon and after a rendezvous with Secretary of Defense Donald Rumsfeld, Myers then conferred with Secretary Rumsfeld about the current situation and the next steps to be taken. Myers took command as the acting chairman of the Joint Chiefs of Staff for half of the day during the attacks on 11 September, until General Shelton arrived back in Washington after he aborted his flight to Europe at 5:40 p.m. local time.

== Chairman of the Joint Chiefs of Staff ==
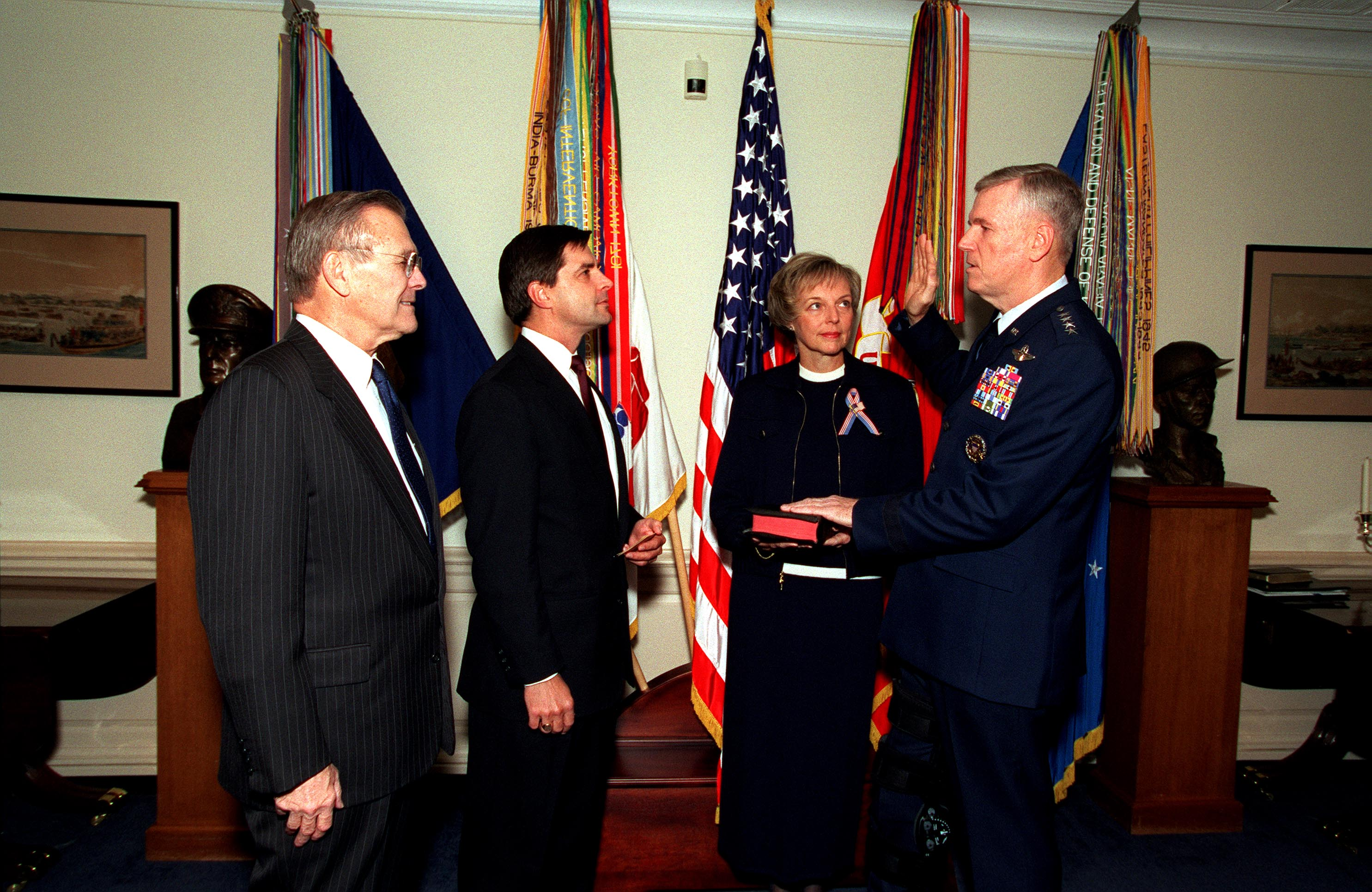
General Myers is sworn in as chairman of the Joint Chiefs of Staff by Department of Defense general counsel William J. Haynes II on 1 October 2001.

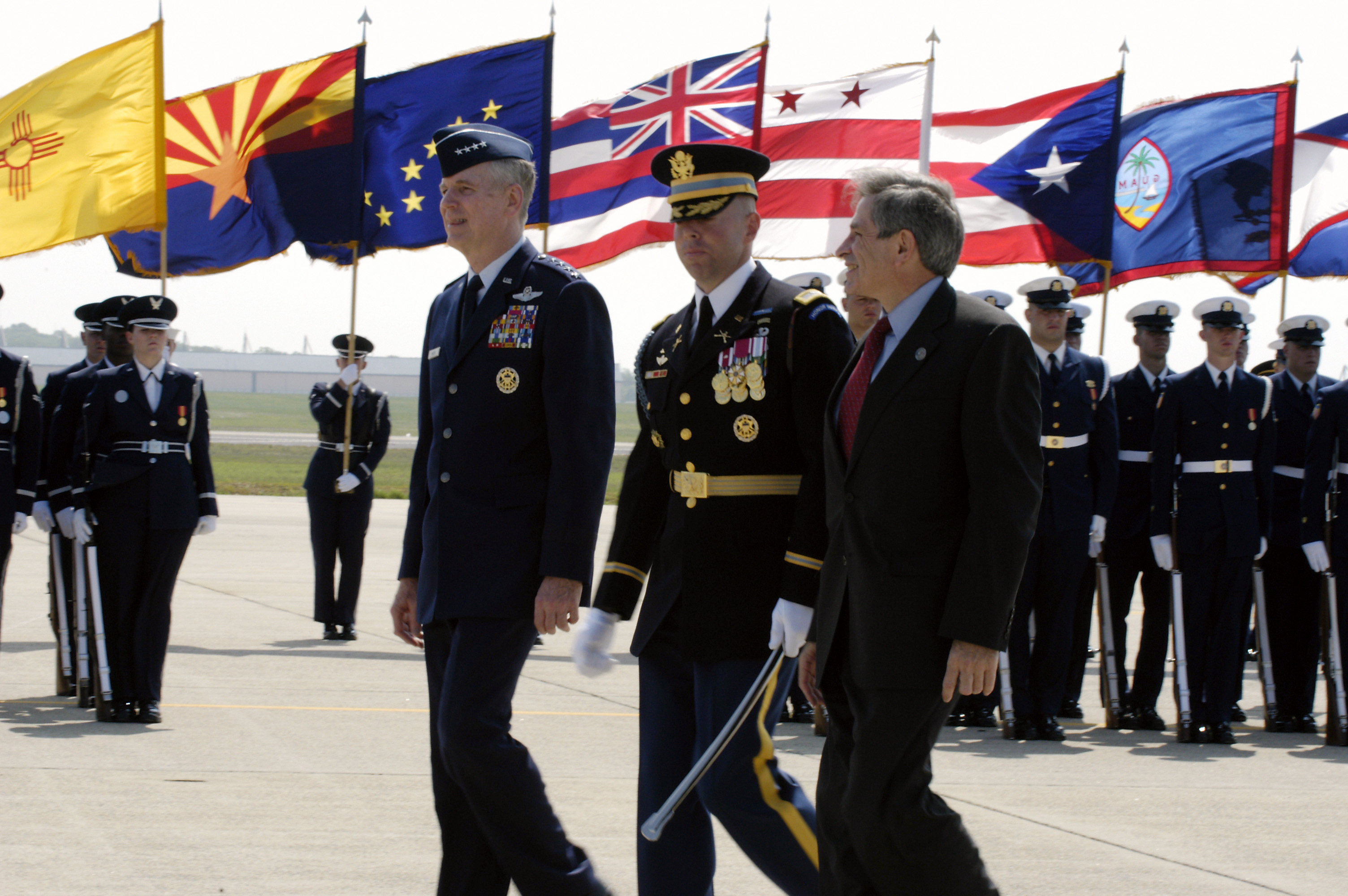
General Myers with Deputy Secretary of Defense Paul Wolfowitz at Andrews Air Force Base.

Myers was sworn in as the 15th chairman of the Joint Chiefs of Staff on 1 October 2001. He served as the principal military advisor to the president, the Secretary of Defense, and the National Security Council during the earliest stages of the war on terror, including planning of the War in Afghanistan and planning and execution of the 2003 invasion of Iraq. A few days later, on 7 October 2001, Operation Enduring Freedom was initiated. Myers and General Tommy Franks, the commander of United States Central Command (CENTCOM), coordinated the early stage of Operation Enduring Freedom. Within three months, several radical terrorist groups had been toppled.

Myers also supported the involvement of NATO and allied coalition forces during the war on terror. As a result of Operation Enduring Freedom, the political regime in Afghanistan was toppled and a new constitution was ratified in January 2004, which provided for direct presidential elections on 9 October 2004.

=== Operation Iraqi Freedom ===
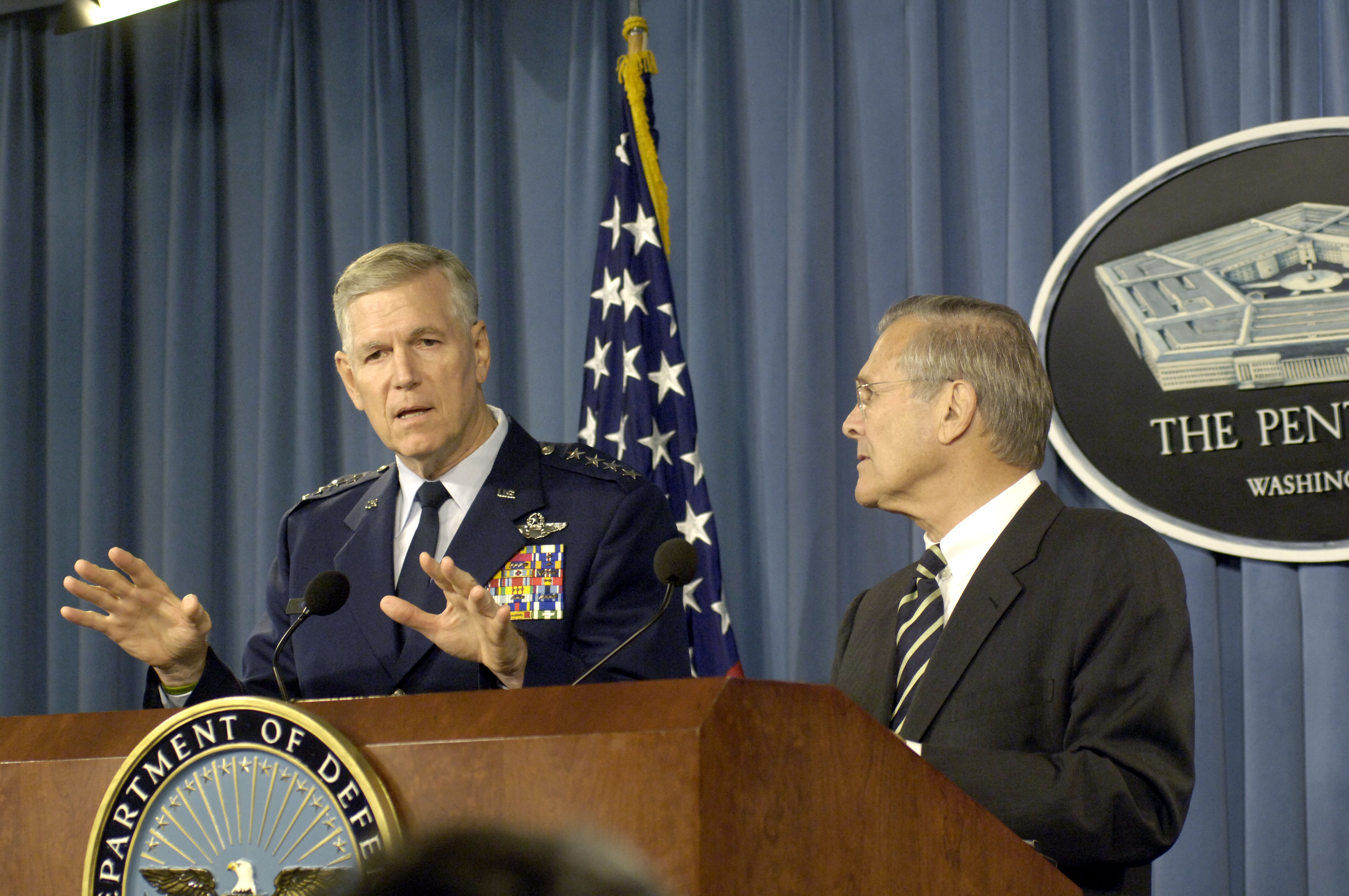
General Myers and Secretary of Defense Donald Rumsfeld during a press briefing in The Pentagon.

During his tenure as chairman, Myers also oversaw the early stage of the invasion of Iraq. Together with CENTCOM commander General Tommy Franks, Myers coordinated the plan for the Iraqi invasion and the reconstruction of the country, and also established a combined joint task force in order to focus on post-conflict issues in Iraq. Operation Iraqi Freedom was initiated on 20 March 2003, which was preceded by an airstrike on Saddam Hussein's Palace and followed by the Fall of Baghdad in April 2003. Operation Iraqi Freedom eventually led to the downfall of Saddam Hussein's 24-year regime and the captured of Hussein on 13 December 2003. Following Operation Iraqi Freedom, the Coalition Provisional Authority was established in Iraq and was succeeded by the Iraqi Interim Government, which presided over parliamentary elections in 2005.

In order to gain support on both the war on terror and the invasion of Iraq, Myers often travelled abroad in order to strengthen military relations with other allied nations, such as Mongolia. He was the first chairman of the Joint Chiefs of Staff to visit Mongolia. Myers met with Mongolian President Natsagiin Bagabandi at Ulaanbaatar on 15 January 2004. As a result, the United States gained the support of the Mongolian government and Mongolia also deployed troops in support of Operation Iraqi Freedom.

=== Military transformation ===
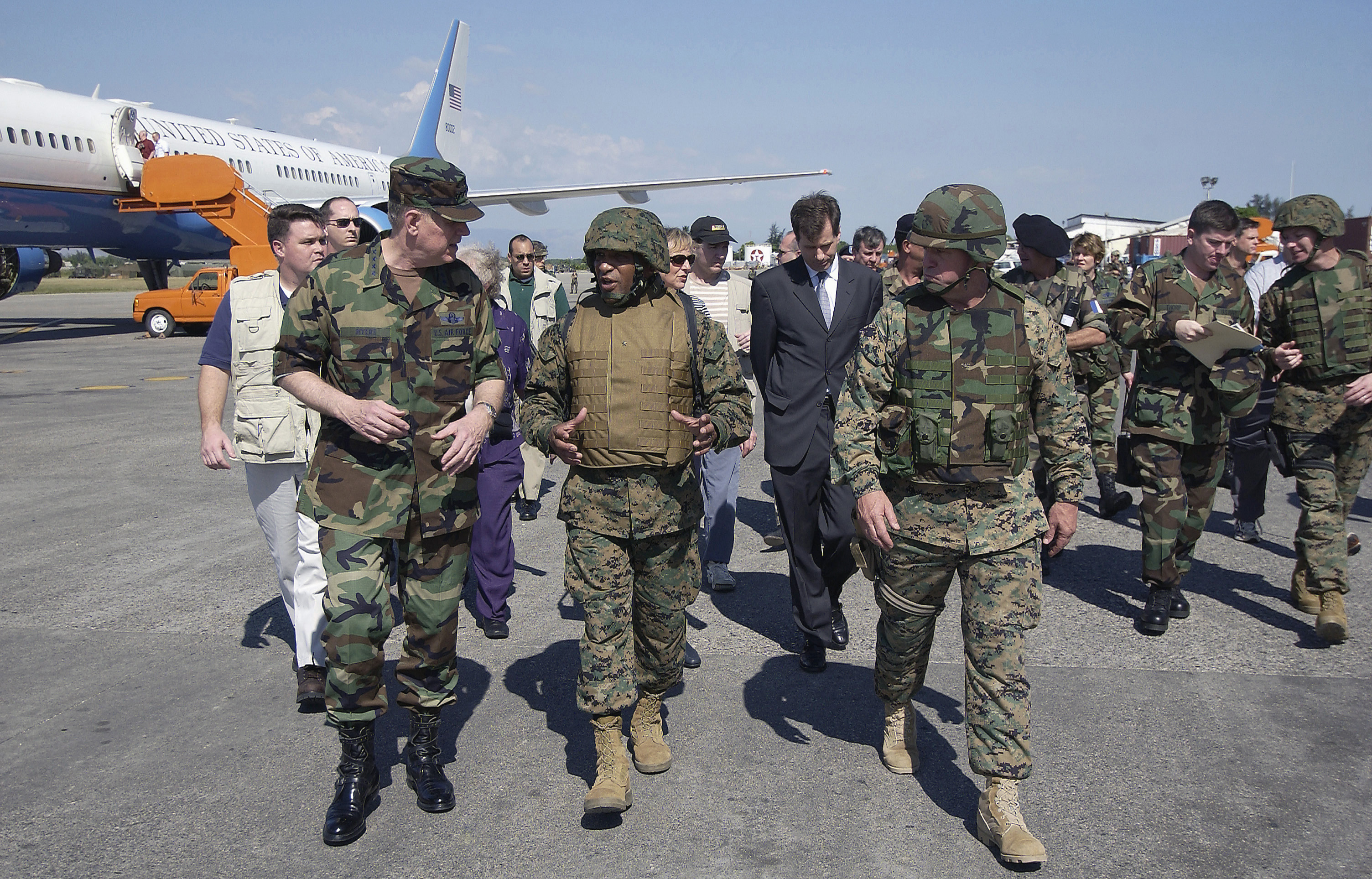
Myers with Brigadier General Ronald S. Coleman during a visit to Port-au-Prince to inspect U.S. troops deployed as part of peacekeeping operations in Haiti.

In February 2004 Haitian President Jean-Bertrand Aristide was overthrown in a coup d'état, leading to conflict within the country. The United States deployed Marines to Haiti as part of the multinational Operation Secure Tomorrow from February to July 2004. On March 13, Myers visited the United States troops deployed to Haiti.

Together with Secretary of Defense Donald Rumsfeld, Myers conducted weekly press briefings at The Pentagon on the war on terror.

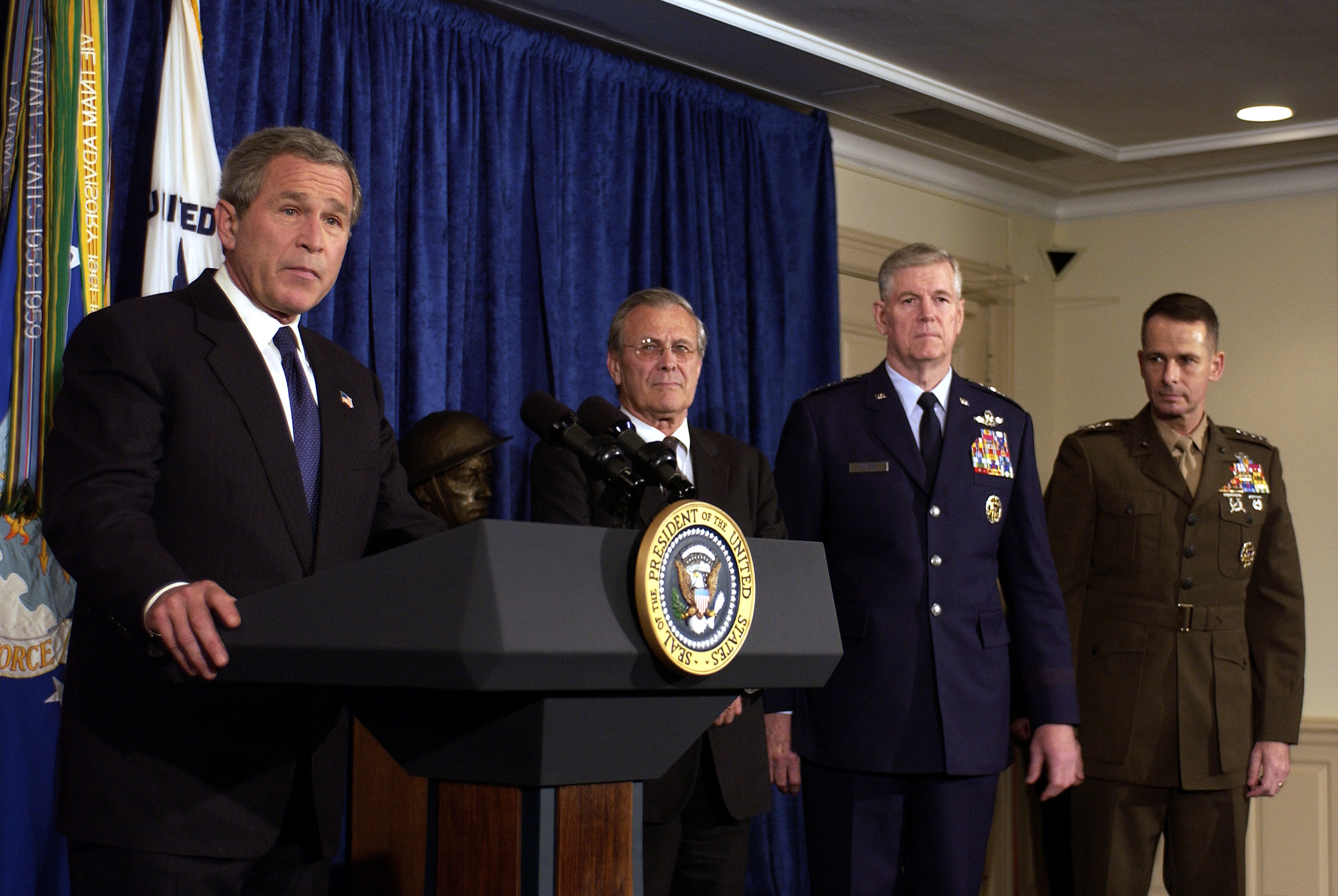
Myers with President George W. Bush and Secretary of Defense Donald Rumsfeld and General Peter Pace during a Press Conference at The Pentagon on 10 May 2004.

One of Myers' achievements as Chairman of the Joint Chiefs of Staff was his pursuit of the transformation of the United States military. Myers orchestrated substantive changes to the nation's Unified Combatant Command's plan following the September 11 attacks, leading to the establishment of United States Northern Command (USNORTHCOM) as the new Unified Combatant Command to consolidate and coordinate domestic defense. It was also to support local, state and federal authorities in order to assist the newly created Department of Homeland Security, especially in responding to national emergencies. Following the establishment of USNORTHCOM, the North American Aerospace Defense Command (NORAD) was also merged into USNORTHCOM and the United States Space Command was merged in to the United States Strategic Command (USSTRATCOM) in order to consolidate and strengthen the nation's nuclear deterrent and space missions. Like his predecessors, Myers also continued to promote a joint culture among the nation's military services in order to avoid interservice rivalry.

In order to emphasize the war on terror, Myers created what was known as "National Military Strategic Plan for the War on Terrorism 2002-2005." The Strategic Plan provided a new guidance to the Joint Chiefs of Staff, regional commanders and Unified Combatant Command commanders for a multi-pronged strategy that aimed at targeting global terrorist networks.

Myers' tenure as Chairman of the Joint Chiefs of Staff ended in September 2005 and he was succeeded by General Peter Pace, who had served as Myers' Vice Chairman of the Joint Chiefs Staff. Myers retired from active duty on 30 September 2005, after more than forty years of active service. His retirement ceremony was held at Fort Myer, Virginia, with President George W. Bush delivering the retirement remarks.

== Awards and decorations ==
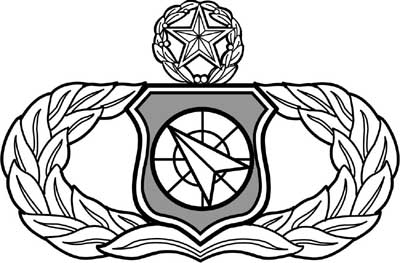
Command Pilot Badge
Master Space and Missile Badge
Office of the Joint Chiefs of Staff Identification Badge

Defense Distinguished Service Medal with three bronze oak leaf clusters
Air Force Distinguished Service Medal with oak leaf cluster
Army Distinguished Service Medal
Navy Distinguished Service Medal
Coast Guard Distinguished Service Medal
Legion of Merit
Distinguished Flying Cross with oak leaf cluster
Meritorious Service Medal with three oak leaf clusters
Air Medal (19 awards in total)
Air Medal
Air Force Commendation Medal
Joint Meritorious Unit Award with oak leaf cluster
Outstanding Unit Award with Valor V and three oak leaf clusters
Organizational Excellence Award with oak leaf cluster
Presidential Medal of Freedom
Combat Readiness Medal
National Defense Service Medal with two bronze service stars
Armed Forces Expeditionary Medal
Vietnam Service Medal with three campaign stars
Humanitarian Service Medal
Air Force Overseas Short Tour Service Ribbon
Air Force Overseas Long Tour Service Ribbon with three oak leaf clusters
Air Force Longevity Service Award (10 awards total)
Air Force Longevity Service Award
Small Arms Expert Marksmanship Ribbon
Air Force Training Ribbon
Commander of the Order of Military Merit (Canada)
Meritorious Service Cross, military version (Canada)
Légion d'honneur (France, degree of Commander)
Commemorative Medal of the Minister of Defense of the Slovak Republic First Class
Darjah Utama Bakti Cemerlang (Tentera) Singapore Distinguished Service Order (Military)
Grand Cross of the Order of Military Merit José María Córdova (Colombia)
Estonian Order of the Cross of the Eagle First Class
Order of the Paulownia Flowers, Grand Cordon (Japan)
Order of the Sacred Treasure, Grand Cordon (Japan)
Order of National Security Merit (South-Korea) Tong-il Medal
Companion of the Order of Military Merit Antonio Nariño (Colombia)
Order of the Star of Romania (Romanian: Steaua României), Grand Officer (Military)
Military Order of Italy, Grand Officer
Order of the Balkan Mountains, without ribbon, 2nd Class (Bulgaria)
Gallantry Cross (Vietnam) with palm
Vietnam Gallantry Cross Unit Citation
Vietnam Campaign Medal

Since 1999, General Myers is an Air Force Gray Eagle. He also received the Badge of the Commander of the Military Forces (Paraguay).

=== Other Recognition ===
In 2001, General Myers received the Golden Plate Award of the American Academy of Achievement presented by Awards Council member and Supreme Allied Commander Europe General Joseph W. Ralston, USAF.

== Flight information ==
- Rating: command pilot
- Flight hours: more than 4,100
- Aircraft flown: F-4, F-16, F-15, T-33, C-21 and C-37

== Effective dates of promotion ==
Insignia	Rank	Date
	Second Lieutenant	3 February 1965
	First Lieutenant	5 December 1966
	Captain	13 June 1968
	Major	1 September 1976
	Lieutenant colonel	1 December 1979
	Colonel	1 September 1984
	Brigadier general	1 April 1990
	Major general	1 September 1992
	Lieutenant General	12 November 1993
	General	1 September 1997

== Retirement and post-retirement ==
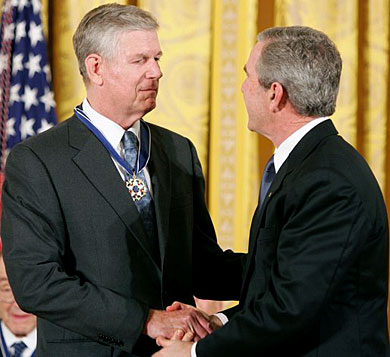
Myers receiving the Presidential Medal of Freedom.

On 27 September 2005, only three days before leaving his post as chairman, Myers said of the Iraq War that, "the outcome and consequences of defeat are greater than World War II." His rise to and stint as chairman are chronicled in Washington Post reporter Bob Woodward's book, State of Denial, as well as his own book Eyes on The Horizon: Serving on the Front Lines of National Security.

On 9 November 2005, Myers received the Presidential Medal of Freedom. His citation reads:

For four decades, General Richard Myers has served our Nation with honor and distinction. He flew some 600 combat hours in the Vietnam War. He later served as Commander in Chief of North American Aerospace Defense Command and U.S. Space Command. As Chairman of the Joint Chiefs of Staff, General Myers played a central role in our Nation's defense while devoting himself to the well-being of the men and women who wear the uniform of the United States Armed Forces. The United States honors General Richard Myers for his dedication to duty and country and for his contributions to the freedom and security of our Nation.

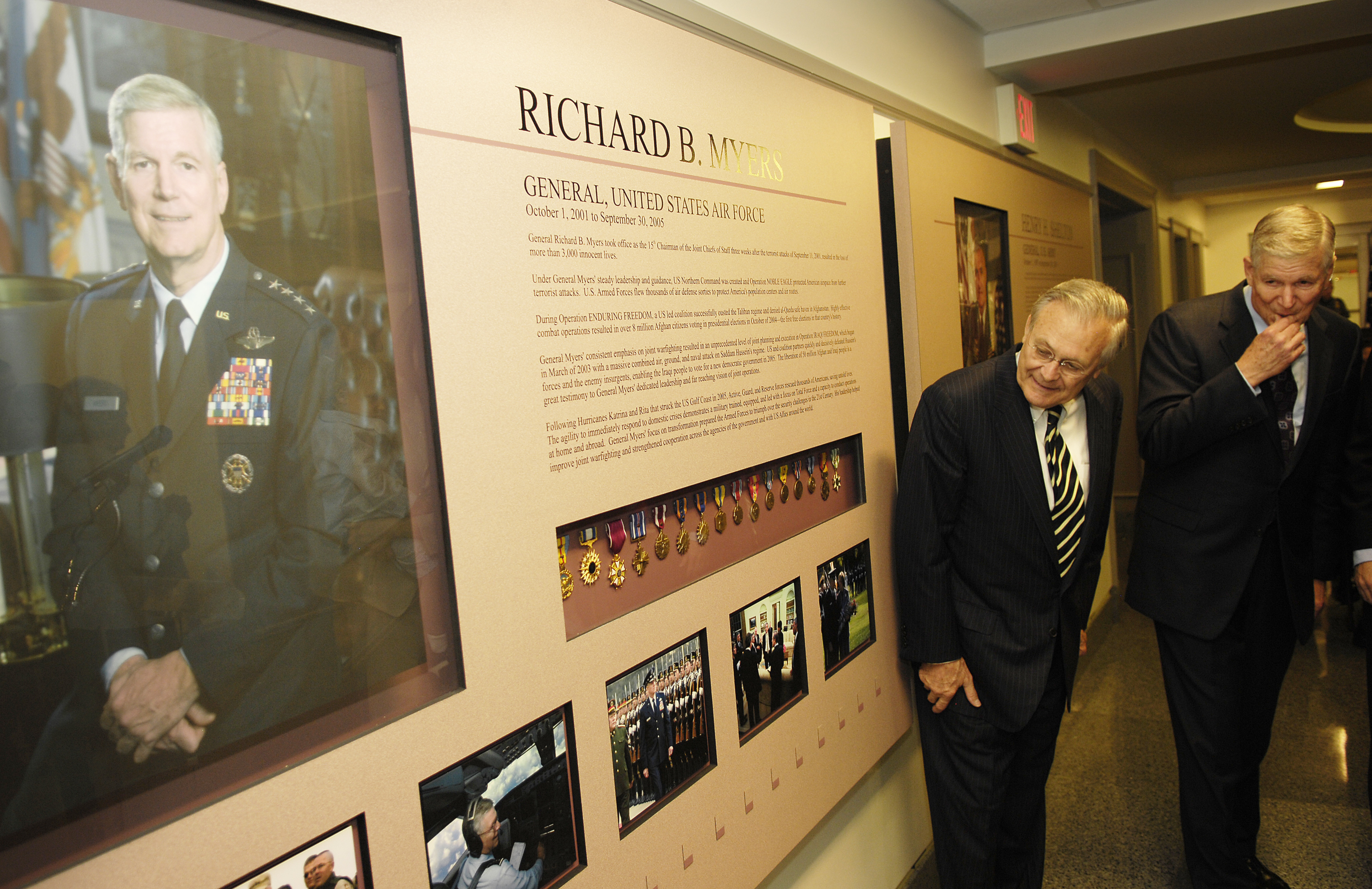
Myers and Donald Rumsfeld during the unveiling ceremony of Myers' portrait at The Pentagon on 24 April 2007.

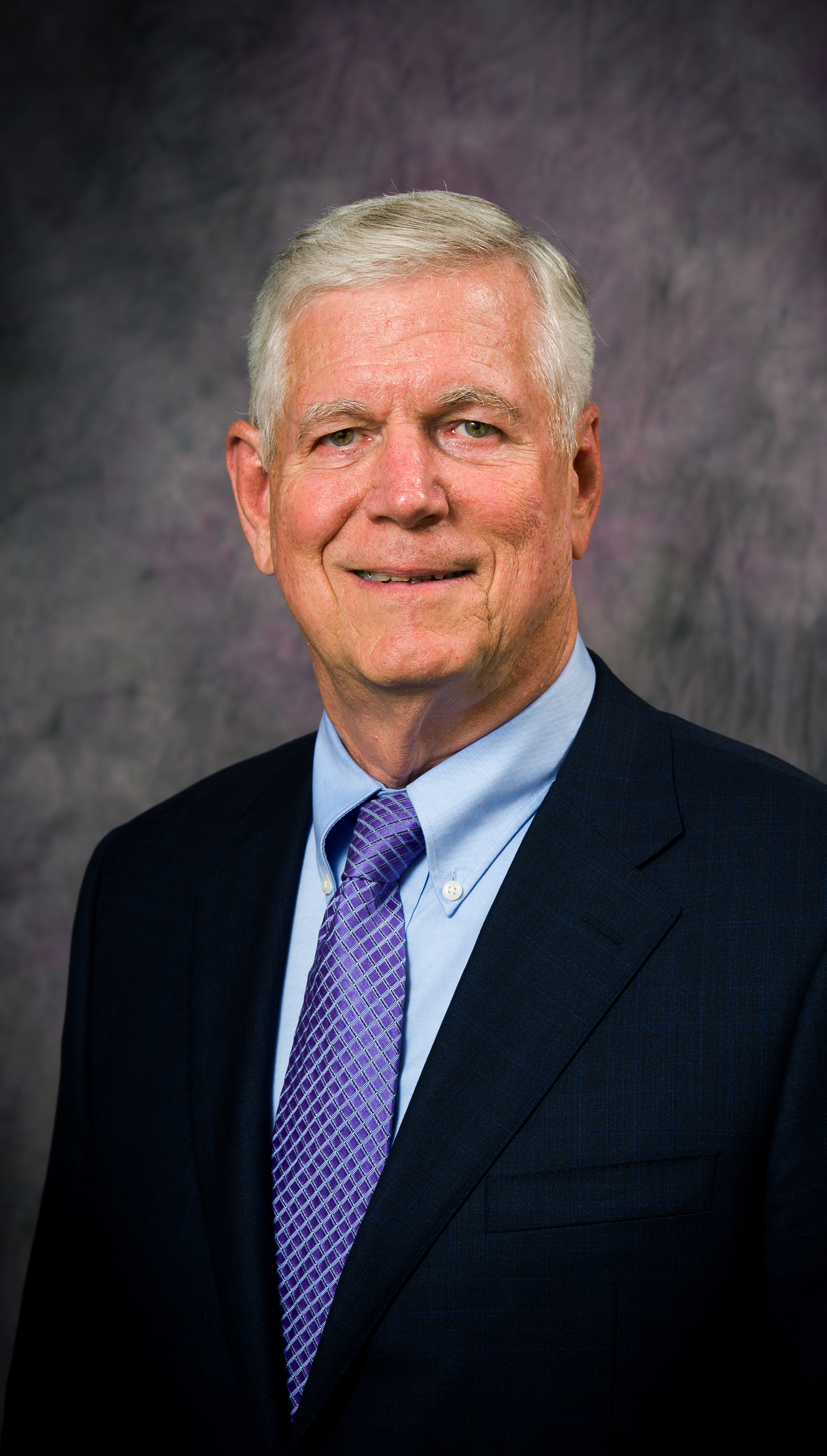
Myers' official portrait as President of Kansas State University, 2014

In 2006, Myers accepted a part-time appointment as a foundation professor of military history at Kansas State University. That same year, he was also elected to the board of directors of Northrop Grumman Corporation, the world's third largest defense contractor. On 13 September 2006, he also joined the board of directors of United Technologies Corporation. He also serves on the boards of Aon Corporation, John Deere, the United Service Organizations and holds the Colin L. Powell Chair for National Security, Leadership, Character and Ethics at the National Defense University. He also has advised the Defense Health Board and served on the Army War College Board of Visitors.

On 26 July 2011, Myers was inducted into the Air Force Reserve Officer Training Corps Distinguished Alumni in a ceremony at Maxwell AFB, Alabama, officiated by Lieutenant General Allen G. Peck, Commander, Air University.

On 14 April 2016, Myers was selected as the interim president of Kansas State University, which he began on 20 April. On 15 November 2016, the Board of Regents removed his interim title and announced Myers would become the university's 14th president.

Myers currently serves as chairman of the Board of Trustees of Medisend College of Biomedical Engineering Technology and the General Richard B. Myers Veterans Program. Medisend College of Biomedical Engineering Technology.

On May 24, 2021, Myers announced he would retire from his role as president of Kansas State University as of 11 February 2022. He released the following statement as part of his announced retirement, "Mary Jo and I truly loved our time at K-State and working with students, faculty and staff. Being president of my alma mater was one of the most fulfilling jobs I've ever had. It was an honor to help move K-State forward on many fronts. I'm grateful for the opportunity to work with the many talented and dedicated people who comprise the K-State family."

== Personal life ==
Myers and his wife, the former Mary Jo Rupp, have three children: two daughters and a son. His son´s name is Richard Bowman Myers.

== His publications ==
- Myers, Richard B., and Malcolm McConnell. Eyes on the Horizon: Serving on the Front Lines of National Security. New York: Threshold, 2009. ISBN 9781416560128

== Quotes ==
- "We train our people to obey the Geneva Conventions, it's not even a matter of whether it is reciprocated – it's a matter of who we are".

== Gallery ==
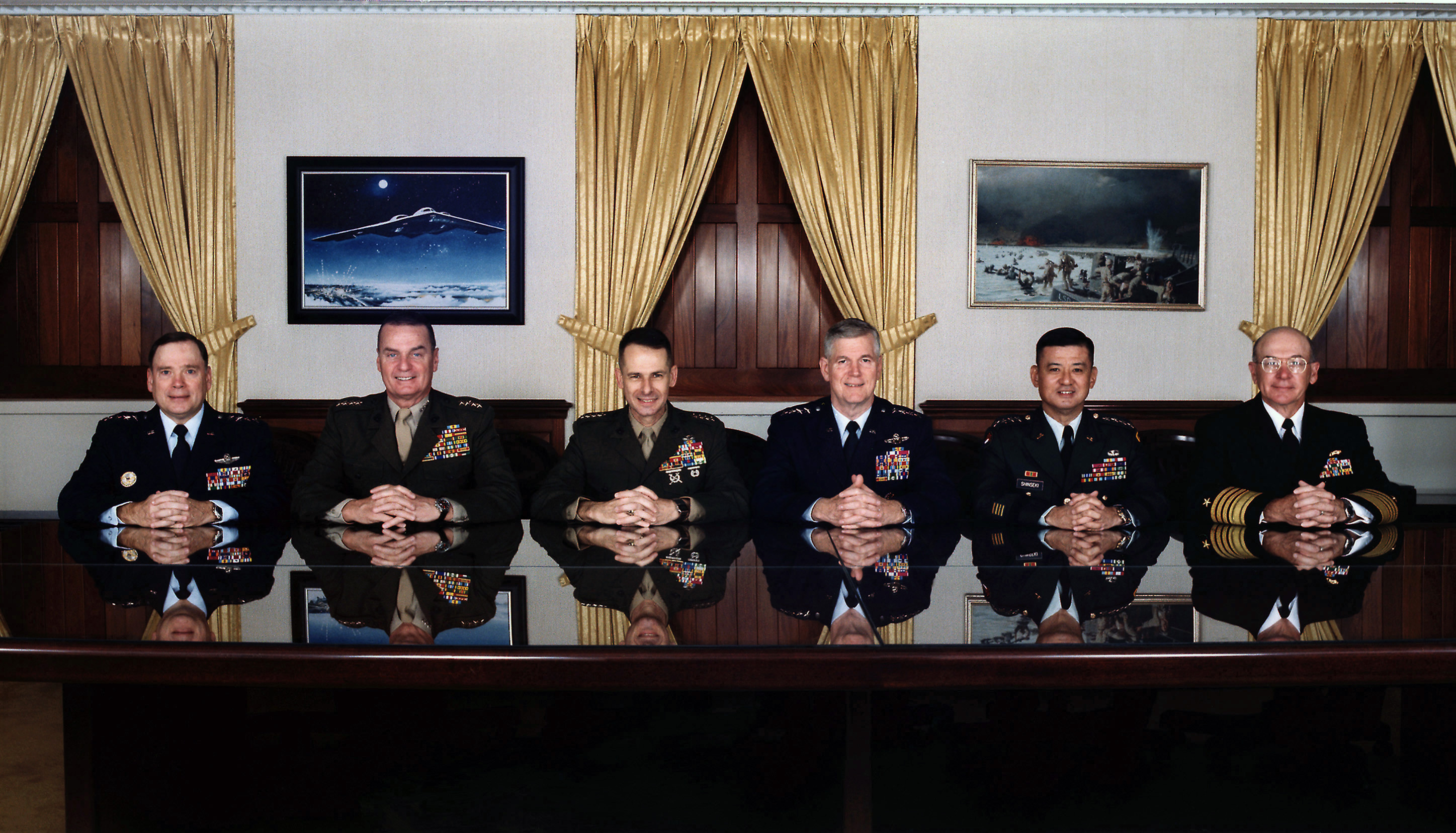
Chairman of the Joint Chiefs of Staff General Richard B. Myers with the other members of The Joint Chiefs of Staff in the Joint Chiefs of Staff Gold Room, also known as "The Tank" at The Pentagon on 14 December 2001.

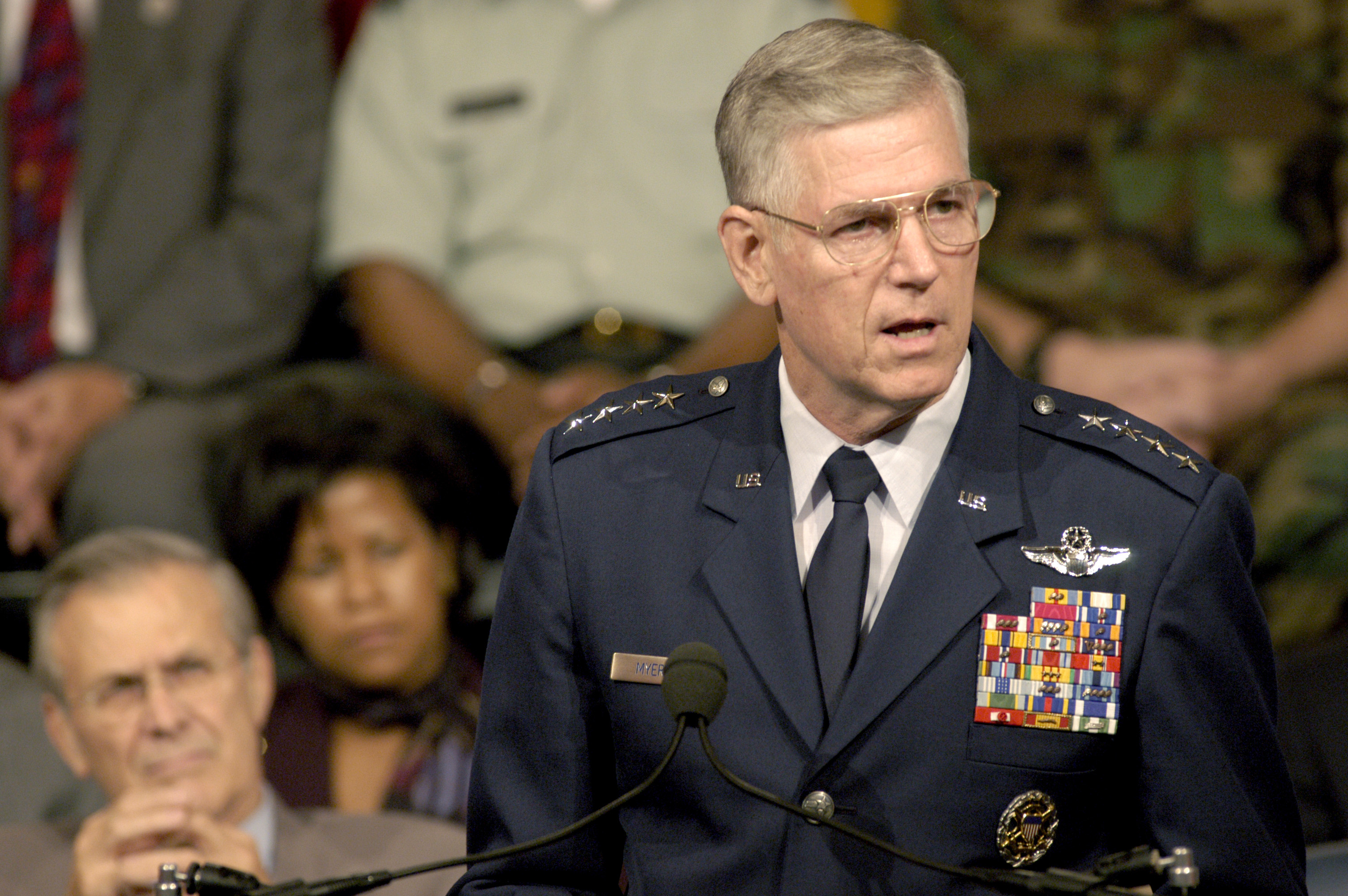
General Myers delivers his opening remarks during a town hall meeting at The Pentagon auditorium on 14 August 2003.

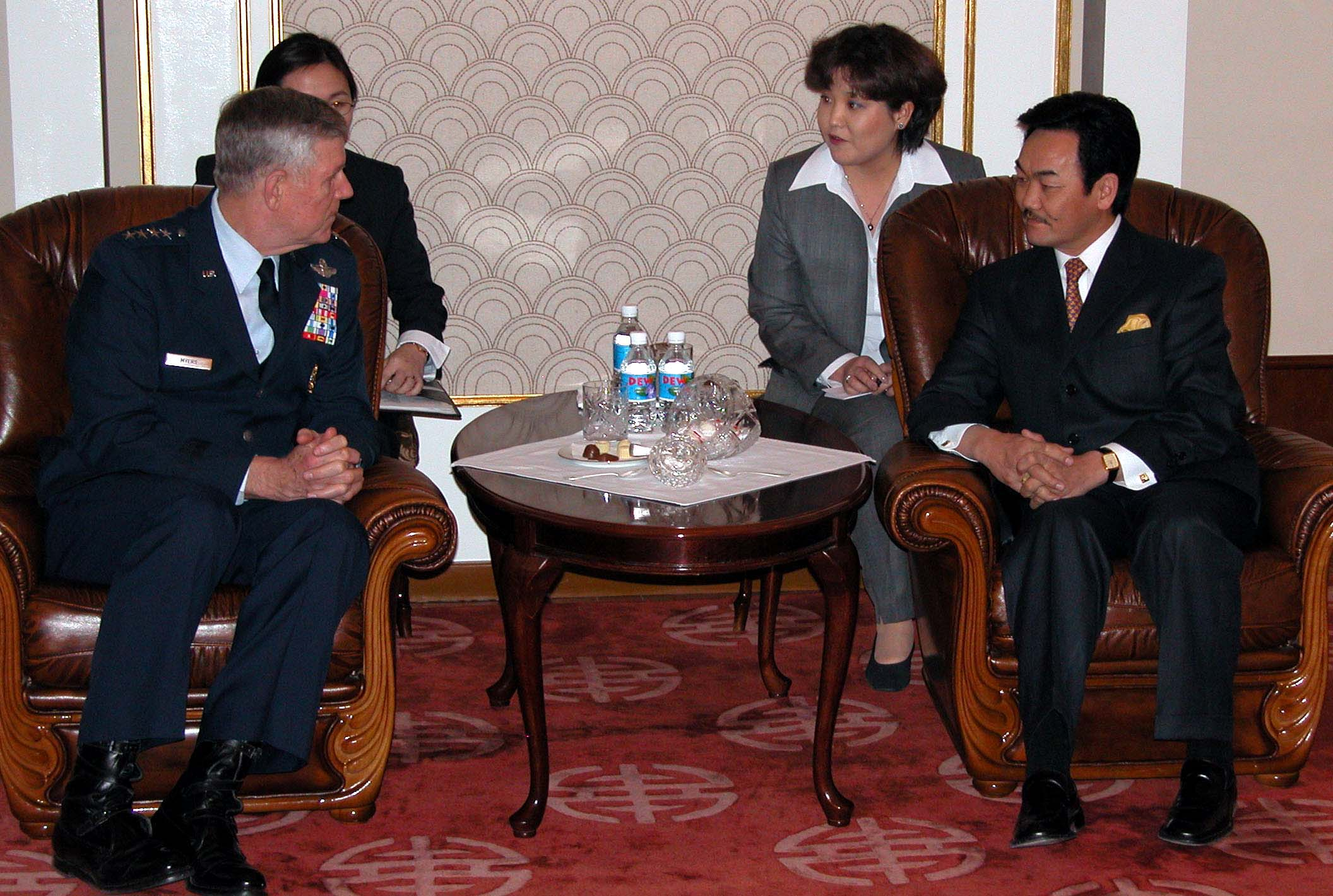
Chairman of the Joint Chiefs of Staff General Richard B. Myers with Mongolian President Natsagyiyn Bagabandi at Mongolian Government Palace during a visit to Ulaanbaatar, Mongolia on 13 January 2004.

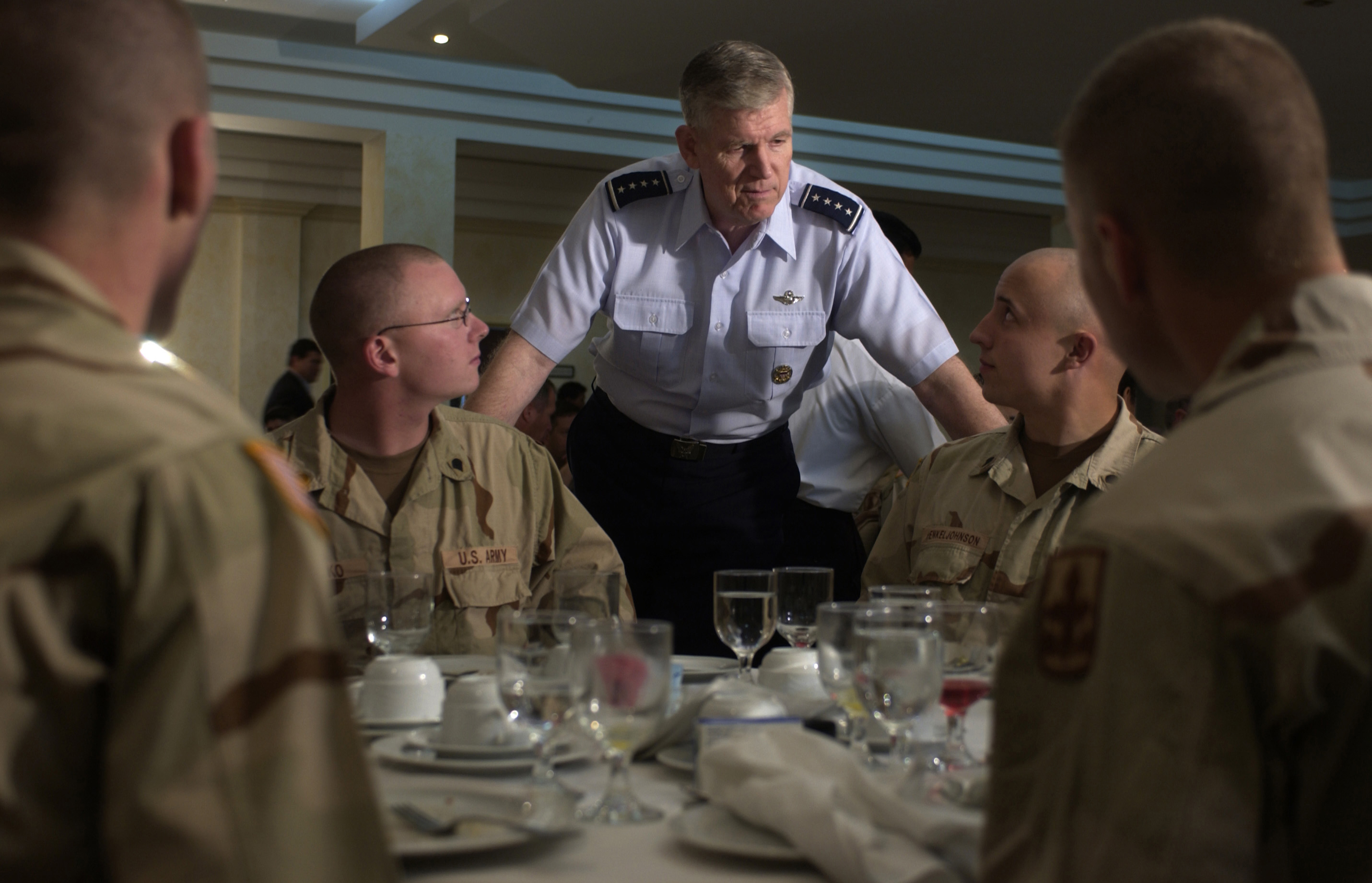
General Myers greeted U.S. service members deployed to Saudi Arabia on 17 March 2005.

== Notes ==
Military offices
Preceded by Howell M. Estes III	Commander of the North American Aerospace Defense Command; 1998–2000	Succeeded by Ralph Eberhart
Preceded by Joseph W. Ralston	Vice Chairman of the Joint Chiefs of Staff; 2000–2001	Succeeded by Peter Pace
Preceded by Hugh Shelton	Chairman of the Joint Chiefs of Staff; 2001–2005	Succeeded by Peter Pace
Academic offices
Preceded by Kirk Schulz	President of Kansas State University; 2016–2022	Succeeded by Richard Linton
U.S. order of precedence (ceremonial)
Preceded by Hugh Shelton as former Chair of the Joint Chiefs of Staff	Order of precedence of the United States as former Chair of the Joint Chiefs of Staff	Succeeded by Peter Pace as former Chair of the Joint Chiefs of Staff
