= Order of Military Merit Antonio Nariño =

Order of Military Merit Antonio Nariño Orden del Mérito Militar "Antonio Nariño"

Awarded by Colombia
- Awarded for: Exceptional military service to Colombia
- Status: Currently constituted
- Grand Master: President of Colombia
- Grand Chancellor: Minister of National Defence
- Grades: Grand Cross, Grand Officer, Commander, Officer, Knight, Companion

Precedence
- Next (higher): Medalla Servicios en "Guerra Internacional"
- Next (lower): Orden del Mérito Militar "José María Córdova"
- Ribbon bar of a Knight of the Order

The Order of Military Merit Antonio Nariño (Spanish: Orden del Mérito Militar "Antonio Nariño") is an order granted by Colombia. It is the highest order awarded for meritorious devotion to military duty.

== Grades ==
The Order of National Merit Antonio Nariño is awarded in the following grades:

- Grand Cross (Gran Cruz)
- Grand Officer (Gran Oficial)
- Commander (Comendador)
- Officer (Oficial)
- Knight (Caballero)
- Companion (Compañero)

Ribbon bars of the Order of Military Merit Antonio Nariño
Grand Cross	Grand Officer	Commander
Officer	Knight	Companion
