= Veselin Jungić =

Canadian mathematician (born 1955)

- Born: June 12, 1955 (age 71)
- Education: University of Sarajevo (BS); University of Zagreb (MS); Simon Fraser University (Ph.D.)
- Scientific career
- Fields: Mathematics
- Workplaces: Simon Fraser University
- Doctoral advisor: Tom Brown

Veselin Jungić (born June 12, 1955) is a Canadian mathematician who is a professor emeritus of mathematics at the Simon Fraser University, in its Department of Mathematics. His research interests are in Ramsey theory and mathematical education.

== Early life and education ==
Veselin Jungić was born in the city of Banja Luka in former Yugoslavia and completed his undergraduate degree in mathematics at the University of Sarajevo, Bosnia and Herzegovina, earning a Bachelor of Science in 1977. He then pursued a master's degree in mathematics at the Faculty of Science, University of Zagreb in Croatia. In 1992, Jungić and his family moved to Vancouver, British Columbia, to escape the Bosnian War. He continued his academic journey in mathematics, earning his Ph.D. in 1999 from Simon Fraser University under the supervision of Tom Brown. His Ph.D. thesis was titled Elementary, Topological, and Experimental Approaches to the Family of Large Sets.

== Career and research ==
After completing his Ph.D., Jungić began his academic career in Canada as a Postdoctoral Fellow in the Department of Mathematics at the University of British Columbia under the supervision of David William Boyd. From 2001 to 2006, he served as a lecturer at Simon Fraser University's Department of Mathematics. In 2007, he was promoted to Senior Lecturer in the same department. In 2015, Jungić was appointed Teaching Professor at Simon Fraser University, a position he held until his retirement in 2025.

Jungić's academic research primarily focuses on Ramsey Theory. In one of his early papers, Rainbow Arithmetic Progressions and Anti-Ramsey Results, Jungić and a group of researchers explored rainbow Ramsey Theory, investigating the existence of rainbow arithmetic progressions, where each element is a distinct color. The paper demonstrates that any 3-coloring of the natural numbers, with each color appearing at least 1/6 of the time, must contain a 3-term rainbow arithmetic progression. The study extends these findings to similar colorings of the integers and discusses the broader implications for anti-Ramsey theory.

Jungić has also written numerous papers and articles aimed at promoting Ramsey Theory to a broader audience within the mathematical community.

In addition, Jungić has contributed extensively to Crux Mathematicorum, authoring articles that present problems, examples, and notes on topics such as the Hales-Jewett Theorem, Ramsey Theorem, the chromatic number of the plane problem, and van der Waerden's Theorem.

Jungić's research also encompasses a broad range of educational initiatives, with a focus on innovative teaching strategies and experimental mathematics. His work in large-class pedagogy addresses the challenges faced by both students and instructors, emphasizing the importance of building dialogue and mutual trust in such environments. He has also explored experimental mathematics, using dynamic visual models to bridge ancient ideas with modern technologies, offering fresh insights into mathematical education

== Math Catcher Outreach program ==
Since its inception in 2011, the Math Catcher Outreach program, developed by Jungić, has aimed to promote mathematics among elementary and high school students by demonstrating its relevance in everyday life and decision-making. The program places a strong emphasis on Indigenous education, creating learning resources in various First Nations languages. It includes original stories, problem-solving activities, and hands-on tasks, ensuring that math education is enjoyable, inclusive, and culturally relevant for young learners. Map of the places visited by the Math Catcher Outreach Program

== Awards and honours ==
Veselin Jungić was inducted into the Canadian Mathematical Society's 2021 Class of Fellows, recognizing his significant contributions to mathematics education, research, and service within the Canadian mathematical community. This Fellowship honors members who have demonstrated excellence in their field and provided distinguished service to Canada's mathematical community, highlighting Jungić's ongoing commitment to advancing mathematics education.

In 2020, Veselin Jungić received the Adrien Pouliot Award for his outstanding contributions to mathematics education, particularly through his leadership in the Math Catcher Outreach Program and initiatives that enhance learning experiences for Canadian post-secondary students. He co-organizes the Teaching Matters Seminar Series at Simon Fraser University and collaborates on educational initiatives like the "First Year Math and Stats in Canada" program.

In 2015, Veselin Jungić was awarded the 3M National Teaching Fellowship, a highly respected recognition for excellence in educational leadership and teaching at the university and college level. Conferred by the Society for the Scholarship of Teaching and Learning in Higher Education (STLHE), this Fellowship acknowledges Dr. Jungić's exceptional contributions to teaching and learning in Canadian post-secondary education. As a recipient, Jungić became a member of the STLHE Council of Fellows, joining a distinguished group of educators committed to advancing the quality of education in Canada.

Veselin Jungić was awarded the 2012 CMS Excellence in Teaching Award for his innovative contributions to undergraduate mathematics education at Simon Fraser University. His pioneering use of online tools in large calculus classes, along with his dedication to student success and integration of Indigenous culture into mathematics education, underscores his effectiveness as an educator.

In 2011, Veselin Jungić received the PIMS Education Prize from the Pacific Institute for the Mathematical Sciences for his role in enhancing public awareness and appreciation of mathematics. His contributions include leading educational programs like "Taste of Pi" for high school students, mentoring Indigenous students, and creating the animated film "Small Number Counts to 100," which integrates Indigenous storytelling into mathematics lessons.

== Other publications ==
In 2023, Veselin Jungić published Basics of Ramsey Theory, an introductory textbook aimed at undergraduate students. The book is designed to introduce readers to Ramsey theory, a mathematical field at the intersection of number theory and combinatorics.

In the same year, Jungic co-authored a textbook on differential calculus with Petra Menz and Randall Pyke, both from Simon Fraser University. The book offers over 900 problems covering key topics like limits, continuity, derivatives, and their applications, including optimization and curve sketching.

Veselin Jungić is the creator and producer of the podcast No Strangers At This Party, which celebrates Ramsey theory and the mathematicians working in this vibrant field. The podcast features interviews with contemporary mathematicians who are actively engaged in Ramsey theory, discussing their early experiences with mathematics, their academic journeys, and their perspectives on Ramsey theory and mathematics as a whole.

Jungić has contributed several writings addressing key issues in education, including the significance of mathematics, personal academic challenges, and the impact of academic dishonesty. Through a combination of personal reflection and professional insight, these works highlight the importance of integrity, perseverance, and the role of mathematics in developing critical thinking skills. His writings advocate for a deeper understanding of the educational process and the promotion of academic honesty.
