= Elizabeth Sterling Haynes =

Canadian theatre activist

- Born: Elizabeth Sterling; December 7, 1897; Seaham, County Durham, England
- Died: April 26, 1957 (aged 59); Toronto, Ontario, Canada
- Education: University of Toronto (BA)

Elizabeth Sterling Haynes (December 7, 1897 – April 26, 1957) was an Alberta theatre activist. Haynes was a driving force in the Little Theatre Movement in Alberta.

== Early life ==
Elizabeth Sterling was born in Seaham, County Durham, England, in 1897. Her family emigrated to Ontario, Canada in 1905. Beginning in 1916, she completed a Bachelor of Arts degree at the University of Toronto, attending the University of Victoria College. From their 1917 founding, Sterling was involved with the Victoria College Women's Dramatic Club (VCWDC). From 1918-19, she served as the club's vice president; she was elected president the following year. While working with the VCWDC, Sterling was influenced by Roy Mitchell, a leader of the Canadian Little Theatre Movement. At the University of Toronto, Sterling was one of the first actors to perform at the Hart House Theatre.

After university, Sterling taught for a year in upper New York state. In 1921, she married Nelson Willard Haynes, a dentist. They moved to Edmonton in 1922, where she soon established herself as a director, actor and teacher.

== Career ==
Upon relocating to Edmonton, Sterling Haynes began directing productions with the University of Alberta. In 1928, she founded the Alberta Drama League together with Ernest Sterndale Bennett, which became a model for the Dominion Drama Festival. In 1929, she was asked to teach drama to school teachers both through the University of Alberta and Alberta's department of education.

Sterling Haynes was a major figure in the Little Theatre movement in Alberta. She was a driving force in developing the Edmonton Little Theatre. She was the company's first artistic director, serving from 1929 to 1932.

In 1933, she became provincial drama specialist at the Department of Extension of the University of Alberta, and it was from this post that she began to recreate much of Alberta's theatre scene. She wrote technical works and broadcast her reviews and lessons on radio. She travelled the province, to school and community groups, coaching them, demonstrating and adjudicating competitions. 1933 was also the year she co-founded the Banff Centre for the Arts.

== Personal life ==
Haynes' health began to decline in the 1940s and 50s. She and her husband moved east, away from Edmonton, in 1955. After living briefly in Toronto with their daughter, the Haynes moved to Clinton, Ontario.

== Death and legacy ==
Haynes died on April 26, 1957, in Toronto.

Said Gwen Pharis Ringwood of her:

Elizabeth was a force; a creative energy unleashed at a time when creativity was suspect and in a place where creativity was often ignored in the hope that it would go away.

Edmonton's Sterling Awards are named in her honour.
