= David Hilbert Award =

Annual mathematics award

- Description: For contribution to the promotion of mathematics globally and enrichment of mathematics learning
- Country: International
- Presented by: World Federation of National Mathematics Competitions (WFNMC)
- First award: 1991
- Website: www.wfnmc.org/hilbert.html

The David Hilbert Award, named after David Hilbert, was established by the World Federation of National Mathematics Competitions (WFNMC) to acknowledge mathematicians who have contributed to the development of mathematics worldwide.

Each awardee is selected by the Executive and Advisory Committee of the World Federation of National Mathematics Competitions on the recommendation of the WFNMC Awards Subcommittee.

The award is no longer active in its original form. In 1996, the WFNMC decided to merge the David Hilbert Award with the Paul Erdős Award. Today, only the Paul Erdős Award is presented, though it carries the same prestige and criteria as the two previous awards combined.

== Past recipients ==
- 1991 (Note: The 1991 awardees were selected under a different criterion. That of writing the most interesting articles from previous years in the World Federation National Mathematics Competitions Journal.)
  - Edward Barbeau, Canada
  - Arthur Engel, Germany
  - Graham Pollard, Australia
- 1992
  - Martin Gardner, United States of America
  - Murray Klamkin, United States of America
  - Marcin E. Kuczma, Poland
- 1994
  - María Falk de Losada, United States of America
  - Peter J. O'Halloran, Australia
- 1996
  - Andy Liu, Canada

== See also ==
- List of mathematics awards

== Sources ==
- Homepage of the award.
