= Malgorzata Dubiel =

Polish mathematician and mathematics educator

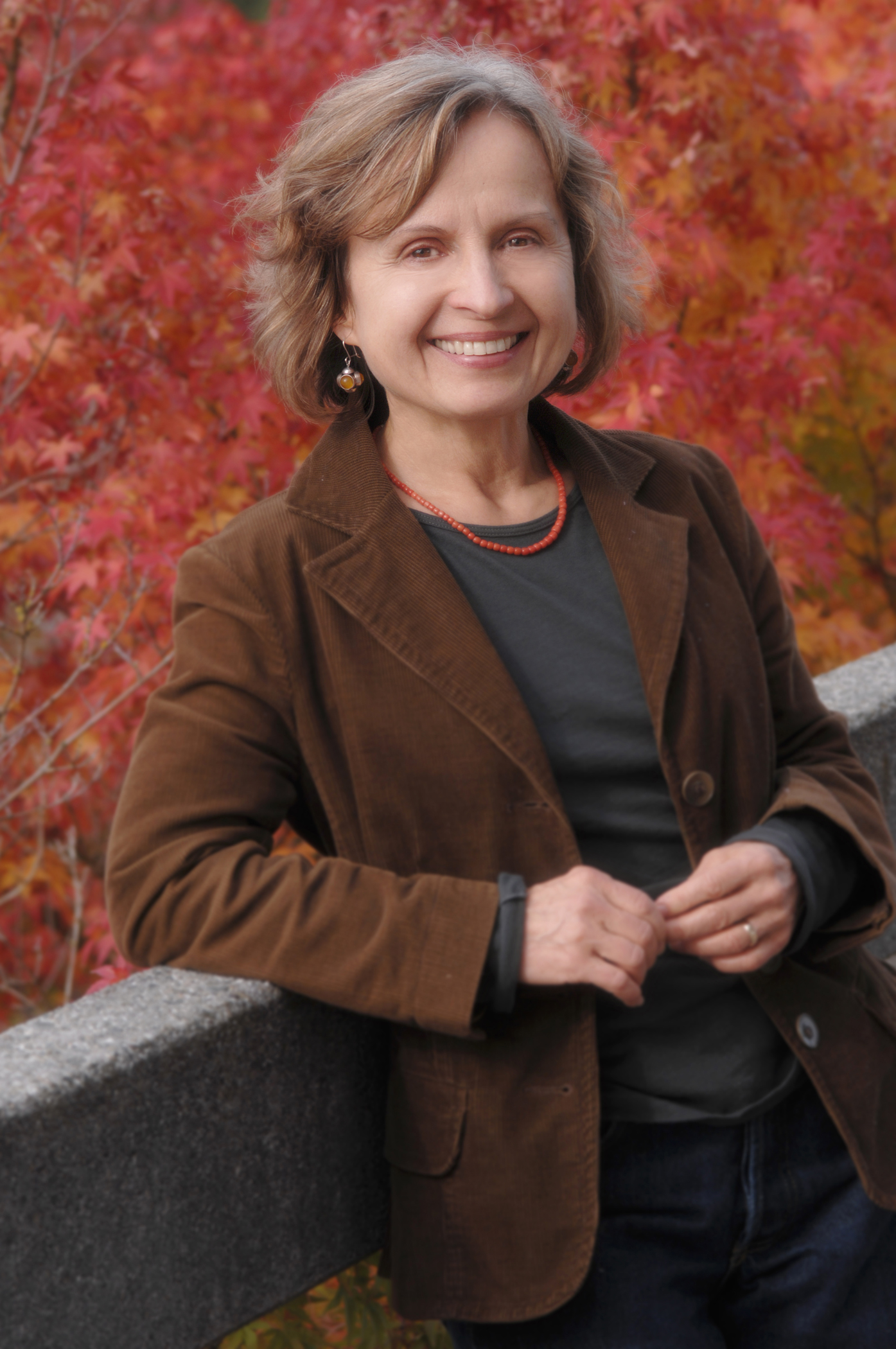
Dubiel in 2007

Malgorzata Dubiel is a Polish mathematician and mathematics educator who works as a senior lecturer at Simon Fraser University in Vancouver, Canada.

== Education and career ==
Dubiel is the daughter of a Polish military rocket scientist and engineer. She has a Ph.D. from the University of Warsaw, supervised by theoretical computer scientist and mathematical logician Victor W. Marek. In 1982, she moved to Canada.

At Simon Fraser, her courses include classes for future mathematics teachers, and remedial mathematics classes for students who did poorly in high school mathematics. She was president of the Simon Fraser University Faculty Association for two terms from 1994 to 1996, and again from 2004 to 2005.

== Outreach ==
Dubiel is known for her studies of Canadian primary and secondary school mathematics textbooks, and for pointing out problems in these texts caused in part because they were written by education professionals without consulting any mathematicians. Although she values creativity imagination in mathematics, and uses it in her own lessons, she has also stated that it "must not come at the expense of basic math skills, clear instructions and practice".

She has also served as president of the Canadian Math Education Study Group and co-chair in 2009 of the Canadian Mathematics Education Forum. She is the founder of an annual mathematics workshop for female graduate students in mathematics, Connecting Women in Mathematics Across Canada. She organizes the annual Changing the Culture conference for mathematics teachers at the Pacific Institute for the Mathematical Sciences, and is the creator of a series of exhibits and activities about mathematics in British Columbia shopping centers. She also leads multiple programs for high school mathematics.

== Recognition ==
Dubiel became a 3M Canadian National Fellow for Teaching and Learning in Higher Education in 2008. The award citation noted her exceptional ability to instill mathematical confidence in entering students, her creative use of cartoons and fairy-tale stories to foster students' mathematical imagination, and her work publicizing mathematics and numeracy to the public. She was the 2011 recipient of the Adrien Pouliot Award of the Canadian Mathematical Society for her contributions to mathematics education in Canada. She also won a 2011 YWCA Women of Distinction award. In 2018 the Canadian Mathematical Society listed her in their inaugural class of fellows.
