= Kseniya Garaschuk =

Canadian mathematician

Kseniya Garaschuk (born 1982) is a Belarusian Canadian mathematician and mathematics educator. She is an associate professor of mathematics and statistics at the University of the Fraser Valley, and the editor-in-chief of the mathematics journal Crux Mathematicorum.

== Education and career ==
Garaschuk was born to a family of mathematicians in Minsk, Belarus. She began studying mathematics and computer science at the Belarusian State University but after a year, when she was 18, moved with her parents to Canada. She took a gap year to improve her English and then completed her undergraduate studies at Simon Fraser University, staying at Simon Fraser for an additional year to earn a master's degree for work in exponential sums in 2008.

Next, she went to the University of Victoria for doctoral research in mathematics, in combinatorial design theory. She completed her PhD in 2014; her dissertation, Linear methods for rational triangle decompositions, was supervised by Peter Dukes. Finding herself isolated in her research work and more energized by teaching, Garaschuk took a postdoctoral fellowship in science education at the University of British Columbia, under the university's Carl Weiman Science Education Initiative, before joining the faculty at the University of the Fraser Valley, in 2016. Her current research interests include examining effectiveness of various classroom and assessment practices in undergraduate mathematics.

As well as her editorial work with Crux Mathematicorum, Garaschuk has been active in service to the Canadian Mathematical Society (CMS) since 2008, as student committee chair, a member of the board of directors, in running mathematics camps and community mathematics events. She is a member of the CMS Education Committee and is a contributing editor of the CMS Education Notes.

== Book ==
With Andy Liu, Garaschuk is coauthor of the book Grade Five Competition from the Leningrad Mathematical Olympiad, 1979–1992 (Springer, 2020).

== Recognition ==
In 2021, the Canadian Mathematical Society gave Garaschuk their Graham Wright Award for Distinguished Service, and named her as a fellow of the society.

In 2018, Garaschuk won University of the Fraser Valley Faculty of Science Teaching Award. In 2020, she was awarded University of the Fraser Valley Faculty of Science Achievement Award for overall excellence in academic endeavours.
