= Murray S. Klamkin =

American mathematician (1921–2004)

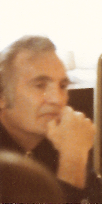
- Murray S. Klamkin, circa 1977
- Born: March 5, 1921
- Died: August 6, 2004 (aged 83)
- Education: Polytechnic University of New York
- Scientific career
- Fields: Mathematics
- Workplaces: SUNY Buffalo; University of Waterloo; University of Alberta

Murray Seymour Klamkin (March 5, 1921 – August 6, 2004) was an American mathematician, known as prolific proposer and editor of professionally-challenging mathematical problems.

== Life ==
Klamkin was born on March 5, 1921, in Brooklyn, New York. He received a bachelor's degree from the Cooper Union in 1942 and, after four years of service in the United States Army, earned a master's degree from the Polytechnic Institute of Brooklyn in 1947, where he taught from 1948 until 1957.

After this, Klamkin worked at AVCO, taught at SUNY Buffalo (1962–1964), and served as the principal research scientist at Ford Motor Company (1965–1976). During this period, he was also a visiting professor at the University of Minnesota. After leaving Ford, he became a professor at the University of Waterloo. From 1976 to 1981 Klamkin was the chairman of the Department of Mathematics at the University of Alberta.

After 1981 he became an emeritus professor at Alberta. Klamkin died August 6, 2004.

== Mathematical problems ==
Klamkin was known worldwide as a prolific proposer and editor of professionally challenging mathematical problems. He served as problem editor for SIAM Review, the American Mathematical Monthly, Math Horizons, and other journals. He was also known for his work in high-level mathematics competitions, such as the USA Mathematical Olympiad, the International Mathematical Olympiad, and the Putnam Competition. In 1988 the Mathematical Association of America gave him its Award for Distinguished Service to Mathematics, its highest service award. In 1992, the World Federation of National Mathematics Competitions awarded Klamkin the David Hilbert Award for his contributions to mathematics competitions.

== Selected bibliography ==
- "The asymmetric propeller", Leon Bankoff, Paul Erdös, and Murray S. Klamkin, Mathematics Magazine 46, #5 (November 1973), pp. 270–272.
- International Mathematical Olympiads, 1978–1985 and Forty Supplementary Problems, ed. Murray S. Klamkin, pub. Washington, DC: Mathematical Association of America, 1986. ISBN 0-88385-631-X.
- Mathematical Modelling: Classroom Notes in Applied Mathematics, ed. Murray S. Klamkin, pub. Philadelphia, PA: Society for Industrial and Applied Mathematics, 1987. ISBN 0-89871-204-1.
- U.S.A. Mathematical Olympiads, 1972–1986, ed. Murray S. Klamkin, pub. Washington, DC: Mathematical Association of America, 1988. ISBN 0-88385-634-4.
- Problems in Applied Mathematics: Selections from SIAM Review, ed. Murray S. Klamkin, pub. Philadelphia, PA: Society for Industrial and Applied Mathematics, 1990. ISBN 0-89871-259-9.
- Five Hundred Mathematical Challenges, Edward J. Barbeau, Murray S. Klamkin, and William O. J. Moser, pub. Washington, DC: Mathematical Association of America, 1995. ISBN 0-88385-519-4.
- Liu, Andy; Shawyer, Bruce, eds. (2008). Problems from Murray Klamkin. Washington: Mathematical Association of America. ISBN 978-0-88385-828-8. A collection of problems posed by Klamkin in Crux Mathematicorum with Mathematical Mayhem.
- On cooking a roast, Murray S. Klamkin. SIAM Review 3.2 (1961): 167–169.

== See also ==
- List of University of Waterloo people
