= Susan Milner =

Canadian mathematics educator

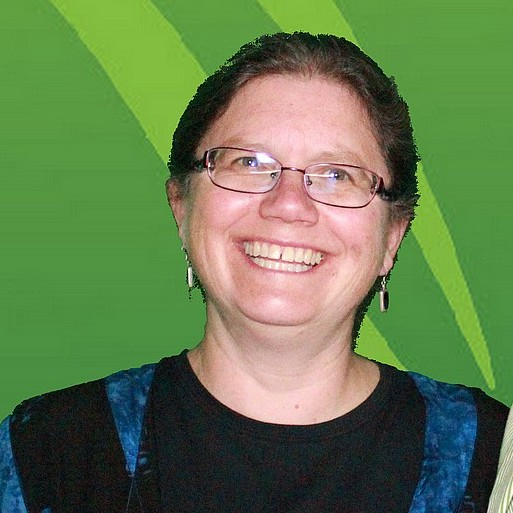
Milner at a 2012 awards ceremony at the University of the Fraser Valley

Susan F. Milner is a retired Canadian mathematics educator known for her work encouraging public appreciation of mathematics through secondary school outreach programs and contests, programs for the public, and publications on recreational mathematics and mathematical puzzles and games. She is a professor emerita of mathematics and statistics at the University of the Fraser Valley.

== Education and career ==
Milner has a B.A. in classics and philosophy and a B.S. in mathematics from Bishop's University in Quebec. She earned a master's degree from McMaster University, in 1986, with a master's thesis concerning logic and topos theory supervised by Bernhard Banaschewski.

After her master's degree, she began teaching at Okanagan College in British Columbia, initially planning to remain there only for a year before returning to graduate study. Instead she continued teaching mathematics in BC for 29 years, three at Okanagan and 26 at the University of the Fraser Valley. She retired in 2015 as a professor emerita at the University of the Fraser Valley.

Beyond her campus, Milner also headed the BC Committee on Undergraduate Programs in Mathematics and Statistics from 2002 to 2008.

== Outreach activities ==
Milner's interest in recreational mathematics began with the creation of puzzle handouts for students who finished the required work in her university courses early.

She ran a secondary-school mathematics contest at the University of the Fraser Valley for 11 years, and she and a team of student volunteers have led "Math Mania" activities at dozens of secondary schools in the Fraser Valley. She has also brought puzzle and game workshops to both primary and secondary schools through the Science World Scientists & Innovators in the Schools program.

== Recognition ==
Milner was the 2014 recipient of the PIMS Education Prize of the Pacific Institute for the Mathematical Sciences.
