= F. Michael Christ =

American mathematician

Francis Michael Christ
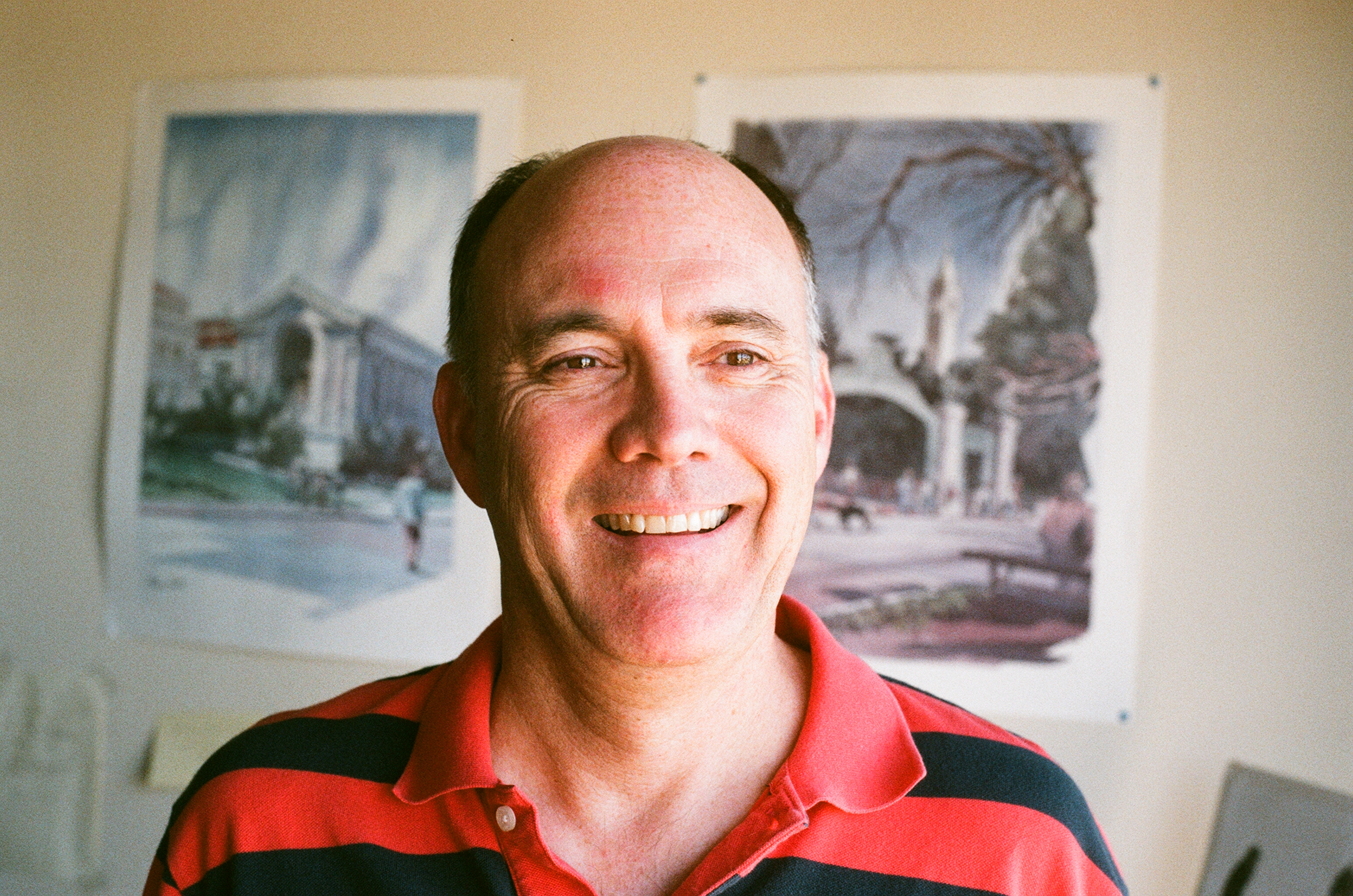
- F. Michael Christ in 2011
- Born: June 7, 1955 (age 71)
- Scientific career
- Fields: Mathematics
- Workplaces: University of California, Berkeley
- Doctoral students: Loukas Grafakos; Malabika Pramanik; Betsy Stovall

Francis Michael Christ (born 7 June 1955) is an American mathematician and professor at University of California, Berkeley, specializing in harmonic analysis, partial differential equations, and several complex variables. He is known for the Christ–Kiselev maximal inequality.

== Biography ==
He received in 1977 from Harvey Mudd College his bachelor's degree and in 1982 from the University of Chicago his PhD under the supervision of Alberto Calderón with thesis Restrictions of the Fourier transform to submanifolds of low codimension. At Princeton University, Christ worked with Elias M. Stein from 1982 to 1984 as an instructor and from 1984 to 1986 as an assistant professor. He was at the University of California, Los Angeles (UCLA) from 1986 to 1988 an associate professor and from 1988 to 1996 a full professor. In 1996, he became a full professor at the University of California, Berkeley.

Christ was a Sloan Fellow for the academic year 1986–1987. He was an invited speaker of the International Congress of Mathematicians in 1990 in Kyoto and in 1998 in Berlin. In 1997 he shared with David E. Barrett the Stefan Bergman Prize. He was named to the 2021 class of fellows of the American Mathematical Society "for contributions to harmonic and complex analysis, and linear partial differential equations".

== Selected publications ==
=== Articles ===
- 1987: (with Jean-Lin Journé) "Polynomial growth estimates for multilinear singular integral operators", Acta Mathematica 159(1–2): 51–80.
- 1990: "A T(b) theorem with remarks on analytic capacity and the Cauchy integral", Colloquium Mathematicum 60/61(2): 601–628.
- 1991: (with M. I. Weinstein) "Dispersion of small amplitude solutions of the generalized Korteweg-de Vries equation", Journal of Functional Analysis 100(1): 87–109. doi:10.1016/0022-1236(91)90103-C
- 2001: (with Alexander Kiselev) "Maximal functions associated to filtrations", Journal of Functional Analysis 179(2): 409–425.
- 2003: (with James Colliander & Terence Tao) "Asymptotics, frequency modulation, and low regularity ill-posedness for canonical defocusing equations", American Journal of Mathematics 125(6): 1235–1293 doi:10.1353/ajm.2003.0040

=== Books ===
- 1991: Lectures on singular integral operators. Regional Conference Series in Mathematics, 77. American Mathematical Society. ISBN 9780821807286.
