= Banff International Research Station =

Research institute in Alberta, Canada

Banff International Research Station for Mathematical Innovation and Discovery
- BIRS
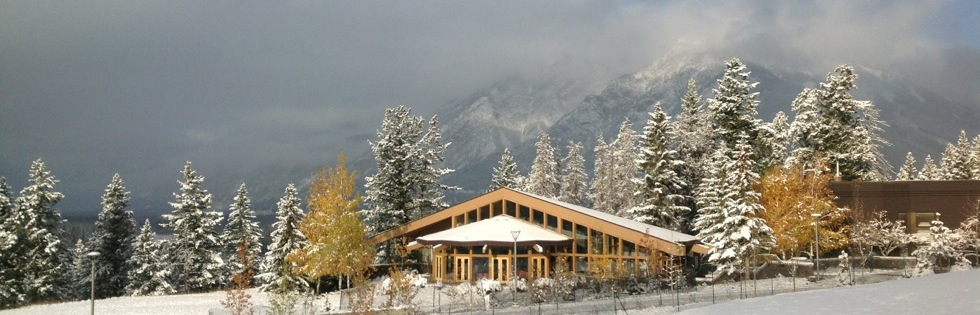
- Banff International Research Station
- Type: science, mathematics, & research institute
- Established: 2003
- Affiliations: University of British Columbia, Pacific Institute for the Mathematical Sciences, MITACS, MPrime, SL-Math
- Director: Malabika Pramanik
- Location: Banff, Alberta, Canada; 51.1724°N 115.5636°W
- Campus: The Banff Centre in Banff National Park
- Website: www.birs.ca

The Banff International Research Station (BIRS) for Mathematical Innovation and Discovery was established in 2003. It provides an independent research institute for the mathematical sciences in North America, a counterpart to the Oberwolfach Research Institute for Mathematics in Europe. The research station, commonly known by its acronym, "BIRS", hosts over 2000 international scientists each year to undertake research collaboration in the mathematical sciences.

== Research activities ==
The research that takes place at the Banff International Research Station is either in pure mathematics, applied mathematics, or in other areas of science where they intersect with mathematics, such as Statistics, Data Science, AI & Machine Learning, Computer Science and Math Biology.

"BIRS embraces all aspects of the mathematical, computational and statistical sciences from the most fundamental challenges of pure and applied mathematics, theoretical and applied computer science, statistics, and mathematical physics, to financial and industrial mathematics, as well as the mathematics of information technology, and the life sciences."

There is a wide range of research publications citing lectures, meetings and reports from BIRS.

== Research program ==
The Banff International Research Station hosts eight types of meetings:

1. 5-Day Workshops: These make up the core program at BIRS, with up to 42 participants per workshop, 48 weeks per year. Some workshops have only 21 participants, and they share a week at BIRS, running concurrently.
2. 2-Day Workshops: Weekend workshops, typically consisting of 25 people, and typically from the surrounding areas in Alberta and British Columbia.
3. Focused Research Groups: Up to 8 people from different institutions meet for 1–2 weeks, to work on a specific problem or finish up major projects.
4. Research in Teams: 2–4 people from different institutions meet for 1–2 weeks.
5. Summer Schools and Training Camps: instructional meetings for up to 40 students for up to 14 days.
6. Hybrid Thematic Programs:5-month-long hybrid thematic program format introduced following the pandemic, designed for active research areas spanning several related fields. Programs combine ongoing virtual collaboration with up to 2 in-person events at Banff, 5 days each.
7. BIRS Now!: A rapid-response format held exclusively in Banff, Alberta, intended to address timely and urgent developments in the mathematical sciences. Events may highlight recent breakthroughs, open problems with new momentum, or challenges at the intersection of mathematics, technology, and society.
8. PIMS/BIRS Team Up!: A collaborative program supporting small teams of mathematical scientists seeking in-person research time, with particular focus on researchers whose work has been disrupted by caregiving responsibilities, professional isolation, limited funding, or the effects of the COVID-19 pandemic.

The core program of 5-day workshops is created two years in advance. Every summer, BIRS issues a Call for Proposals, soliciting applications for workshops from the global scientific community. Each year, it gets more competitive to get a space in the 48 available weeks at BIRS: 79 proposals were received for the 2003 program, and 164 were received for the 2026 program. An extensive peer-review process by international experts culminates in the selection of the scientific program for a given year.

Summer schools and training camps must apply through the same process as 5-day workshops. An example of a summer school is the International Mathematical Olympiad (IMO) training camp, to prepare high school students for competing at the IMO. The other types of meetings are far less competitive, and may be applied for at any time, through the BIRS website.

== Affiliated Sites ==
IASM: The Institute for Advanced Study in Mathematics (IASM) is a mathematical research institute based in Hangzhou, China, inaugurated in December 2017. It joined BIRS as a partner in 2022 and hosts up to 10 BIRS-affiliated workshops annually, covering a broad range of topics across the mathematical sciences.

CMO: Casa Matemática Oaxaca (CMO) is an international mathematical research centre located in Oaxaca, Mexico, a city designated as a UNESCO World Heritage Site. CMO joined BIRS as a partner in 2014 and hosts up to 15 BIRS-affiliated workshops each year, spanning a wide range of topics in the mathematical sciences.

CMI: The Chennai Mathematical Institute (CMI) is a research and education institution based in Chennai, India, and serves as the first South Asian partner site of BIRS. CMI joined BIRS as a partner in 2022, hosting workshops across mathematics, computer science, and physics, with up to 10 BIRS-affiliated workshops held annually.

IMAG: The Instituto de Matemáticas at the University of Granada (IMAG) is a mathematical research institute located in Granada, Spain. IMAG joined BIRS as a partner in 2021 and hosts 5 five-day research workshops per year as part of the BIRS scientific program.

== Meeting facilities ==
The Banff International Research Station uses the TransCanada PipeLines Pavilion on the campus of the Banff Centre in Banff National Park. The TransCanada PipeLines Pavilion hosts administrative offices, two lecture rooms, and a series of smaller rooms for break-out sessions and research teams. As part of the Banff Centre campus, BIRS researchers have full access to all of its amenities and services.

The idea behind this choice of location for a research facility is to create an atmosphere where scientists can remove themselves from day-to-day life, and immerse themselves in their research.

== Automated lecture capture ==
In 2012, the Banff International Research Station installed a fully automated lecture capture system. It provides live video streaming and video recording of the lectures that take place in its main lecture room. Video recordings are automatically posted on the BIRS website within a few minutes after a lecture ends. Use of the system is opt-in, decided by the individual lecturers at the time of their lecture, via a touchscreen panel in the lecture room. The automated system at BIRS employs high quality cameras to ensure that mathematics written on chalkboards can be seen clearly. Embedded microphones and audio processing systems capture both the lecturer and questions from the audience.

Recent research videos recorded at BIRS are also available in the BIRS Videos.

== Funding ==
The Banff International Research Station is funded by the following governments.

Current sponsors:

1. The federal government of Canada, through the Natural Sciences and Engineering Research Council (NSERC)
2. The provincial government of Alberta, through Alberta Science and Research Authority (ASRA)

In addition to the above, past governmental sponsors have included:

1. The U.S. National Science Foundation (NSF)
2. Mexico's National Science and Technology Council, (CONACYT)

== See also ==
- BIRS Founding Director (2001), Nassif Ghoussoub
- BIRS Scientific Director (2001-2003), Robert Moody
- BIRS Scientific Director (2004-2020), Nassif Ghoussoub
- BIRS Scientific Director (2020-present), Malabika Pramanik
- The Banff Centre
- Banff, Alberta
- Pacific Institute for the Mathematical Sciences
- Mathematical Sciences Research Institute
- Comments from BIRS researchers
