= Loukas Grafakos =

Greek mathematician

- Born: July 20, 1962 (age 64); Athens Greece
- Education: University of California Los Angeles
- Known for: Fourier Analysis
- Title: Professor at University of Missouri

Loukas Grafakos (Greek: Λουκάς Γραφάκος) is a Greek mathematician working in harmonic analysis. He earned his Ph.D. from the University of California, Los Angeles, in 1989, under the guidance of Michael Christ. Grafakos is a Curators Distinguished Professor and holds the Mahala and Rose Houchins Distinguished Chair at the University of Missouri.

Grafakos' research interests include Fourier analysis, singular integrals, and Calderón–Zygmund theory. He is well known for his contributions to the area of multilinear harmonic analysis. Grafakos has been supported by the National Science Foundation and was a Simons Fellow in Mathematics during the academic year 2022-2023.

His monographs, “Classical Fourier Analysis”, “Modern Fourier Analysis”, and “Fundamentals of Fourier Analysis”, are widely used as references and as textbooks and provide comprehensive treatment of the subject.

He was elected as a Fellow of the American Mathematical Society, in the 2025 class of fellows.
