= Christ–Kiselev maximal inequality =

In mathematics, the Christ–Kiselev maximal inequality is a maximal inequality for filtrations, named for mathematicians Michael Christ and Alexander Kiselev.

== Continuous filtrations ==
A continuous filtration of $(M,\mu)$ is a family of measurable sets $\{A_\alpha\}_{\alpha\in\mathbb{R}}$ such that

1. $A_\alpha\nearrow M$, $\bigcap_{\alpha\in\mathbb{R}}A_\alpha=\emptyset$, and $\mu(A_\beta\setminus A_\alpha)<\infty$ for all $\beta>\alpha$ (stratific)
2. $\lim_{\varepsilon\to0^+}\mu(A_{\alpha+\varepsilon}\setminus A_\alpha)=\lim_{\varepsilon\to0^+}\mu(A_\alpha\setminus A_{\alpha+\varepsilon})=0$ (continuity)

For example, $\mathbb{R}=M$ with measure $\mu$ that has no pure points and

$$A_\alpha:=\begin{cases}\{|x|\le\alpha\},&\alpha>0, \\ \emptyset,&\alpha\le0. \end{cases}$$

is a continuous filtration.

== Continuum version ==
Let $1\le p<q\le\infty$ and suppose $T:L^p(M,\mu)\to L^q(N,\nu)$ is a bounded linear operator for $\sigma-$finite $(M,\mu),(N,\nu)$. Define the Christ–Kiselev maximal function

$T^*f:=\sup_\alpha|T(f\chi_\alpha)|,$

where $\chi_\alpha:=\chi_{A_\alpha}$. Then $T^*:L^p(M,\mu)\to L^q(N,\nu)$ is a bounded operator, and

$\|T^*f\|_q\le2^{-(p^{-1}-q^{-1})}(1-2^{-(p^{-1}-q^{-1})})^{-1}\|T\|\|f\|_p.$

== Discrete version ==
Let $1\le p<q\le\infty$, and suppose $W:\ell^p(\mathbb{Z})\to L^q(N,\nu)$ is a bounded linear operator for $\sigma-$finite $(M,\mu),(N,\nu)$. Define, for $a\in\ell^p(\mathbb{Z})$,

$$(\chi_n a):=\begin{cases}a_k,&|k|\le n\\0,&\text{otherwise}.\end{cases}$$

and $\sup_{n\in\mathbb{Z}^{\ge0}}|W(\chi_na)|=:W^*(a)$. Then $W^*:\ell^p(\mathbb{Z})\to L^q(N,\nu)$ is a bounded operator.

Here,
$$A_\alpha=\begin{cases}[-\alpha,\alpha],&\alpha>0\\\emptyset,&\alpha\le0\end{cases}$$.

The discrete version can be proved from the continuum version through constructing $T:L^p(\mathbb{R},dx)\to L^q(N,\nu)$.

== Applications ==
The Christ–Kiselev maximal inequality has applications to the Fourier transform and convergence of Fourier series, as well as to the study of Schrödinger operators.
