= Malabika Pramanik =

Canadian mathematician

- Education: Indian Statistical Institute, University of California, Berkeley
- Awards: Ruth I. Michler Memorial Prize; Krieger–Nelson Prize
- Scientific career
- Fields: Mathematics
- Workplaces: University of British Columbia
- Thesis: Weighted Integrals in $\mathbb{R}^2$ and the Maximal Conjugated Calderon–Zygmund Operator (2001)
- Doctoral advisor: F. Michael Christ

Malabika Pramanik is a Canadian mathematician who works as a professor of mathematics at the University of British Columbia. Her interests include harmonic analysis, complex variables, and partial differential equations.

== Education and career ==
Pramanik studied statistics at the Indian Statistical Institute, earning a bachelor's degree in 1993 and a master's in 1995. She then moved to the University of California, Berkeley, where she completed a doctorate in mathematics in 2001. Her dissertation, Weighted Integrals in $\mathbb{R}^2$ and the Maximal Conjugated Calderon–Zygmund Operator, was supervised by F. Michael Christ. After short-term positions at the University of Wisconsin, University of Rochester, and California Institute of Technology, she joined the UBC faculty in 2006. She was appointed director of the Banff International Research Station in 2020. In 2025, she was elected vice president of the American Mathematical Society.

== Recognition ==
Pramanik is the 2015–2016 winner of the Ruth I. Michler Memorial Prize of the Association for Women in Mathematics, and the 2016 winner of the Krieger–Nelson Prize, given annually by the Canadian Mathematical Society to an outstanding female researcher in mathematics. In 2018 the Canadian Mathematical Society listed her in their inaugural class of fellows. She was named a Fellow of the American Mathematical Society, in the 2022 "for contributions to complex and harmonic analysis and mentoring and support for the participation of under-represented groups in mathematics". Pramanik was an invited speaker at the International Congress of Mathematicians in 2022.
