= Opération Nez rouge =

Opération Nez rouge (literally, "Operation Red Nose"), founded in 1984, is an escorting service offered in Quebec and several francophone countries, including Switzerland, as well as other places in Canada using both the French name and Operation Red Nose during the Christmas holiday season.

== Description ==
The escorting service is offered to anyone who does not feel capable of driving due to alcohol consumption, fatigue, or any reason. Although it is a free service, donations are accepted.

Each year during the holiday season, an advertising campaign reminds the public to use the service if necessary.

When needing a ride, the client first calls the organization. The client must have his/her own car—it is not a taxi service. An escort team of three volunteers arrives. One volunteer, the 'escort driver', uses his or her own car to drive the other two volunteers to the client's location. The 'designated driver' volunteer then drives the client home in the client's own car. The third volunteer is the 'navigator', and drives with the designated driver and client, collecting any donation that the client should want to make, giving the client a receipt, and making conversation with the client so the client does not bother the driver. When the ride is over, the escort driver picks up the designated driver and the navigator.

Originally donations went to the swimming team of Université Laval, but the organization became so successful that today donations go to 150 organizations. The costs of Operation Nez Rouge are covered by sponsors (such as insurance companies.)

== History ==
Operation Nez Rouge was started in 1984 in Quebec City by Jean-Marie De Koninck, who had two goals. He wanted to finance Université Laval's swimming team and he wanted to do something to fight driving under the influence. He knew that drivers leaving bars refused taxis to bring them home when intoxicated, not because of the cost, but because they wanted to have their own cars the next day. Thus came the idea to simply offer an escorting service.

In Quebec, The service was used 1,205,894 times between 1984 and 2004.

Dr Jean-Luc Baierlé, impressed by the Quebec idea, brought the concept to Switzerland and organized the first Operation Red Nose in Jura, in collaboration with the Jura League against drug addiction. In 2020, the only regions in Switzerland that are not served are Basel, Engadin and Upper Valais. In 2021, the total number of people transported since 1990 is 493,000.

The service was the setting of the 2003 romantic comedy film Red Nose (Nez rouge).
