= Walter Whiteley =

- Title: Professor
- Awards: Adrien Pouliot Award

Academic background
- Education: Queen's University; Massachusetts Institute of Technology
- Doctoral advisor: Gian-Carlo Rota

Academic work
- Discipline: Mathematician
- Sub-discipline: Geometry
- Institutions: Champlain College Saint-Lambert; York University

Walter John Whiteley is a professor in the department of mathematics and statistics at York University in Canada. He specializes in geometry and mathematics education, and is known for his expertise in structural rigidity and rigidity matroids.

== Education and career ==
Whiteley graduated from Queen's University in 1966. He earned his Ph.D. in 1971 from the Massachusetts Institute of Technology, with a dissertation titled Logic and Invariant Theory supervised by Gian-Carlo Rota. He worked as an instructor at Champlain College Saint-Lambert, with a joint appointment in mathematics and humanities, from 1972 until he joined the York University faculty in 1992.

== Awards and honours ==
In 2009, Whiteley won the Adrien Pouliot Award of the Canadian Mathematical Society for his contributions to mathematics education. In August 2014, the Fields Institute at the University of Toronto hosted a workshop on rigidity theory and spatial reasoning, "inspired by the distinguished career of Professor Walter Whiteley".

== Selected publications ==
- Roth, B.; Whiteley, W. (1981), "Tensegrity frameworks", Transactions of the American Mathematical Society, 265 (2): 419–446, doi:10.2307/1999743, JSTOR 1999743, MR 0610958.
- Connelly, Robert; Whiteley, Walter (1996), "Second-order rigidity and prestress stability for tensegrity frameworks", SIAM Journal on Discrete Mathematics, 9 (3): 453–491, doi:10.1137/S0895480192229236, MR 1402190.
- Whiteley, Walter (1996), "Some matroids from discrete applied geometry", Matroid theory (Seattle, WA, 1995), Contemporary Mathematics, vol. 197, Providence, RI: American Mathematical Society, pp. 171–311, doi:10.1090/conm/197/02540, ISBN 978-0-8218-0508-4, MR 1411692.
- Whiteley, Walter (1997), "Rigidity and scene analysis", Handbook of discrete and computational geometry, CRC Press Ser. Discrete Math. Appl., CRC, Boca Raton, FL, pp. 893–916, MR 1730205.
- Eren, T.; Goldenberg, O.K.; Whiteley, W.; Yang, Y.R.; Morse, A.S.; Anderson, B.D.O.; Belhumeur, P.N. (2004), "Rigidity, computation, and randomization in network localization", Proceedings of the Twenty-Third Annual Joint Conference of the IEEE Computer and Communications Societies (IEEE INFOCOM 2004), Vol. IV, vol. 4, pp. 2673–2684, doi:10.1109/infcom.2004.1354686, ISBN 0-7803-8355-9, S2CID 5674760.
- Aspnes, J.; Eren, T.; Goldenberg, D.K.; Morse, A.S.; Whiteley, W.; Yang, Y.R.; Anderson, B.D.O.; Belhumeur, P.N. (2006), "A theory of network localization", IEEE Transactions on Mobile Computing, 5 (12): 1663–1678, Bibcode:2006ITMC....5.1663A, doi:10.1109/tmc.2006.174, S2CID 2911118.
- Connelly, Robert; Weiss, Asia Ivić; Whiteley, Walter, eds. (2014). Rigidity and Symmetry. New York: Springer. ISBN 9781493907809. OCLC 941174259.
