= Jean-Marie De Koninck =

Canadian mathematician

- Born: April 29, 1948; Quebec City
- Father: Charles De Koninck
- Relatives: Rodolphe De Koninck; Joseph De Koninck; Thomas De Koninck; Maria De Koninck
- Website: www.jeanmariedekoninck.mat.ulaval.ca

Jean-Marie De Koninck, OC CQ (born 1948) is a Canadian mathematician. He has served as a professor at Université Laval since 1972 and is the creator of the road safety program Opération Nez Rouge, or "Red Nose Operation", a system preventing people from drinking and driving.

== Biography ==
He is the son of the philosopher and theologian Charles De Koninck and the brother of the geographer Rodolphe De Koninck, the psychologist Joseph De Koninck, the philosopher Thomas De Koninck and the sociologist Maria De Koninck.

Birthdate:

- April 29, 1948, Quebec City.

Occupation:

- Professor of Mathematics at Université Laval

University diplomas:

- 1970: Baccalauréat ès Sciences, Université Laval
- 1972" Master's degree in mathematics, Temple University
- 1973: Ph.D. in mathematics, Temple University

Professional career at Université Laval:

- 1972–1977: assistant professor at the Mathematics Department
- 1976–1980: assistant director at the Mathematics Department and person responsible of graduated studies
- 1977–1982: associate professor at the Mathematics Department
- 1982–present: professor at the Mathematics and Statistics Department
- 1988–2002: person responsible of the collaboration between Université Laval and colleges
- 1999–2003: assistant director at the Mathematics and Statistics Department and director of programs for the 2nd and 3rd cycles in mathematics and statistics
- 2005–present: director of SMAC (Science and Mathematics in Action) program

== Scientific realizations ==
Author of nine books:

- Topics in Arithmetical Functions, North-Holland, 1980
- Approche élémentaire de l'étude des fonctions arithmétiques, Les Presses de l'Université Laval, 1982
- Introduction à la théorie des nombres, Modulo, Montréal, 1994
- 1001 problèmes en théorie classique des nombres (with Armel Mercier), Ellipses, Paris, 2004
- Mathématiques de l'ingénieur, Éditions Loze, Montréal, 2004
- 1001 Problems in Classical Number Theory (with Armel Mercier), American Mathematical Society, 2007 (English edition of 1001 problèmes en théorie classique des nombres)
- Ces nombres qui nous fascinent, Ellipses, Paris, 2008
- En chair et en maths, Septembre Éditeur, Québec, 2008
- Those Fascinating Numbers, American Mathematical Society, 2009 (English edition of Ces nombres qui nous fascinent)

Author of 83 publications in scientific papers with reviewing committees.

Author of the SMAC chronicle in the Découvrir revue (five publications per year).

Guest speaker in several Canadian and American universities, as well as in France, Germany, Hungary, Yugoslavia and Mexico.

Co-president of the organizing committee of the International Conference on Number Theory held in Université Laval from July 5 to July 18, 1987.

Co-president of the organizing committee of the 33rd Seminar of Mathematical Sciences of Quebec held in Université Laval on April 21, 1990.

Member of the FQRNT's Board of Directors from 2001 to 2008.

President of the 70th ACFAS Congress held in Université Laval from May 13 to May 17, 2002.

Research Director of four PhD students and 12 Masters students.

President of the Association mathématique du Québec from 2005 to 2007.

Member of the ACFAS' Board of Directors from 2005 to 2007.

De Koninck is an analytic number theorist. He has worked on the distribution of prime numbers, factorization methods, the asymptotic behavior of arithmetic functions, and the Riemann zeta function. He is the author of more than 50 peer-reviewed research papers.

=== Contributions to the dissemination and popularization of mathematics ===
- Research and animation of a Canadian television series C'est mathématique! ("It's mathematical!") broadcast on Z Network and produced by Téléfiction. The first series (16 episodes of 30 minutes) was broadcast during winter of 2000 and the second series (13 episodes of one hour) during winter of 2001. Both series were bought by the TFO Network (Télévision française de l'Ontario/Ontario French Television) in 2001: since then, they are on air each fall. They are broadcast as well on Canal Savoir. The goal pursued by C'est mathématique! is to demonstrate to a general audience that mathematics are present in almost all areas of human activity, and somehow in our everyday lives. It deals with the presence of mathematics in finance, meteorology, medical treatments, aviation, lotteries, sports, message encoding (cryptography), food, etc.
- Organizer of "Popular Lectures on current mathematics" (given on three consecutive days in April 1999, 2000, 2001 and 2002): This is a series of presentations by students graduating in mathematics and intended for students and professors from colleges and universities.
- Organizer, during the summers of 1991, 1992 and 1993, of the AMQ (Association mathématique du Québec/Quebec Mathematics Association) Mathematics Camp, an annual summer event bringing together the 25 best mathematics students from colleges.
- Organizer of La Quinzaine des Sciences held in October 1996 at Université Laval: a series of popular lectures on sciences intended for a general audience.
- Guest speaker in several colleges of Quebec, as part of lectures organized by the ISM (Institut des sciences mathématiques du Québec/Mathematics Sciences Institute of Quebec) since year 2000. Lectures were given in the following colleges: CEGEP Ste-Foy, CEGEP F.X. Garneau, CEGEP d'Ahuntsic, CEGEP Édouard Montpetit, Collège Brébeuf and CEGEP of Chibougamau (with videoconference).
- Guest speaker invited by the Association française pour l'enseignement des mathématiques en Ontario (French Association for Mathematics Education in Ontario) on November 16, 2000. The lecture title was "Des équations et des hommes" ("Of Equations and Men"), in which the speaker was demonstrating that behind most of the important mathematical discoveries, we can find passionate and profoundly human persons.
- Guest speaker at the Congress "Des mathématiques pour le monde (Mathematics for the people)" organized in May 2000 by a gathering of all organizations involved in mathematics education at all levels.
- Invited by the GRMS (Groupe de recherche sur les mathématiques au secondaire/research group on high school mathematics) to pronounce the opening lecture of the May 2002 Congress.
- Invited by the Canadian Mathematical Society to pronounce the general audience lecture at the June 2002 Congress.
- Invited by the Canadian Mathematical Society, at the Canadian Forum on Mathematics Education, to pronounce the general audience lecture, on May 16, 2003.
- On a regular basis since 1990, he gives interviews on mathematics-related subjects on several television networks (Radio-Canada, TVA, TQS and many other community stations) and various radio stations.

== Community involvement ==
- President and founder of Operation Red Nose, an operation of road safety held in Canada in December of each year since 1984, bringing the participation of over 45 000 volunteers annually. Operation Red Nose has provided over one million rides since its foundation and gives more than 1 million Canadian dollars to amateur sports organizations in donations every year.
- Honorary president of several fundraisers (Mira Foundation, many Red Cross blood campaigns, Adaptavie, Laval Hospital, Ste-Monique Hospital, the Ignatia House, the Camp-School Trois-Saumons, the "Association des Diplômés de l'Université Laval" (Alumni Association of Université Laval), and the Fernand Séguin School Foundation)
- President of the "Table québécoise de la sécurité routière" since December 2005

=== Involvement in amateur sport ===
1974-1985: president of the Quebec Swimming Coaches Association

1978-1990: coach of the Rouge et Or swimming club of Université Laval

1976–present: sports analyst for the Société Radio-Canada for international swimming competitions, among others the Summer Olympic Games of 1976, 1984, 1988, 1992, 1996, 2000, 2004 and 2008

1988-1995: president of the Club des Amis de la Natation du Québec (Quebec Friends of Swimming Club)

1988-1998: member of the board of directors of the Quebec Swimming Federation; author of Systeme 2001 (1992), a software that allows swimming coaches to prepare their training plans and monitor the evolution of their athletes physiologically throughout the season

1999–present: president of the Rouge et Or swimming club of Université Laval

2005-2007: member of the board of directors of Swimming Canada

2005–present: president of the board of directors of the Coaching Association of Canada

== Honours ==
1975: named Coach of the Year in the province of Quebec by the Société des Sports du Québec

1979: named Varsity Swimming Coach of the Year in Canada

1984: named Coach of the Year in the Quebec area

1985: awarded the Solicitor General of Quebec Award for "its support for crime prevention in the region 03 by the completion of the Operation Red Nose"

1985: motion of congratulations at the House of Commons for the initiative of the Operation Red Nose

1987: the National Assembly declared Friday, December 18 the national day of Operation Red Nose and officially congratulates Jean-Marie De Koninck for his initiative of Operation Red Nose

1988: awarded, as president and founder of Operation Red Nose, the Alphonse-Desjardins Award, underlying his positive action in the community

1988: La Presse newspaper's personality of the week

1989: named "volunteer administrator" of the Year by the Quebec Society for Sports in Quebec for his help in the development of amateur sport

1989: Operation Red Nose was awarded with the Jury Special Award in Carcassonne (France), at the Film Festival on Road Safety

1990: guest speaker at the First International Congress on road safety (Edmonton, Alberta)

1990: named "Sports Personality of the Year" in the Quebec area

1990: as president and founder of the Operation Red Nose, Jean-Marie De Koninck was awarded with the Solicitor General of Quebec Award in "recognition of his outstanding contribution to crime prevention in Canada"

1992: named in the Quebec Swimming Hall of Fame

1994: Audace Award, Fidéides Gala, for his exceptional realizations and his contribution to the influence of the region of Quebec

1994: Member of the Order of Canada - promoted to Officer in 2014

1995: awarded the Adrien-Pouliot Award from the Mathematical Association of Quebec for the book Introduction à la théorie des nombres

1996: named "Personality Richelieu International"

1998: awarded with the 50th Anniversary Medal by the Association des diplômés de l'Université Laval

1999: Knight of the National Order of Quebec

2001: special mention at the annual awards of the Mathematical Association of Quebec for the popular article "Those Fascinating Numbers"

2002: awarded the Abel-Gauthier award, presented annually by the Mathematical Association of Quebec to the "Quebec Mathematical Personality"

2003: honored at the National Assembly for his contribution to the road safety in Quebec

2004: awarded the Adrien Pouliot Award by the Canadian Mathematical Society for his "continuing and significant contributions to mathematics education in Canada

2005: honorary president of IMAGINE, the Innovation happening in the Quebec area

2006: named as a member of the "Académie des Grands Québécois" by the Chambre de Commerce et de l'Industrie du Québec

2006: recognized as Scientist of the Year by Radio-Canada for "his exemplary role in the promotion and development of mathematics in Canada"

2006: awarded the Lester B. Pearson award, given every year by CIS (Canadian Interuniversity Sport) for his "contribution to the development of university sport in Canada
