= Adrien Pouliot =

Canadian mathematician and educator

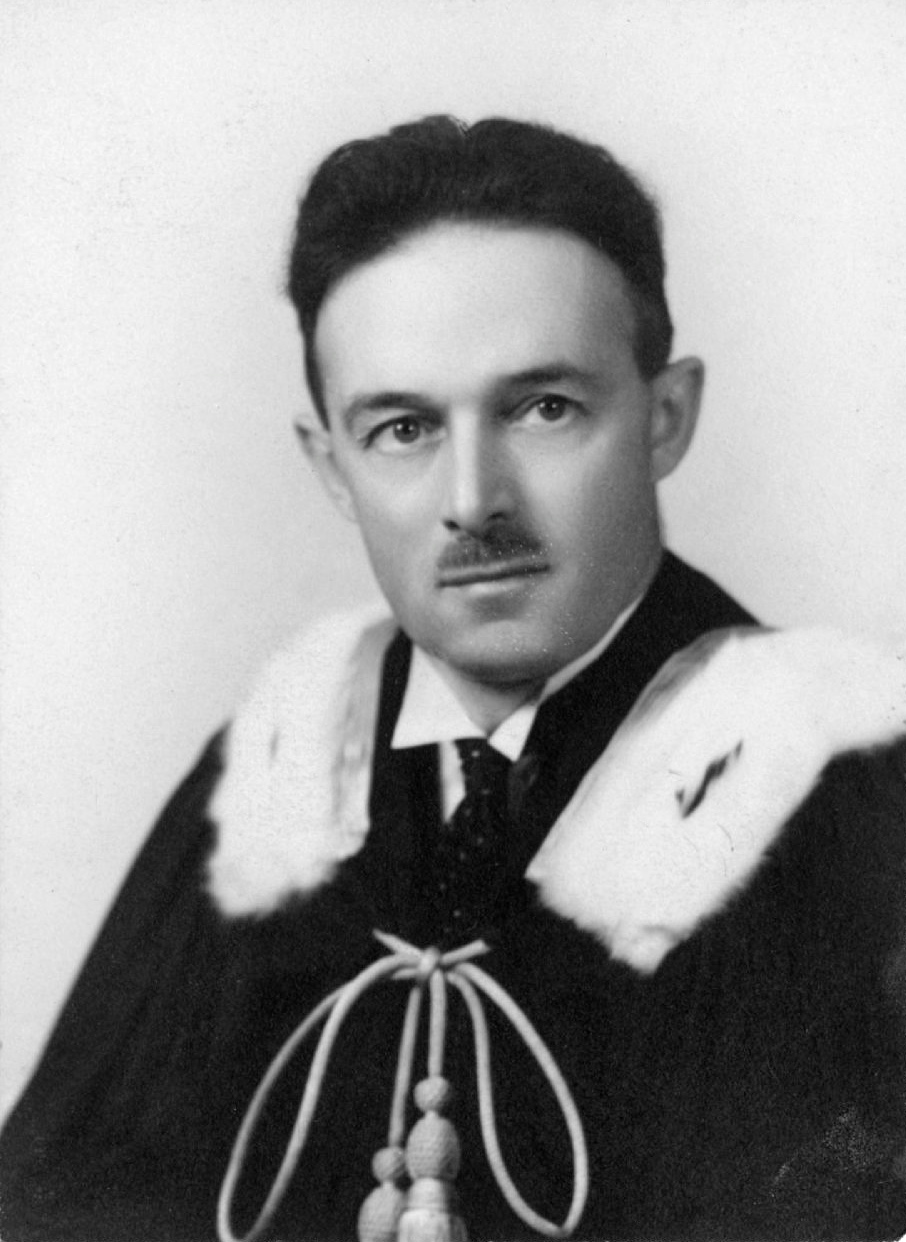
- Pouliot c. 1930
- Born: January 4, 1896; Île d'Orléans, Quebec
- Died: March 10, 1980 (aged 84); Quebec City, Quebec
- Awards: Order of Canada
- Scientific career
- Fields: Mathematics

Adrien Pouliot, CC (January 4, 1896 – March 10, 1980) was a Canadian mathematician and educator.

Born in Île d'Orléans, Quebec. He married Laure Clark and was cousin of André Hudon. He obtained a B.A. in applied sciences from the École Polytechnique de Montréal in 1919. He helped to create the department of mathematics at Université Laval where he began teaching in 1922. He was president of the Canadian Mathematical Society from 1949 to 1953. He was made a Companion of the Order of Canada in 1972. He was head of the Faculty of Science at Laval from 1940 to 1956. A building on the Laval campus has been named in his honour.

The Canadian Mathematical Society's Adrien Pouliot Award is named in his honour.
