= Adrien Pouliot Award =

Canadian Mathematical Society award

The Adrien Pouliot Award is presented annually by the Canadian Mathematical Society. The award is presented to individuals or teams in recognition of significant contributions to mathematics education in Canada. The inaugural award was presented in 1995. Persons and teams that are nominated for the award will have their applications considered for a period of three years. The award is named in honor of Canadian mathematician Adrien Pouliot. It should be distinguished with a different but similarly-named award, the Adrien Pouliot Prize of the Mathematical Association of Québec.

== Recipients of the Adrien Pouliot Award ==
Source: Canadian Mathematical Society

- 2026 Jamie Mulholland
- 2025 Barbara Forrest and Brian Forrest
- 2024 André Boileau
- 2023 Edward Doolittle
- 2022 John Mighton
- 2021 Joseph Khoury
- 2020 Veselin Jungić
- 2019 Tiina Hohn
- 2018 Centre for Education in Mathematics and Computing (CEMC)
- 2017 Richard Hoshino
- 2016 Donald Violette
- 2015 Mark Mac Lean
- 2014 Frédéric Gourdeau
- 2013 John Grant McLoughlin
- 2012 Melania Alvarez
- 2011 Malgorzata Dubiel
- 2010 Miroslav Lovric
- 2009 Walter Whiteley
- 2008 J. Harley Weston
- 2007 Richard Nowakowski
- 2006 Peter Taylor
- 2005 Katherine Heinrich
- 2004 Jean-Marie De Koninck
- 2003 Andy Liu
- 2002 Not Awarded
- 2001 George Bluman
- 2000 Bernard Courteau
- 1999 Eric Muller
- 1998 Bernard R. Hodgson
- 1997 Ronald Scoins
- 1997 Ronald Dunkley
- 1997 Donald Attridge
- 1997 Ed Anderson
- 1996 Bruce Shawyer
- 1995 Edward J. Barbeau

== See also ==
- List of mathematics awards
