= María Falk de Losada =

American-born Colombian mathematician

- Born: United States
- Education: Manhattanville College (B.S. 1964); Harvard University (M.S. 1965); University of Illinois at Chicago (Ph.D. 1970)
- Known for: Developing mathematics competitions in Colombia
- Children: Marta Losada Falk
- Awards: David Hilbert Award (1994); José Celestino Mutis Prize (2011); Juan Montalvo Prize (2017)
- Scientific career
- Fields: Mathematics
- Institutions: National University of Colombia; Antonio Nariño University
- Thesis: (1970)

Mary Elizabeth (María) Falk de Losada is an American-born Colombian mathematician. She is a retired professor of mathematics at the National University of Colombia, and a former rector of Antonio Nariño University., She is known for her work developing mathematics competitions in Colombia.

She should be distinguished from her daughter Marta Losada Falk, a Colombian physicist who succeeded her as president of Antonio Nariño University.

== Education and career ==
Falk was born in the US. She graduated from Manhattanville College in suburban New York State in 1964, and earned a master's degree from Harvard University in 1965. She completed her doctorate in mathematics at the University of Illinois at Chicago in 1970.

She worked at the National University of Colombia from 1966 until retiring in 1995. She was a member of the senior board of Antonio Nariño University beginning in 1988, and served as its rector from 2001 to 2010.

== Competitions ==
Beginning in 1981, Falk pushed the development of the Colombian Mathematical Olympiad, a local offshoot of the International Mathematical Olympiad that she cofounded.

She was chair of the jury for the 54th International Mathematical Olympiad, held in Santa Marta, Colombia. At the Olympiad, her daughter María Elizabeth Losada served on the organizing committee, and her 12-year-old granddaughter Isabella Mijares worked as a microphone runner.

She is also a cofounder and the former president of the World Federation of National Mathematics Competitions, and has written several books of mathematics problems and books for mathematics teachers.

== Recognition ==
In recognition of her work on mathematics competitions, Falk won the David Hilbert Award of the World Federation of National Mathematics Competitions in 1994. She was Howard Lyons Lecturer in the Canadian Mathematics Competition Seminar at the University of Waterloo in Canada in 2000. In 2011 the Colombian Mathematical Society gave her their José Celestino Mutis Prize, and 2017 the Ecuadorian Mathematical Olympiad gave her their Juan Montalvo Prize.
