= Andy Liu =

Canadian mathematician (born 1947)

- Born: 15 March 1947; Guangzhou, China
- Died: 26 March 2024 (aged 77); Edmonton, Alberta, Canada
- Education: University of Alberta
- Scientific career
- Fields: Mathematics
- Workplaces: University of Alberta
- Doctoral advisor: Harvey Leslie Abbott

Andrew Chiang-Fung Liu (Chinese: 劉江楓, March 15, 1947—March 26, 2024) was a Canadian mathematician. For many years, he was a professor in the Department of Mathematical and Statistical Sciences at the University of Alberta in Edmonton.

Liu was born in Guangzhou, and attended New Method College in Hong Kong. He then did his undergraduate studies in mathematics at McGill University, and earned his Ph.D. in 1976 from the University of Alberta, under the supervision of Harvey Abbott, with the dissertation Some Results on Hypergraphs. He also received a professional diploma in education alongside his doctorate.

He was the leader of the Canadian team to the International Mathematical Olympiad in 2000 (South Korea) and 2003 (Japan) and the deputy leader of the United States of America team from 1981 to 1984, and acted as vice-president of the Tournament of Towns.

== Books ==
- 1998 Chinese Mathematics Competitions and Olympiads Book 1 (1981-1993), Australian Mathematics Trust
- 2001 Hungarian Problem Book III (1929–1943), Mathematical Association of America
- 2005 Chinese Mathematics Competitions and Olympiads Book 2 (1993-2001), Australian Mathematics Trust
- 2008 The Alberta High School Math Competitions (1957–2006), Mathematical Association of America
- 2009 Problems from Murray Klamkin, Mathematical Association of America, with Bruce Shawyer
- 2009 International Mathematics Tournament of the Towns Book (2002-2007), Australian Mathematics Trust, with Peter Taylor
- 2011 Hungarian Problem Book IV (1947–1963), Mathematical Association of America, with Robert Barrington-Leigh
- 2014 Upper Elementary School Mathematics, Chiu Chang Mathematics Publishers, Taipei
- 2014 Classical Geometry, Wiley, with Ed Leonard, Ted Lewis and George Tokarsky
- 2015 Arithmetical Wonderland, Mathematical Association of America
- 2016 Soviet Union Mathematical Olympiad (1961–1992), Mathematical Association of America
- 2018 Chinese Mathematics Competitions and Olympiads Book 3 (2001-2009), Australian Mathematics Trust, with Yunhao Fu and Zhichao Li
- 2018 S.M.A.R.T. Circle Overview, Springer Nature
- 2018 S.M.A.R.T. Circle Projects, Springer Nature
- 2018 S.M.A.R.T. Circle Minicourses, Springer Nature
- 2020 The Puzzles of Nobuyuki Yoshigahara, Springer Nature, with George Sicherman and Takayuki Yoshigahara
- 2020 Grade Five Competition from the Leningrad Mathematical Olympiad, Springer Nature, with Kseniya Garaschuk
- 2021 Solomon Golomb’s Course in Undergraduate Combinatorics, Springer Nature, with Solomon Golomb
- 2023 Mathematical Puzzle Tales from Mount Olympus, AK Peters / CRC

== Awards ==
- Pacific Institute for the Mathematical Sciences Educational Prize, (2010)
- One of the Deborah and Franklin Haimo Awards for Distinguished College or University Teaching of Mathematics from the Mathematical Association of America (2004)
- Adrien Pouliot Award from the Canadian Mathematical Society (2003)
- Distinguished Teaching Award from the Pacific Northwest Section of the Mathematical Association of America (2002)
- Canadian University Professor of the Year, Canadian Council for the Advancement of Education and Council for Advancement and Support of Education (1998)
- Distinguished Educators Award, Ontario Institute for Studies in Education (1998)
- David Hilbert Award, World Federation of National Mathematics Competitions (1996)
