= Nassif Ghoussoub =

Canadian mathematician

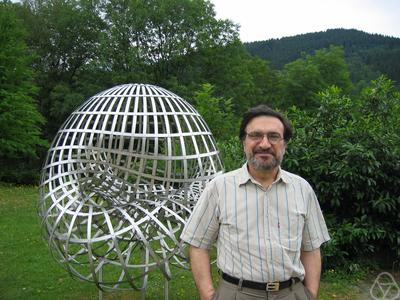
- Ghoussoub in Oberwolfach 2005
- Born: 9 November 1953 (age 72); Segou
- Education: Paris VI University
- Scientific career
- Fields: Mathematics
- Workplaces: University of British Columbia
- Doctoral advisor: Gustave Choquet; Antoine Brunel

Nassif A. Ghoussoub OC FRSC is a Canadian mathematician working in the fields of non-linear analysis and partial differential equations. He is a Professor of Mathematics and a Distinguished University Scholar at the University of British Columbia.

== Early life and education ==
Ghoussoub was born to Lebanese parents in Western Africa (now Mali).

He completed his doctorat 3ème cycle (PhD) in 1975, and a Doctorat d'Etat in 1979 at the Pierre and Marie Curie University, where his advisors were Gustave Choquet and Antoine Brunel.

== Career ==
Ghoussoub completed his post-doctoral fellowship at the Ohio State University during 1976–77. He then joined the University of British Columbia, where he currently holds a position of Professor of Mathematics and a Distinguished University Scholar. Ghoussoub is known for his work in functional analysis, non-linear analysis, and partial differential equations.

He was vice-president of the Canadian Mathematical Society from 1994 to 1996, the founding director of the Pacific Institute for the Mathematical Sciences (PIMS) for the period 1996–2003, the co-editor-in-chief of the Canadian Journal of Mathematics during 1993–2002, a co-founder of the MITACS Network of Centres of Excellence, and is the founder and scientific director (2001 - 2020) of the Banff International Research Station (BIRS). In 1994, Ghoussoub became a fellow of the Royal Society of Canada, and in 2012, a fellow of the American Mathematical Society.

Ghoussoub has been awarded multiple awards and distinctions, including the Coxeter-James prize in 1990, and the Jeffrey-Williams prize in 2007. He holds honorary doctorates from the Université Paris-Dauphine (France), and the University of Victoria (Canada). He was awarded the Queen Elizabeth II Diamond Jubilee Medal in 2012, and appointed to the Order of Canada in 2015, with the grade of officer for contributions to mathematics, research, and education.

In 2018, Ghoussoub was elected a faculty representative on the University of British Columbia's Board of Governors. He will serve until February 29, 2020. Ghoussoub has previously served two consecutive terms in this role from 2008 to 2014.

Ghoussoub's scholarly work has been cited over 5,900 times and has an h-index of 40.

== Awards ==
- Coxeter-James Prize, Canadian Mathematical Society (1990)
- Killam Senior Research Fellowship, UBC (1992)
- Fellow of the Royal Society of Canada (1994)
- Distinguished University Scholar, UBC (2003)
- Doctorat Honoris Causa, Paris Dauphine University
- Jeffery–Williams Prize, Canadian mathematical Society (2007)
- Faculty of Science Achievement Award for outstanding service and leadership, UBC (2007)
- David Borwein Distinguished Career Award, Canadian Mathematical Society (2010)
- Fellow of the American Mathematical Society (2012)
- Queen Elizabeth II Diamond Jubilee Medal (2012)
- Honorary Doctor of Science-University of Victoria (June 2015)
- Officer of the Order of Canada (December 2015)
- Inaugural fellow of the Canadian Mathematical Society, 2018

== Bibliography ==
=== Selected Academic Publications ===
- Ghoussoub, N.; Preiss, D. (1989). "A general mountain pass principle for locating and classifying critical points". Annales de l'Institut Henri Poincaré C. 6 (5): 321–330. Bibcode:1989AIHPC...6..321G. doi:10.1016/s0294-1449(16)30313-4. ISSN 0294-1449. S2CID 53449063.
- Ghoussoub, N.; Gui, C. (1 July 1998). "On a conjecture of De Giorgi and some related problems". Mathematische Annalen. 311 (3): 481–491. doi:10.1007/s002080050196. ISSN 0025-5831. S2CID 120215307.
- Ghoussoub, N.; Yuan, C. (6 July 2000). "Multiple solutions for quasi-linear PDEs involving the critical Sobolev and Hardy exponents". Transactions of the American Mathematical Society. 352 (12): 5703–5743. doi:10.1090/s0002-9947-00-02560-5. ISSN 0002-9947.
- Ekeland, Ivar; Ghoussoub, Nassif (4 January 2002). "Selected new aspects of the calculus of variations in the large". Bulletin of the American Mathematical Society. 39 (2): 207–265. doi:10.1090/s0273-0979-02-00929-1. ISSN 0273-0979.
- Ghoussoub, Nassif; Guo, Yujin (2007). "On the Partial Differential Equations of Electrostatic MEMS Devices: Stationary Case". SIAM Journal on Mathematical Analysis. 38 (5): 1423–1449. arXiv:math/0509534. doi:10.1137/050647803. ISSN 0036-1410. S2CID 10221543.

=== Books ===
1. Ghoussoub, N.; Moradifam, Amir (2013). Functional inequalities : new perspectives and new applications. Providence, Rhode Island. ISBN 978-0-8218-9152-0. OCLC 823209440.
2. Ghoussoub, Nassif; Guo, Yujin (2010). Mathematical analysis of partial differential equations modeling electrostatic MEMS. Providence, R.I.: American Mathematical Society. ISBN 978-0-8218-4957-6. OCLC 466771715.
3. Ghoussoub, N. (2008). Self-dual partial differential systems and their variational principles. New York: Springer. ISBN 978-0-387-84896-9. OCLC 258078803.
4. Ghoussoub, N.; Cambridge University Press (1993). Duality and Perturbation Methods in Critical Point Theory. Cambridge: Cambridge University Press. ISBN 978-0-511-55170-3. OCLC 668203489.

== See also ==
- Banff International Research Station
