= Banff Centre for Arts and Creativity =

Arts centre in Alberta, Canada

Coordinates: 51.171843°N 115.561677°W

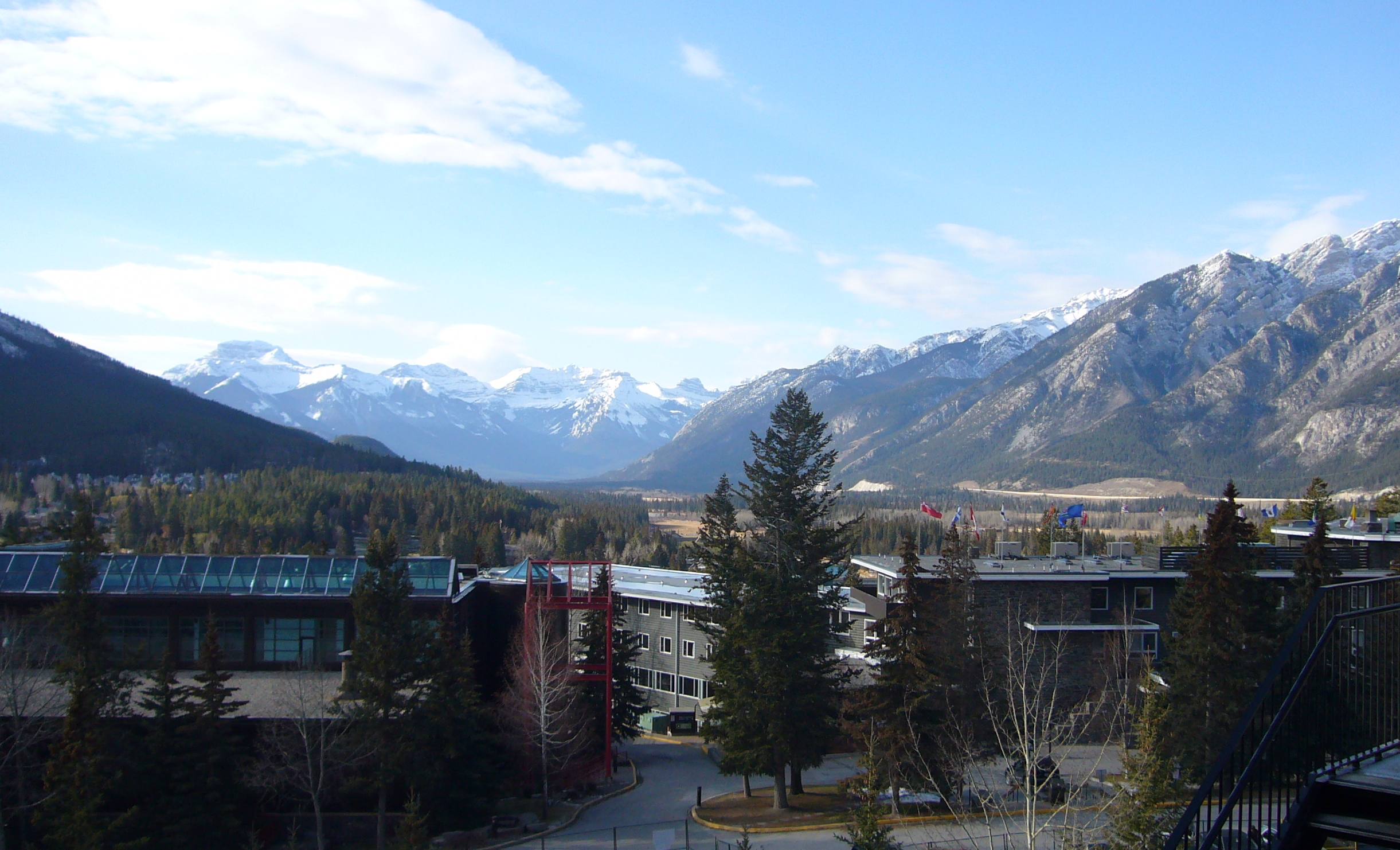
- Motto: Inspiring Creativity
- Type: Arts, cultural, and educational institution and conference complex
- Established: 1933; 93 years ago
- Academic affiliations: University of Calgary
- President: Chris Lorway
- Location: Banff, Alberta, Canada
- Campus: Tunnel Mountain in Banff National Park
- Website: banffcentre.ca

Banff Centre for Arts and Creativity (formerly Banff Centre) is an arts and culture educational institution in Banff, Alberta.

It offers arts programs in the performing and fine arts, as well as leadership training. It was established in 1933 as the Banff School of Drama. It was granted full autonomy as a non-degree granting post-secondary educational institution in 1978. Banff Centre is a member of the Alberta Rural Development Network.

On June 23, 2016, Banff Centre announced a new name: Banff Centre for Arts and Creativity.

== History ==
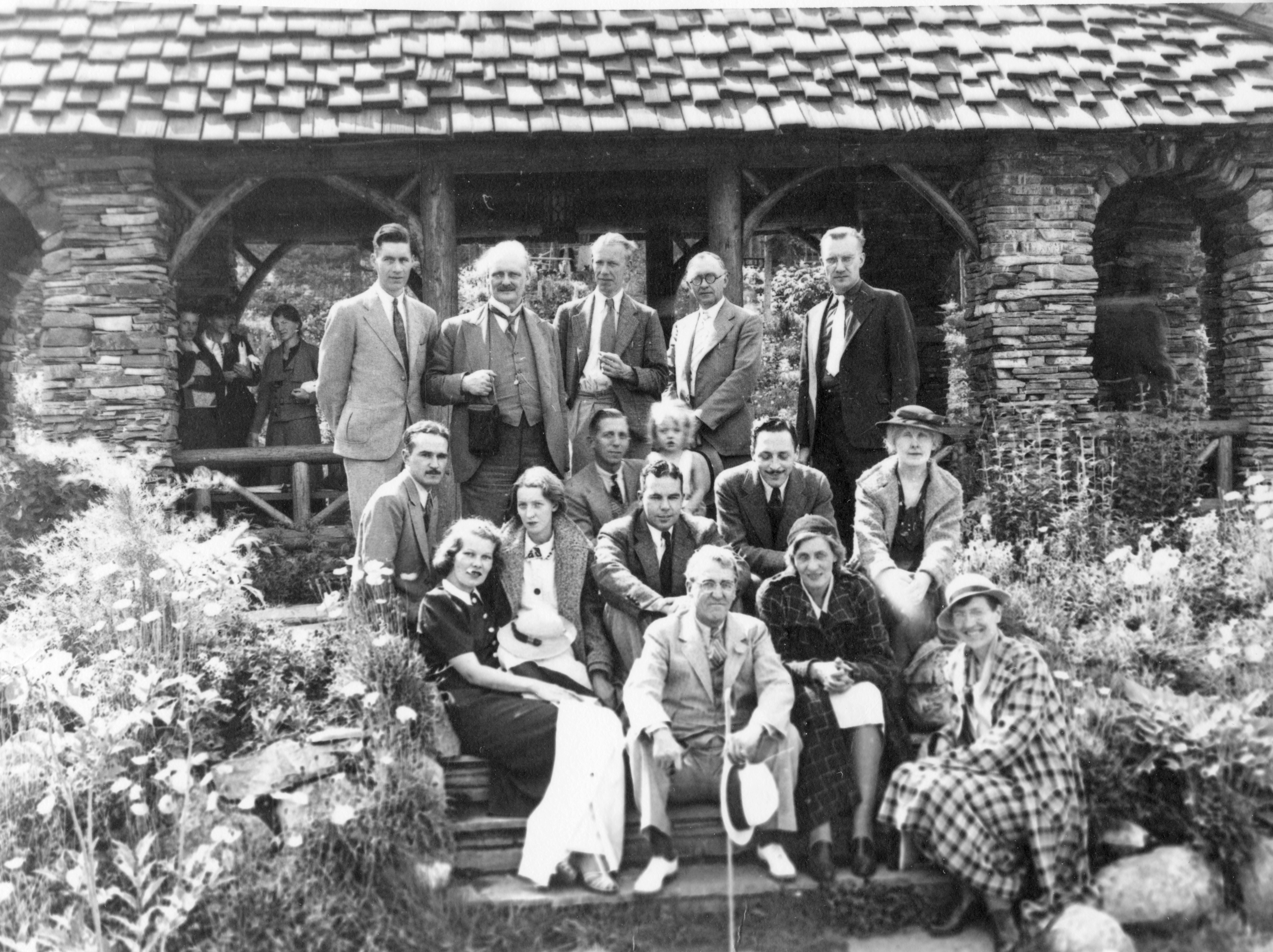
Group at Banff School of Fine Arts, August 1937. University of Alberta Archives, UAA-1969-097-200c

The centre was founded in 1933 by the University of Alberta, with a grant from the U.S.-based Carnegie Foundation. Elizabeth Sterling Haynes, Theodore and Eliot Cohen, Gwillym Edwards, and Gwen Pharis served as the centre's first employees, with Haynes and Cohen teaching approximately 230 students that first summer. Initially only a single course in drama was offered.

In 1934, the centre established its special children's drama division and hired instructors Wallace House, Roy Mitchell, and Jocelyn Taylor Mitchell. During the 1935 summer school, the students performed Relief by Minnie Bicknell.

In 1935, the centre became known as The Banff School of Fine Arts. The Carnegie grant that initially funded the centre was suspended from August to December 1935 to be assessed by the Carnegie Foundation. The grant was renewed for two years, though the foundation recommended the University of Alberta should assume financial responsibility at the end of that term.

As arts programming continued to succeed and develop, conferences were introduced in 1953 and management programs in 1954. The facility was renamed The Banff Centre for Continuing Education (The Banff Centre for short) in 1970. The centre was granted full autonomy as a non-degree granting educational institution under the governance of a board of directors by the province of Alberta in 1978.

The centre is now affiliated with the University of Calgary, which became its trustee and a significant student feeder in 1966.

In the mid-1990s, in response to a cut in its provincial operating grant, the centre launched a capital campaign (The Creative Edge). Proceeds were used to develop conference and arts facilities, which opened in 1996. The centre was designated as a National Training Institute by the federal government in 1999, and became home to the Banff International Research Station in 2003. The centre's name was officially changed to "The Banff Centre" in 2008, and to the "Banff Centre for Arts and Creativity" in 2016.

On June 11, 2020, the institution laid off 284 staff members via Zoom. The layoff subsequently sparked an open letter from several prominent artists, curators, arts figures, alumni and current and former staff expressing concern for the institution's commitment to values supporting its visual arts programming and operations.

== Programming ==
Programs include residencies, workshops, practicum programs, the Leighton Artists' Studios (an artist retreat opened by Prince Philip, Duke of Edinburgh, on 20 August 1985), and the multidisciplinary Banff Summer Arts Festival.

- Creative Residencies artist-in-residence programs
- Thematic residencies
- Banff Artist in Residence programs
- Film and media
- Visual arts
- Theatre arts
- Music and sound
- Literary arts
- Indigenous arts
- Leighton Artists' Studios
- Leadership development
- Dissemination

== Media ==
In 2013, the centre applied to the Canadian Radio-television and Telecommunications Commission to acquire two tourist information radio stations serving the area, CFPE-FM and CFPF-FM, from Friends of Banff National Park Fellowship, and to launch an additional new station, CJXB-FM. Under the Banff Centre's ownership, the existing stations would be expanded to incorporate some community radio talk and information programming, while the new CJXB would program an adult album alternative music format. The approval to acquire CFPE and CFPF from the Friends of Banff was granted on July 19, 2013, while the new station was approved on August 6, 2013.

The centre formally launched its new community radio programming on the existing stations in June 2014.

By 2015, however, CJXB had still not launched when the Banff Centre decided to discontinue all three radio stations in order to focus on a podcasting strategy. The CRTC revoked the CFPE and CFPF licenses on April 10, 2015.

== Facilities ==
Banff Centre for Arts and Creativity facilities offer resources to support artists of all disciplines. Facilities include a writers' lounge and the Library and Archives. The Leighton Artists' Studios has nine studio cottages.

The centre also operates the Walter Phillips Gallery, an art museum located within the Banff Centre. In addition to its arts programming, conferences were introduced in 1953 and management programs in 1954. Banff Centre hosts 500 conferences a year, with proceeds dedicated to supporting arts programming. In 2003, it became host to the Banff International Research Station for Mathematical Innovation and Discovery.

== Notable people ==
=== Alumni ===
- Valri Bromfield
- Claire and Antoinette Cann
- Shawn Everett
- Moira Walley-Beckett
- Ashan Pillai (violist)
- Richard Kelly Kemick (writer)
- Conrad Bain (Actor)
- Fiona Reid (Actor)
- Bruno Gerussi (Actor)
- John Vernon (Actor)
- Mary Knickle (Musical artist)

=== Staff ===
- Mary E. Hofstetter, president and CEO 1999-2011
