= Tom Brown (mathematician) =

American-Canadian mathematician

- Born: Thomas Craig Brown; 1938 (age 87–88); Portland, Oregon, U.S.
- Education: Reed College (BS); Washington University in St. Louis (Ph.D.)
- Known for: Brown's Lemma
- Scientific career
- Fields: Mathematics; Ramsey Theory
- Workplaces: Simon Fraser University
- Thesis: On Semigroups which are Unions of Periodic Groups (1964)
- Doctoral advisor: Earl Edwin Lazerson
- Doctoral students: Veselin Jungić

Thomas Craig Brown (born 1938) is an American-Canadian mathematician, Ramsey Theorist, and Professor Emeritus at Simon Fraser University.

== Collaborations ==
As a mathematician, Brown’s primary focus in his research is in the field of Ramsey Theory. When completing his Ph.D., his thesis was 'On Semigroups which are Unions of Periodic Groups' In 1963 as a graduate student, he showed that if the positive integers are finitely colored, then some color class is piece-wise syndetic.

In A Density Version of a Geometric Ramsey Theorem, he and Joe P. Buhler showed that “for every $\varepsilon > 0$ there is an $n(\varepsilon)$ such that if $n = dim(V) \geq n(\varepsilon)$ then any subset of $V$ with more than $\varepsilon|V|$ elements must contain 3 collinear points” where $V$ is an $n$-dimensional affine space over the field with $p^d$ elements, and $p \neq 2$".

In Descriptions of the characteristic sequence of an irrational, Brown discusses the following idea: Let $\alpha$ be a positive irrational real number. The characteristic sequence of $\alpha$ is $f(\alpha) = f_1 f_2 \ldots$; where $f_n = [ ( n+1 )\alpha] [\alpha]$.” From here he discusses “the various descriptions of the characteristic sequence of α which have appeared in the literature” and refines this description to “obtain a very simple derivation of an arithmetic expression for $[n\alpha]$.” He then gives some conclusions regarding the conditions for $[n\alpha]$ which are equivalent to $f_n = 1$.

He has collaborated with Paul Erdős, including Quasi-Progressions and Descending Waves and Quantitative Forms of a Theorem of Hilbert.
