= Marta Losada =

Colombian high energy physicist

Marta Losada Falk is a Colombian high energy physicist, a pioneer of physics in Colombia, and the president of Antonio Nariño University.

She should be distinguished from her mother, American-born Colombian mathematician María Falk de Losada, who was rector of Antonio Nariño University from 2001 to 2010.

== Education and career ==
Losada earned a bachelor's and master's degree in physics at the National University of Colombia, where her mother was a mathematics professor. She completed her Ph.D. at Rutgers University in the US, and was a postdoctoral researcher at CERN from 1997 to 1999. She has also studied in the Program on Science, Technology and Society at Harvard University's John F. Kennedy School of Government.

She has worked at Antonio Nariño University since 2000, initially as Director of the Basic and Applied Science Research Center and then as National Director for Research from 2004 to 2014. She became president of the university in 2010, replacing her mother as head of the university.

Losada holds the position of International Councilor on the board of directors of the American Physical Society.

== Physics in Colombia ==
Losada's undergraduate expertise in particle physics was largely self-taught, as the National University did not offer courses on the subject at the time. She did her master's thesis on solar neutrinos, "the first master’s thesis in particle physics" at the university.

She is one of the collaborators on the ATLAS experiment at the Large Hadron Collider. Through this work, she built a research group at her university and expanded the presence of high energy physics in Colombia.
