= Still Stands the House =

1938 play by Gwen Pharis Ringwood

Still stands the house
- Original language: English
- Written by: Gwen Pharis Ringwood
- Setting: Western Canada, 1930s

Premiere
- Date: March 1938

Still Stands the House is a 1938 play by Gwen Pharis Ringwood. It premiered on 3 March 1938 at the Carolina Playmakers School in North Carolina.

== Characters ==
- Manning
- Ruth Warren
- Hester Warren
- Bruce Warren

== Plot ==
Bruce agrees to sell the Warren farm to Mr. Manning, after his pregnant wife Ruth encourages him to do so. Bruce's sister Hester doesn't want to leave the family house, because of memories of her dead father. Ruth and Hester argue about it during which Bruce goes after a horse that escapes. Hester knowing that their lanterns won't stay lit for long enough to get back, sends Ruth after Bruce to the snowstorm where they both end up dying.
