= Arthur Engel (mathematician) =

German mathematician (1928–2022)

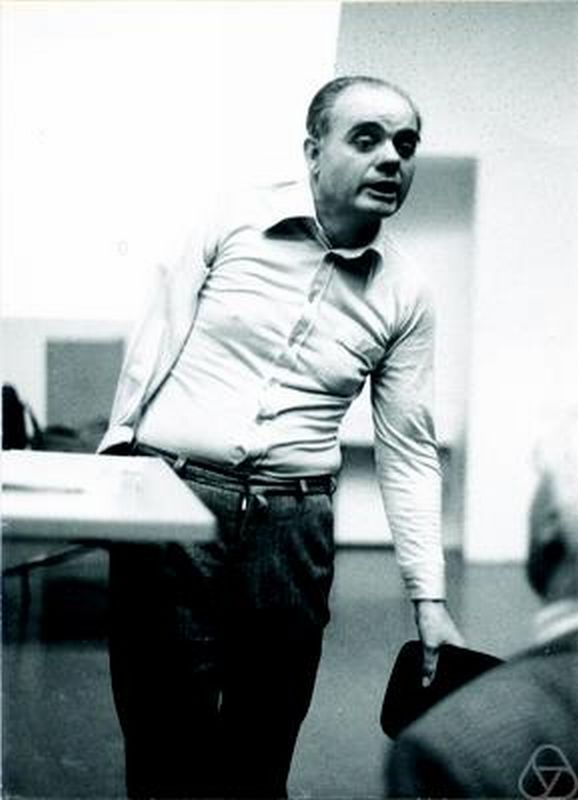
Engel in 1978

Arthur Engel (12 January 1928 – 11 November 2022) was a German mathematics teacher, educationalist and prolific author. His work has been translated into several languages. He had played a role in national and international mathematical competitions since 1970. Engel was one of the first to recognize the impact of electronic calculators and computers on mathematics teaching. He viewed that the focus should shift from learning how to apply algorithms, which could now be done by the machine, to learning how to build and test algorithms. He was also early to see the value of using computers to draw students into an interest and understanding of mathematics.

== Career ==
Arthur Engel was born in 1928. He graduated from the University of Stuttgart in 1952, and was a secondary school teacher for 18 years. In 1970 he became an associate professor at the Ludwigsburg University of Education, a teacher's training institution. Engel was a professor of the Institut für Didaktik der Mathematik und der Informatik (Institute for teaching mathematics and computer science) of Goethe University Frankfurt.

Engel began to push for establishment of the Bundeswettbewerb Mathematik (Federal Mathematics Competition) as early as 1965. The first competition was held in 1970. He was a leader of the first German team to participate in the International Mathematical Olympiad (IMO), held in Belgrade in 1977. He was the leader of the German IMO delegation until 1984. Engel, then at Frankfurt University, chaired the jury of the 30th IMO in Braunschweig, Lower Saxony (13–24 July 1989). An IMO sets six problems for the participants to solve. Two of the 1979 problems were proposed by Engel, and one in each of 1981, 1983, 1986 and 1987.

In 1990 Engel was awarded the Cross of the Order of Merit of the Federal Republic of Germany by the Minister of Education of West Germany. In 1991 he was among the first three recipients of the David Hilbert Award given by the World Federation of National Mathematics Competitions (WFNMC). The award was given for an article he published in 1987 in the WFNMC Journal "Mathematics Competitions" that discussed creating Mathematical Olympiad Problems, covering the different aspects of the subject in detail.

== Works ==
Engel was the author or co-author of numerous textbooks, teaching aids and books and articles on teaching mathematics written in German and English. Some have been translated into French, Spanish and Polish.

In his 1970 paper The Teaching of Probability in the Intermediate Grades, Engel described an activity in which students would first use a spinning device to generate a random series of numbers, then use devices to create a series where the spins were not independent, simulating a Markov process. An Australian teacher built on this to introduce students to a simple model of the weather. In his 1975 Wahrscheinlichkeitsrechnung und Statistik (Probability and Statistics) volume 2, Engel provided a chip-moving algorithm that could be used to determine the basic descriptive qualities of an absorbing Markov chain. The algorithm depended on recurrence of the initial distribution of chips, which Engel said had been proved by L. Scheller but not published. A proof was published in 2006 by J. Laurie Snell.

In his 1984 Elementary Mathematics from an Algorithmic Standpoint Engel had the insight that with computers and calculators widely available, students would no longer accept rote learning of algorithms that could be executed mechanically. He proposed that mathematics in schools should instead focus on the concept of the algorithm, and the syllabus should be completely revised to take an "algorithmic standpoint". His proposed approach would focus on construction and testing of algorithms rather than their execution.

Engel was one of the first to recognize the value of computer programming in teaching mathematics. Engel's 1993 Exploring Mathematics with Your Computer, draws from number theory, probability, statistics, combinatorics, numerical algorithms and many other fields. The book was primarily written for teachers. The book has been criticized for failing to provide motivation before discussing topics, called "a nice idea, not very well executed". However the book has also been called "a collection of gems ... a rich banquet." Another reviewer called this book "an excellent source of ideas for computer-based activities that engage students in mathematical explorations. A third reviewer said "Those who have met examples of Arthur Engel's work will know what to expect, and this is another example of his astonishing versatility."

Engel's 1998 Problem-Solving Strategies has been described as the "most complete training book available for secondary and collegiate mathematics contests ... Beautiful mathematics abounds..."

== Partial bibliography ==
- Engel, Arthur (May 1968). "Systematic Use of Applications in Mathematics Teaching". Educational Studies in Mathematics. 1 (1/2, Proceedings of the Colloquium "How to Teach Mathematics so as to Be Useful"): 202–221. doi:10.1007/bf00426244. JSTOR 3481993. S2CID 123643654.
- Engel, Arthur (December 1969). "The Relevance of Modern Fields of Applied Mathematics for Mathematical Education". Educational Studies in Mathematics. 2 (2/3, Addresses of the First International Congress on Mathematical Education): 257–269. doi:10.1007/bf00303462. JSTOR 3482080. S2CID 123481382.
- Engel, Arthur (1970). A short course in probability. Cemrel, Inc. p. 115.
- Engel, Arthur (1971). Mathematische Modelle der Wirklichkeit (Mathematical models of reality) (in German). Klett.
- Engel, Arthur (June 1971). "Geometrical Activities for the Upper Elementary SchoolQuick View". Educational Studies in Mathematics. 3 (3/4 Lectures of the Comprehensive School Mathematics Project (CSMP). Conference on the Teaching of Geometry): 353–394. doi:10.1007/BF00302303. JSTOR 3482033. S2CID 121409419.
- Engel, Arthur; Varga, Tamás; Walser, Willi (January 1974). Zufall oder Strategie?: Spiele zur Kombinatorik und Wahrscheinlichkeitsrechnung auf der Primarstufe (Elementary combinatory and probability games) (in German). Klett. p. 167. ISBN 978-3-12-902000-5.
- Engel, Arthur; Varga, Tamas; Walser, Willi; J.M. Dijkshoorn; D.J. Karman; Klaas Bernhard Koster (1975). Toeval of strategie. Wolters-Noordhoff. p. 49. ISBN 978-90-01-26467-3.
- Engel, Arthur (1975). L'enseignement des probabilites et de la statistique: Par arthur engel adapte de l'allemand par joel pinchinat et jacques ulrici (in French). Cedic. p. 306. ISBN 9782712401153.
- Engel, Arthur (March 1975). "The Probabilistic Abacus". Educational Studies in Mathematics. 6 (1): 1–22. doi:10.1007/bf00590021. JSTOR 3482156. S2CID 120059891.
- Engel, Arthur (1976). Mathematische Olympiadeaufgaben aus der UDSSR: mit ausführlichen Lösungen (in German). Klett. ISBN 9783127103007.
- Engel, Arthur; Varga, Tamás; Walser, Willi (1976). Hasard ou strategie ? (Chance or Strategy) (in French). O.C.D.L. p. 191. ISBN 978-2-7043-1924-4.
- Engel, Arthur (1977). Elementarmathematik vom algorithmischen Standpunkt (Elementary Mathematics from the algorithmic point of view) (in German). Klett. p. 222. ISBN 978-3-12-983340-7.
- Engel, Arthur; Varga, Tamás; Walser, Willi (1979). Strategia czy przypadek ?: gry kombinatoryczne i probabilistyczne (Strategy or coincidence?: Combinatorial and probabilistic games) (in Polish). WSiP. p. 169. ISBN 978-83-02-00578-7.
- Engel, Arthur (1979). Mathématique élémentaire d'un point de vue algorithmique (in French). CÉDIC. p. 319. ISBN 978-2-7124-0152-8.
- Engel, Arthur; Röhrl, Emanuel (1982). Neue Ideen in der Statistik: zum Gedenken an Prof. Emanuel Röhrl (New ideas in statistics: in memory of Prof. Emanuel Röhrl) (in German). p. 89. ISBN 978-3-12-963371-7.
- Engel, Arthur (1984). Elementary mathematics from an algorithmic standpoint. Keele Mathematical Education Publications. p. 264. ISBN 9780947747008.
- Engel, Arthur (1984). Wahrscheinlichkeitsrechnung und Statistik, 2 (Probability and Statistics, 2) (in German). Klett.
- Engel, Arthur; Meneu, Vicente; Morata, Magdalena (1988). Probabilidad y estadística (Probability and Statistics) (in Spanish). Mestral. p. 256. ISBN 978-84-7575-318-8.
- Engel, Arthur; Reisz, Daniel (1985). Mathématique et informatique (in French). Cedic/Nathan. p. 319. ISBN 978-2-7124-0177-1.
- Engel, Arthur (January 1987). Stochastik (Stochastics) (in German). Klett. p. 253. ISBN 978-3-12-983110-6.
- Engel, Arthur (1993). Exploring Mathematics with Your Computer. Washington, DC: Mathematical Association of America. p. 312. ISBN 978-0-88-3856-36-9.
- Engel, Arthur (1990). Les certitudes du hasard (Certainty of chance) (in French). Aleas. p. 330. ISBN 978-2-908016-04-8.
- Engel, Arthur (1991). Mathematisches Experimentieren mit dem PC (Mathematical experimentation with the PC) (in German). Klett Ernst /Schulbuch. p. 284. ISBN 978-3-12-983360-5.
- Engel, Arthur (1997). Problem-Solving Strategies. Springer. p. 403. ISBN 978-0-387-98219-9.
