= Graham Hilford Pollard =

Australian mathematician

- Education: Australian National University
- Awards: David Hilbert Award (1991)
- Scientific career
- Fields: Mathematics
- Thesis: A Stochastic Analysis of Scoring Systems (1976)

Graham Hilford Pollard is an Australian mathematician, professor, statistician, author, lecturer, and Doctor in Mathematics, recognised for being the recipient of the David Hilbert Award in 1991.

== Career ==
In 1976, he received his PhD from the Australian National University with the thesis entitled A Stochastic Analysis of Scoring Systems.

He is a lecturer in statistics at the Canberra College of Advance Education since 1982, and currently serves as chairman of the editorial committee of the Australian Mathematics Trust publishing house.

In 1991, he received the David Hilbert Award from the World Federation of National Mathematics Competitions.

Most of his papers have been published by the Australian & New Zealand Journal of Statistics, Journal of Mathematics Competitions, the Journal of Educational Studies in Mathematics, the Journal of the Australian Mathematical Society, and the International Journal of Mathematical Education in Science and Technology.

== Academic papers ==
- Pollard, Graham Hilford; Clark, D.I (1989). "An optimal scoring system for multiple choice competitions". Journal of Mathematics Competitions. 2 (2): 33–36.
- Graham H. Pollard (August 1987). "Two methods of reducing guessing in multiple choice examinations". Journal of Mathematics Competitions (6): 47–52.
- Pollard, Graham H. (1989). "Further scoring systems to remove guessing in multiple choice examinations". Journal of Mathematics Competitions. 2 (1). Australian Mathematics Trust: 27–43.
- Pollard, Graham H.; Annice, C.; Taylor, P.J. (1990). "Gender differences in the australian mathematics competition". Journal of Mathematics Competitions. 3 (1). Australian Mathematics Trust: 34–41. doi:10.2466/pr0.1996.78.1.3. S2CID 143012476.
- Pollard, Graham H.; Taylor, P.J; Atkins, WJ (1997). "Standards of mathematics in secondary schools: an insight via competition". Journal of Mathematics Competitions. 10 (2). Australian Mathematics Trust: 29–37.
- Pollard, Graham; Noble, Ken (2001). "The increased reliability and efficiency of dynamic assessment methods". Journal of Mathematics Competitions. 14 (2). Australian Mathematics Trust: 22–34.
- Pollard, Graham H.; Noble, Ken (2002). "Dynamic assessment methods with substantially enhanced reliability and efficiency". Journal of Mathematics Competitions. 15 (2). Australian Mathematics Trust: 85–99.
- Pollard, Graham H.; Clark, David (2004). "A measure of the effectiveness of multiple choice tests in the presence of guessing: Part 1". Journal of Mathematics Competitions. 17 (1). Australian Mathematics Trust: 17–33.
- Pollard, Graham H.; Clark, David (2004). "A measure of the effectiveness of multiple choice tests in the presence of guessing: Part 2". Journal of Mathematics Competition. 17 (1). Australian Mathematics Trust: 34–47.
- Graham H. Pollard (1992). "The optimal test for selecting the greater of two binomial probabilities". Australian & New Zealand Journal of Statistics. 34 (2): 273–284. doi:10.1111/j.1467-842X.1992.tb01360.x.
- Warren J. Atkins and Gilah C. Leder and Peter J. O'Halloran and Graham H. Pollard and Peter Taylor (1991). "Measuring risk taking". Educational Studies in Mathematics. 22 (3): 297–308. doi:10.1007/BF00368343. S2CID 144034504.
- Graham Pollard (1990). "A method for determining the asymptotic efficiency of some sequential probability ratio tests". Australian & New Zealand Journal of Statistics. 32 (2): 191–204. doi:10.1111/j.1467-842X.1990.tb01012.x.
- G. H. Pollard (1989). "Scoring to remove guessing in multiple choice examinations". International Journal of Mathematical Education in Science and Technology. 20 (3): 429–432. doi:10.1080/0020739890200313.
- Graham Hilford Pollard (1988). "A stochastic analysis of scoring systems". Bulletin of the Australian Mathematical Society. 38 (2): 317–319. doi:10.1017/S000497270002760X. hdl:1885/133666.
- G. H. Pollard (1983). "An analysis of classical and tie-breaker tennis". Australian & New Zealand Journal of Statistics. 25 (3): 496–505. doi:10.1111/j.1467-842X.1983.tb01222.x.

ISSN WorldCat
OCLC 222178680, 222150321
