= Gwen Pharis Ringwood =

Canadian playwright (1910–1984)

- Born: August 13, 1910; Anatone, Washington, U.S.
- Died: May 24, 1984 (aged 73); Williams Lake, British Columbia, Canada
- Education: University of Alberta
- Occupation: Playwright
- Writing career
- Notable awards: Governor General's Award (1941)

Gwen Pharis Ringwood (August 13, 1910 Anatone, Washington – May 24, 1984 Williams Lake, British Columbia) was a Canadian playwright.

== Life ==
She graduated from the University of Alberta. She worked part-time as a secretary for Elizabeth Sterling Haynes, and then working at the Banff Centre for the Arts as registrar. She studied playwriting at University of North Carolina.

The theatre in Williams Lake, and an award for drama, given by the Writers' Guild of Alberta, are named for her.

Her papers are held at University of Calgary.

== Awards ==
- 1939 Dominion Drama Festival
- 1941 Governor General's Awards

== Books ==
- Younger Brother, Longmans, Green, 1959
- The Collected Plays of Gwen Pharis Ringwood. Ed: Enid Delgatty Rutland. Ottawa: Borealis Press, 1982. ISBN 978-0-88887-956-1
- The Gwen Pharis Ringwood Papers, Marlys Chevrefils, Shirley A. Onn, and Apollonia Steele, editors, February 1988, ISBN 0-919813-60-7

== Plays ==
- The Dragons of Kent, Banff School of Fine Arts, Alberta, 1935
- Chris Axelson, Blacksmith, University of North Carolina, 1938
- One Man's House, University of North Carolina, 1938
- Still Stands the House, Playmakers Theatre in Chapel Hill, North Carolina, 1938
- Pasque Flower, University of North Carolina, 1939
- The Days May Be Long, Unproduced, 1940
- Red Flag at Evening, University of Alberta Extension Department, Edmonton, 1940
- Saturday Night, University of Alberta Extension Department, Edmonton, 1940
- The Courting of Marie Jenvrin, Banff School of Fine Arts, Alberta, 1941
- Christmas 1943, University Women's Club, Edmonton, 1943
- The Rainmaker, 1944
- The Jack and the Joker, Banff School of Fine Arts, Alberta 1944
- Dark Harvest, University of Manitoba Dramatic Society, Winnipeg, 1945
- Stampede, Alberta Folklore and Local History Project, 1945
- Hatfield, the Rainmaker Banff School of Fine Arts, Alberta 1945
- Drowning at Wasyl Nemitchuck, The (A Fine Coloured Easter Egg), Banff School of Fine Arts, Alberta 1946
- Oh Canada, My Country, Edmonton, (1948 – 1951?)
- Widger's Way, University of Alberta, 1952
- Lament for Harmonica (Maya) Ottawa Little Theatre 1959
- Look Behind You, Neighbour, City of Edson, Alberta, 1961
- Lion and the Mouse, Cariboo Indian School, Williams Lake, B.C, 1964
- The Sleeping Beauty, Cariboo Indian School, Williams Lake, 1965
- The Three Wishes, Williams Lake School, 1965
- The Road Runs North, Williams Lake Junior High School, Williams Lake, 1967
- Encounters, Gwen Ringwood Theatre, Williams Lake, 1970
- The Deep Has Many Voices, Gwen Ringwood Theatre, Williams Lake, 1971
- The Stranger, Gwen Ringwood Theatre, Williams Lake, 1971
- The Golden Goose, Cariboo Indian School, Williams Lake 1973
- A Remembrance of Miracles, Gwen Ringwood Theatre, Williams Lake, 1975
- Lament for harmonica (1975)
- The Lodge, West Vancouver Little Theatre 1976
- Ludmilla's Odyssey
- The Magic Carpets of Antonio Angelini, St. Boniface Theatre Company, Winnipeg 1976
- Mirage, University of Saskatchewan, 1979
