= Alexander Kiselev (mathematician) =

American mathematician

- Born: 1969 (age 56–57)
- Citizenship: USA
- Education: Saint Petersburg State University; Caltech
- Awards: Guggenheim Fellowship
- Scientific career
- Fields: Spectral theory, partial differential equations, fluid mechanics
- Institutions: University of Wisconsin-Madison; Rice University; Duke University
- Doctoral advisor: Barry Simon

Alexander A. Kiselev (born 1969) is an American mathematician, specializing in spectral theory, partial differential equations, and fluid mechanics.

== Career ==
Alexander Kiselev received his bachelor's degree in 1992 from Saint Petersburg State University and his PhD in 1997 from Caltech under supervision of Barry Simon. In 1997-1998 he was a postdoctoral fellow at the Mathematical Sciences Research Institute, where he co-authored a paper on Christ–Kiselev maximal inequality. Between 1998 and 2002 he was an E. Dickson Instructor and then assistant professor at the University of Chicago where he worked with Peter Constantin on reaction-diffusion equations and fluid mechanics. In 2001, Kiselev solved one of the Simon problems, on existence of imbedded singular continuous spectrum of the Schrödinger operator with slowly decaying potential. He taught at the University of Wisconsin-Madison from 2002 to 2013, as an associate and full professor. He was a member of the Rice University faculty between 2013 and 2017. Since 2018, Kiselev is a William T. Laprade Professor of Mathematics at Duke University. His research has been profiled by Science Watch, Institute for Mathematics and its Applications, Duke Today and Quanta Magazine

== Awards and honors ==
- Sloan Research Fellowship, 2001
- Guggenheim Fellowship, 2012
- Invited speaker, 2018 International Congress of Mathematicians.
- 12th Brooke Benjamin Lecture, Oxford University, 2019
- Simons Foundation Fellow in Mathematics, 2020

== Publications ==
- "Alexander Kiselev: Google Scholar Profile". Google Scholar.
