= Edward Barbeau =

Canadian mathematician

- Born: Canada
- Citizenship: Canadian
- Education: University of Toronto, University of Newcastle-upon-Tyne
- Scientific career
- Fields: Mathematics
- Workplaces: University of Western Ontario, University of Toronto

Edward Barbeau is a Canadian mathematician and a Canadian Mathematical Educator. He is a Professor Emeritus at the University of Toronto Department of Mathematics.

== Awards ==
- Fellowship of the Ontario Institute for Studies in Education.
- David Hilbert Award from the World Federation of National Mathematics Competitions.
- Adrien Pouliot Award from the Canadian Mathematical Society.
- Inaugural fellow of the Canadian Mathematical Society, 2018
