= Roy Mitchell (theatre practitioner) =

Canadian-American theatre practitioner (1884–1944)

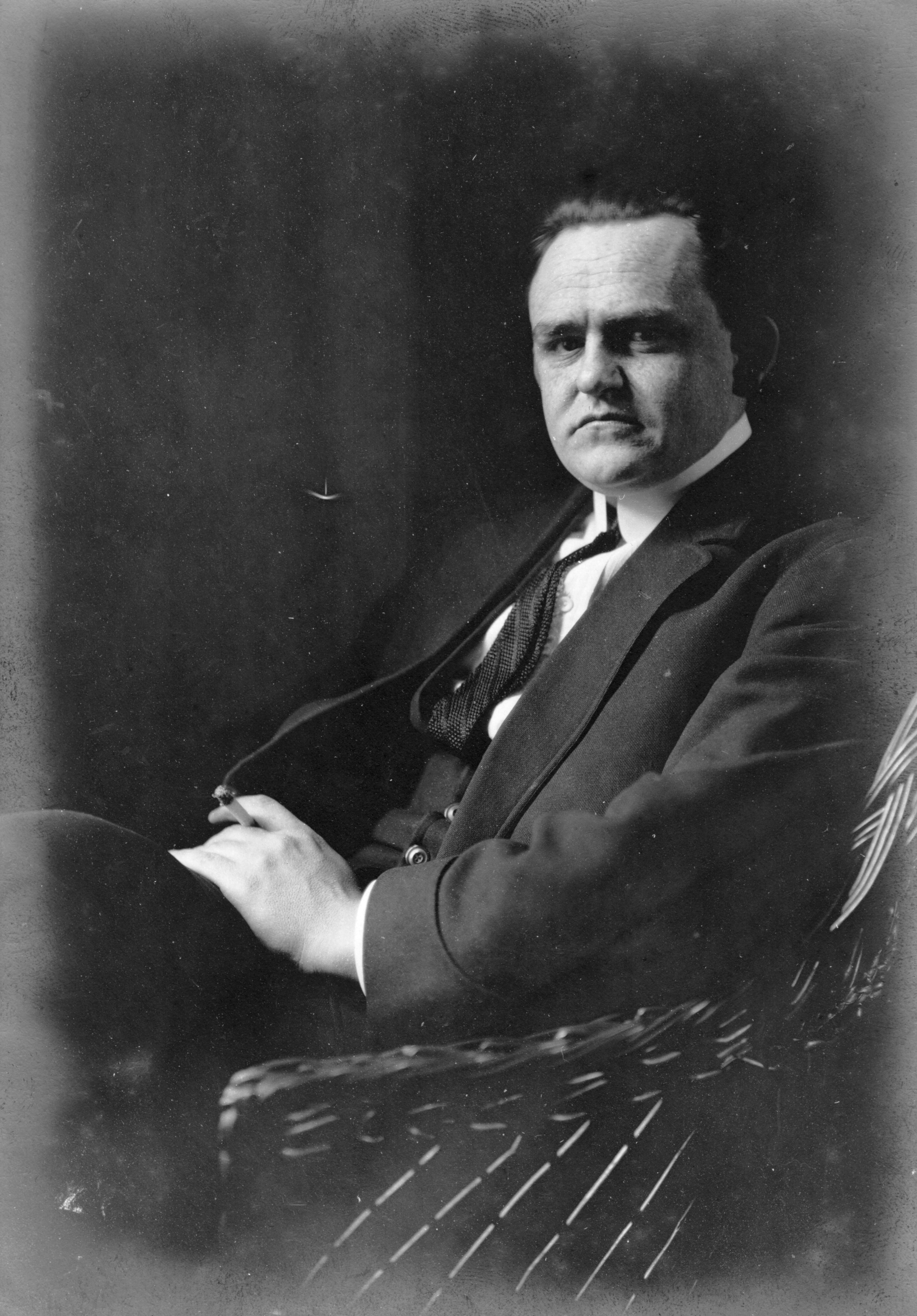
- Portrait of Roy Mitchell taken in 1910, from the M.O. Hammond fonds held at the Archives of Ontario.
- Born: February 4, 1884; Fort Gratiot Township, Michigan
- Died: July 27, 1944 (aged 60); Canaan, Connecticut
- Education: University of Toronto
- Occupations: Journalist; theatre director; professor
- Notable work: Creative Theatre (1929)
- Movement: Little theatre
- Spouse: Jocelyn Taylor (1926– )

Roy Matthews Mitchell (4 February 1884 – 27 July 1944) was a Canadian-American theatre practitioner who played an important role in little theatre in Canada and the United States. He was involved in the creation and was the first artistic director of the Hart House Theatre at the University of Toronto, and was an influence on Vincent Massey, Herman Voaden and Mavor Moore. In 1974 Moore wrote "in 1929, Roy Mitchell was a voice crying in the near-wilderness of Canada" and called him "the seer who said it all on our own doorstep nearly half a century ago." A later scholar wrote that Mitchell's "vision ... did not fully come to pass in his lifetime, nor did it subsequently."

== Biography ==
Mitchell was born in Michigan in 1884 to Canadian parents. The family returned to Canada in 1886 and moved to Toronto in 1889, where Mitchell attended Harbord Collegiate Institute and then the University of Toronto. He became a journalist and worked at various newspapers, including the Toronto World until 1915.

Mitchell was a founding member of the Arts and Letters Club of Toronto in 1908, and there formed the Arts and Letters Players, which put on many shows at the club. The first was Interior by Maurice Maeterlinck in 1911; others included The Shadowy Waters by W. B. Yeats, The Workhouse Ward by Lady Gregory, and the North American premieres of Rabindranath Tagore's The Post Office (in 1914) and Chitra (in 1916). These productions, directed by Mitchell, "introduced skeptical Toronto audiences to the principles of theatrical modernism," and the Arts and Letters Players "became the foremost group in Toronto's amateur theatre."

Mitchell was an "ardent Theosophist," a belief shared with other Arts and Letters Club members such as Lawren Harris and Merrill Denison. He joined the Toronto Theosophical Society in 1910 and wrote a handbook, Theosophy in Action, in 1923. In 1925 Mitchell and philanthropist Dudley Barr founded the Blavatsky Institute to print Theosophical texts. In 1926 the Toronto Daily Star said his "connection with the Theosophical Society made his name prominent throughout Canada." Theosophy was important in his theatre work, and this was reflected in productions such as The Trojan Women at Hart House and in his book Creative Theatre.

Mitchell moved to New York City in 1916 to study and work in theatre, mostly in Greenwich Village. In 1917 he was technical director for the first season of the Greenwich Village Theatre. In 1918 he returned to Canada, and worked as Director of Motion Pictures at the Department of Information in Ottawa.

Mitchell knew Vincent Massey from the Arts and Letters Club, and worked with him in creating the Hart House Theatre, which opened in 1919. Mitchell moved back to Toronto be its first artistic director. Plays he directed there include:

- March 1920: The Trojan Women by Euripides, with music by Healey Willan and set design by Arthur Lismer
- June 1920: Love's Labour's Lost by William Shakespeare, with music by Willan; Mitchell did the set and lighting design
- June 1921 Cymbeline by Shakespeare, with music by Willan and set design by Merrill Denison and Lismer

Cymbeline was his last Hart House production. After two seasons, and disagreements with the Board of Syndics about concentrating on Canadian plays, he left. He spent two years on the west coast of Canada, then returned to Toronto, where for a while he taught scene design at the Ontario College of Art. Through the 1920s he lectured extensively on Theosophy and little theatre in Canada and the United States.

Mitchell married Jocelyn Taylor on 17 May 1926 at the Church of St. Mary Magdalene. She had worked with him on stage productions for several years, doing sets, costumes and lighting. The Toronto Daily Star announcement of the wedding described Mitchell as "author, lecturer, theatrical director, theosophical leader and onetime newspaperman" and Taylor as a "well-known artist and sculptress." In 1929 they moved to New York City. Mavor Moore wrote, "Mitchell left for New York to teach and write about the theatre Canada was not yet ready for."

In 1930 Mitchell was appointed to the Faculty of Dramatic Art at New York University. There he developed a system of phonetic notation that allowed people to sing folk songs in other languages. He formed a seven-member singing group called The Consort (Jocelyn Taylor was a member) that sang songs in forty languages and dialects.

In 1934, Mitchell and his wife joined the faculty of the Banff Centre for Arts and Creativity, known then as the Banff School of Drama.

Mitchell died on 27 July 1944 in Canaan, Connecticut. He and Taylor had no children.

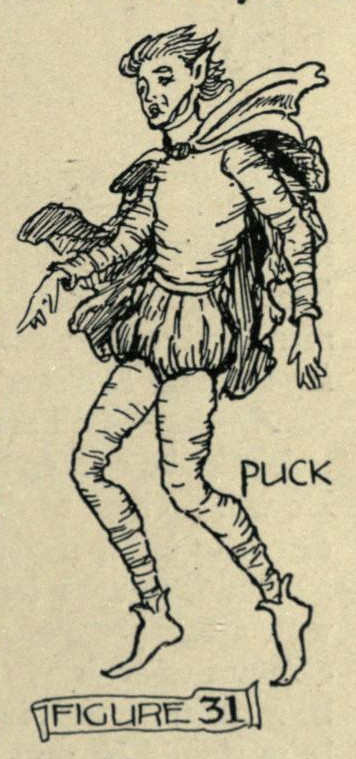
J. E. H. MacDonald illustration of Shakespeare's Puck, from Shakespeare for Community Players (1919)

== Writing ==
Mitchell wrote books and articles about theatre and Theosophy. Some of his articles appeared in Theatre Arts Monthly and The Canadian Theosophist.

Shakespeare for Community Players (1919) has illustrations by J. E. H. MacDonald. A review in the Canadian Bookman said, "It is not too much to say that Mr. Mitchell is a genius in the art of stage production. Thoroughly imbued with a sense of the importance of the theatrical art to the community (it is no exaggeration to say that he conceives of it as a form of religion), he is perfectly willing to place all his knowledge and experience at the disposal of other producers."

Creative Theatre was published in 1929, with illustrations by his wife and colleague Jocelyn Taylor. Mavor Moore said it "constructs a vision of the theatre that foreshadows, often in clairvoyant detail, the ideas of Artaud on movement, of Brecht on audiences, of Guthrie on ritual, of Peter Brook on the open space, and of Grotowski on the monastic community." Scott Duschene, who edited a critical edition of the book in 2020, wrote that "while [it is] imbued with the spirit of the little theatre movement in Canada, Creative Theatre is equally steeped in the world of theosophy."

== Bibliography ==
- Shakespeare for Community Players, with illustrations by J. E. H. MacDonald (Toronto: J.M. Dent and Sons, 1919)
- Theosophy in Action (Toronto: Blavatsky Institute, 1923)
- The School Theatre: A Handbook of Theory and Practice, with illustrations by Jocelyn Taylor (Toronto: National Council of Education, 1925)
- Creative Theatre (New York: John Daly, 1929), with illustrations by Jocelyn Taylor; see also Creative Theatre: A Critical Edition, edited by Scott Duschene (Ottawa: University of Ottawa Press, 2020) ISBN 9780776626628
- Theosophic Study and A White Lotus Address (Toronto: Blavatsky Institute, 1945)
- Through Temple Doors: Studies in Occult Masonry (Toronto: Blavatsky Institute, 1945)
- Theosophy in Action (Toronto: Blavatsky Institute, 1951)
- The Creative Spirit of Art (Westwood, NJ: Kindle Press, 1969)
- The Exile of the Soul: The Case for Two Souls in the Constitution of Every Man, edited by John L. Davenport (Buffalo, NY: Prometheus Books, 1983) ISBN 0879752335
