= Crux Mathematicorum =

- Discipline: Mathematics
- Language: English
- Edited by: Kseniya Garaschuk

Publication details
- Former name(s): Eureka
- History: 1975–present
- Publisher: Canadian Mathematical Society (Canada)

Standard abbreviations
- ISO 4: Crux Math.

Indexing
- ISSN: 1706-8142 (print); 1496-4309 (web)

Links
- Journal homepage

Crux Mathematicorum is a scientific journal of mathematics published by the Canadian Mathematical Society. It contains mathematical problems for secondary school and undergraduate students. Its editor-in-chief is Kseniya Garaschuk.

The journal was established in 1975, under the name Eureka, by the Carleton-Ottawa Mathematics Association, with Léo Sauvé as its first editor-in-chief. It took the name Crux Mathematicorum with its fourth volume, in 1978, to avoid confusion with another journal Eureka published by the Cambridge University Mathematical Society. The Canadian Mathematical Society took over the journal in 1985, and soon afterwards G.W. (Bill) Sands became its new editor. Bruce L. R. Shawyer took over as editor in 1996. In 1997 it merged with another journal founded in 1988, Mathematical Mayhem, to become Crux Mathematicorum with Mathematical Mayhem. Jim Totten became editor in 2003, and Václav (Vazz) Linek replaced him in 2008.

Ross Honsberger writes that "for interesting elementary problems, this publication is in a class by itself". The journal is also known for reviving interest in Japanese temple geometry problems by publishing a series of them beginning in 1984. The website IMOmath.com has made available problems involving inequalities from its first four volumes and calls the publication "the best problem solving journal all over the world". Since January 2019, Crux Mathematicorum became a free online publication thanks to the support of the Intact Foundation.
