= Pacific Institute for the Mathematical Sciences =

Canadian-based research institute

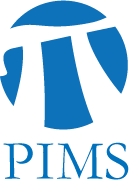
- Established: 1996
- Focus: Mathematics
- Director: Özgür Yilmaz
- Location: Vancouver, British Columbia
- Website: pims.math.ca

The Pacific Institute for the Mathematical Sciences (PIMS) is a mathematical institute created in 1996 by universities in Western Canada and the Northwestern United States to promote research and excellence in all areas of the mathematical sciences. It provides training and support for graduate students and post-doctoral researchers hosted at member institutions. It also supports visiting researchers and hosts events ranging from individual lectures to multi-year "collaborative research groups (CRGs)" in the mathematical sciences. Additionally, PIMS has a large educational outreach program aimed at promoting mathematics at all levels but with particular focus on primary and secondary levels (K–12).

== Structure ==
PIMS has a distributed structure. Its central offices are located on the campus of the University of British Columbia. The members of the institute are:

- 10 full members: University of British Columbia, University of Calgary, University of Alberta, University of Regina, University of Victoria, University of Saskatchewan, Simon Fraser University, University of Washington, University of Lethbridge, and University of Manitoba.
- 4 affiliate members: University of Portland, University of Northern British Columbia, Athabasca University and First Nations University of Canada.

PIMS receives funding from NSERC and provincial governments. In 2007, the institute became a Unité Mixte Internationale of the French CNRS.

PIMS Directors: Nassif Ghoussoub (1995–2003), Ivar Ekeland (2003–2008), Alejandro Adem (2008–2015), Martin Barlow (2015–2016), James Colliander (2016–2021), Jayadev Athreya (2021–2022), Özgür Yılmaz (2022-2027).

== Research program ==
Research at PIMS includes both hostings of events and support for personnel. Post-doctoral researchers, visitors and graduate students supported by PIMS are hosted at one of the sites for the duration of their stay. The event programs include individual lectures, seminar series and scientific meetings. An international scientific review panel adjudicates event applications and decides on the scientific programs. Longer term projects are supported as Collaborative Research Groups which will typically include a series of thematic activities such as summer schools and workshops, as well as postdoctoral fellow. PIMS also supports an International Graduate Training Centre (IGTC) that focuses on Mathematical Biology.

== Education and outreach ==
PIMS is involved in all levels of mathematical education from Elementary School onwards. In British Columbia, PIMS organizes the Elementary Math Contest (Elmacon), an annual competition open to grades 5, 6 and 7. Math Mania is directed at high school students and uses interactive games and demonstrations to introduce students to mathematical concepts. PIMS also runs teacher workshops in many rural areas and conferences. For example, the annual 'Changing the Culture' conference which brings together teachers and educators to discuss issues and new developments relating to mathematics education. Outreach to Aboriginal and First Nations students is also a strong focus for the BC and Saskatchewan sites, with annual summer camps, programs and resources aimed at providing increased learning opportunities for those students, for example, the Aboriginal Perspectives website established in 2009.

=== mathtube.org ===
In October 2011, PIMS launched a new multimedia site, mathtube.org. This site includes lecture videos, slides and notes from significant PIMS lectures from the past decade, as well as recent events. The site was created to meet the increasing demand to see lecture content online. The site features notable speakers such as Edward Witten, Ram Murty, Dusa McDuff and George Papanicolaou, and is updated regularly.

== See also ==
- CRM–Fields–PIMS prize
