= Jeremy Kerr =

Canadian biology professor

Academic work
- Main interests: Conservation biology, Macroecology, Global Change Biology, Pollinator conservation, Butterfly ecology
- Website: macroecology.ca

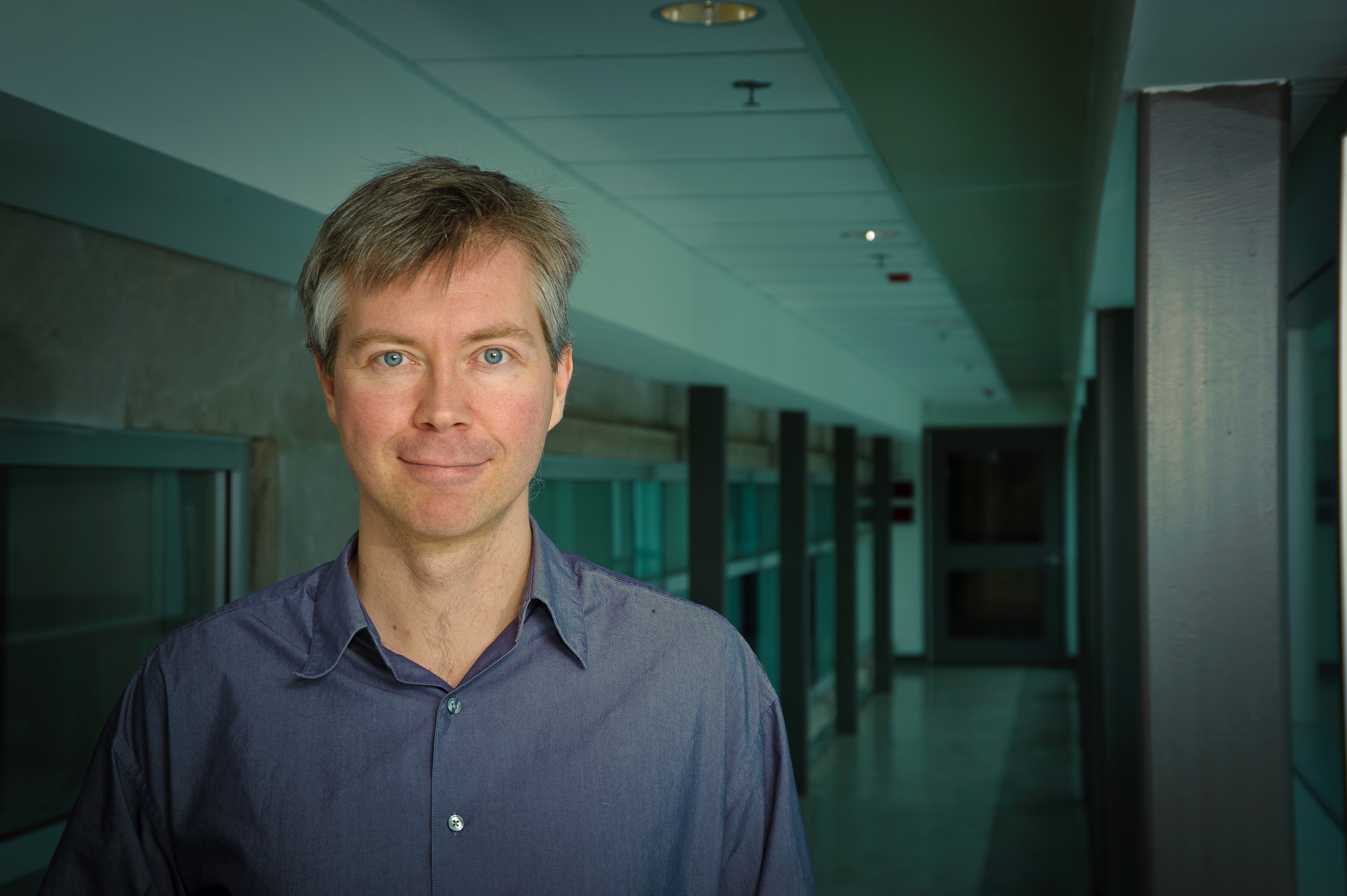
Jeremy Kerr, University Research Chair in Macroecology and Conservation at the University of Ottawa and member of NSERC Council.

Jeremy Kerr is a biology professor at the University of Ottawa (uOttawa) where he holds the University Research Chair in Macroecology and Conservation. Kerr is a member of the NSERC Council, including its executive committee, and the past president of the Canadian Society for Ecology and Evolution (CSEE). He is the Chair of NSERC's Committee on Discovery Research and a founding member of its EDI subcommittee. In 2021, Kerr was elected to be a member of Sigma Xi Society and is an elected lifetime Fellow of the American Association for the Advancement of Science, and of the Royal Society of Biology.

While CSEE president (2016–18), Kerr led development of the society's Equity, Diversity and Inclusion (EDI) policies, including its first Diversity and Inclusion Statement. Kerr has also helped develop EDI policy frameworks at NSERC that contributes to inclusion in research environments nationally in Canada. He served as an expert witness to the House of Commons Standing Committee on Science and Research, giving testimony on the need for progress on inclusion in research, and on the need to expand federal support for students. He has written extensively on this subject. Kerr was strongly engaged in the creation of Canada's current Chief Science Advisor position and was invited to Parliament with Dr. Kirsty Duncan for the announcement of the role. Kerr has also been involved with federal budget discussions around support for science through public science, media engagement, and writing, and in the protection and restoration of scientific integrity in federal decision-making.

As an ecologist and conservation biologist, Kerr is active in public science and citizen science and co-founded eButterfly in his laboratory. His research has focused extensively on understanding how environmental change, including especially climate change, affects life on Earth. Kerr is a well-known public science figure, featuring in scientific presentations at the National Arts Centre, Parliament of Canada, and in printed and broadcast media (e.g. New York Times, BBC, CNN, Time Magazine, CBC's Quirks and Quarks). He contributed as an expert witness on climate change, biodiversity, and protected areas networks in testimony to the House of Commons Standing Committee on the Environment and Sustainable Development. He is also heavily engaged at the science-policy interface, including the expansion of Canada's protected areas network.

== Awards ==
- 1999 Governor General's Gold Academic Medal
- 2002 Province of Ontario Early Researcher Award
- 2009 University of Ottawa Young Researcher Award in Science and Technology
- 2016 Excellence in Media Relations award

== Education ==
=== Undergraduate ===
University of Ottawa, Department of Biology.

=== PhD ===
Department of Biology, York University with Laurence Packer.

=== Post-Doc ===
Department of Zoology of University of Oxford with Lord Robert May and Sir Richard Southwood.

== Bibliography ==
=== Selected publications ===
- Ednie, G., J. T. Kerr. 2022. High resolution thermal remote sensing and the limits of species tolerance. PeerJ Life & Environment. https://peerj.com/articles/13911/
- Flynn, A., and J. T. Kerr. 2022. Inclusive teaching: from preparation to delivery. Pressbooks Open Library. https://ecampusontario.pressbooks.pub/inclusiveeducation/
- Gordon, S., and J. T. Kerr. 2022. Floral diversity increases butterfly diversity in a multitrophic metacommunity. Ecology https://doi.org/10.1002/ecy.3735
- Soroye, P., T. Newbold, and J. T. Kerr. 2020. Climate change contributes to widespread declines among bumble bees across continents. Science 367: 685–688. https://www.science.org/doi/10.1126/science.aax8591
- Kerr, J. T. 2019. A cocktail of poisons. Science 356: 1331–1332. https://www.science.org/doi/10.1126/science.aan6173
- Kerr J. T., et al. 2015. Climate change impacts on bumblebees converge across continents. Science 349: 177–180. https://doi.org/10.1126/science.aaa7031
- Kerr, J. T., H. M. Kharouba, and D. J. Currie. 2007. The macroecological contribution to global change solutions. Science 316: 1581–1584. https://www.science.org/doi/10.1126/science.1133267

== OUPFB Field Course ==
Kerr is the long-time course director for Wildlife and Ecology of East African Ecosystems, a field course offered by the Ontario Universities Program in Field Biology (OUPFB). Examples from his field course photography collection include detailed metadata explaining lion behaviours in Tanzania, available in uOttawa's open access digital collection.
