= Brazos Bend State Park =

State park in Texas, United States

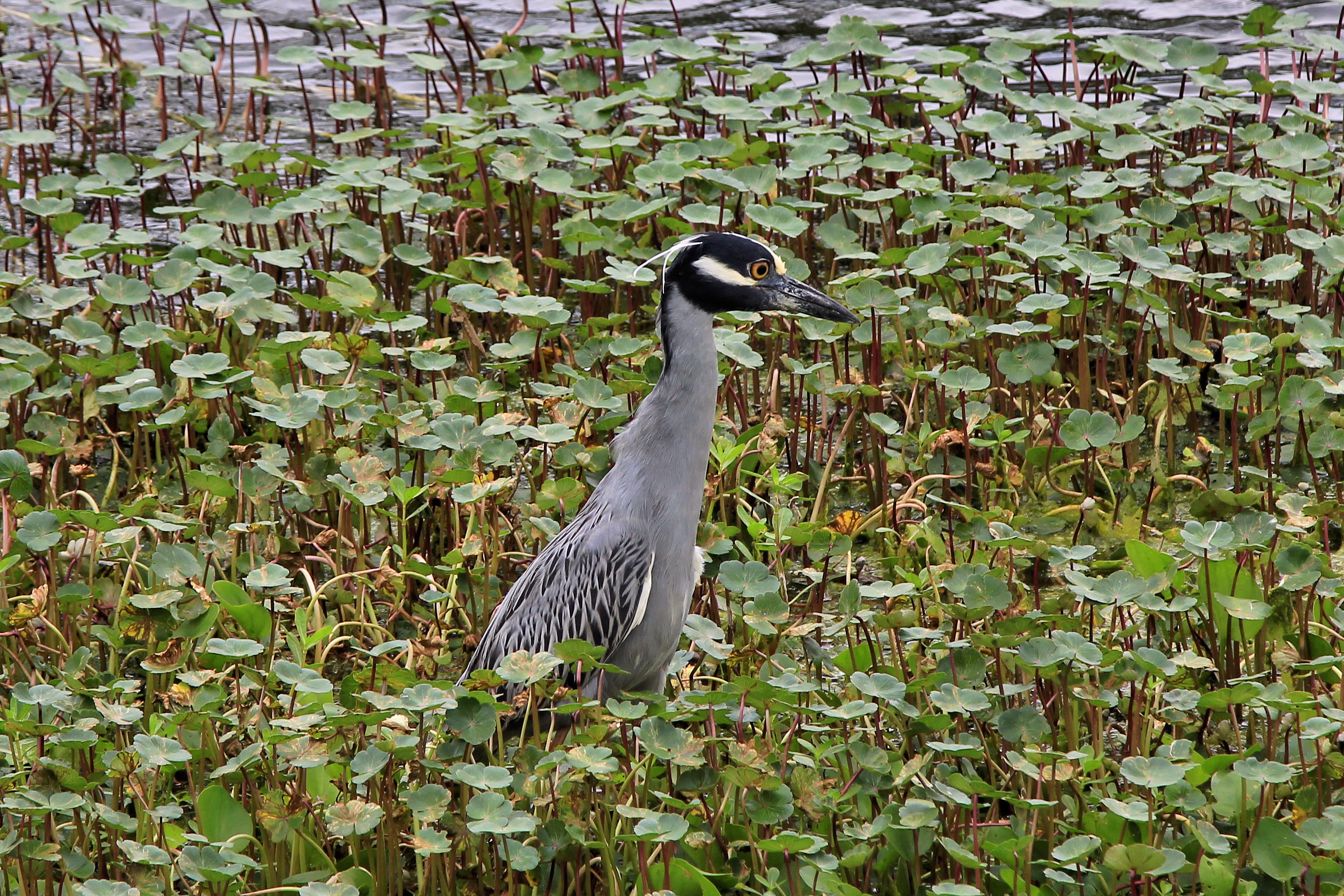
- A yellow-crowned night heron in Brazos Bend

- Location within Texas
- Location: Fort Bend County, Texas
- Nearest city: Needville, Texas
- Coordinates: 29°22′44″N 95°35′42″W
- Area: 4,897 acres (19.82 km^{2})
- Established: 1984
- Visitors: 227,417 (in 2025)
- Governing body: Texas Parks and Wildlife Department
- Website: Official site

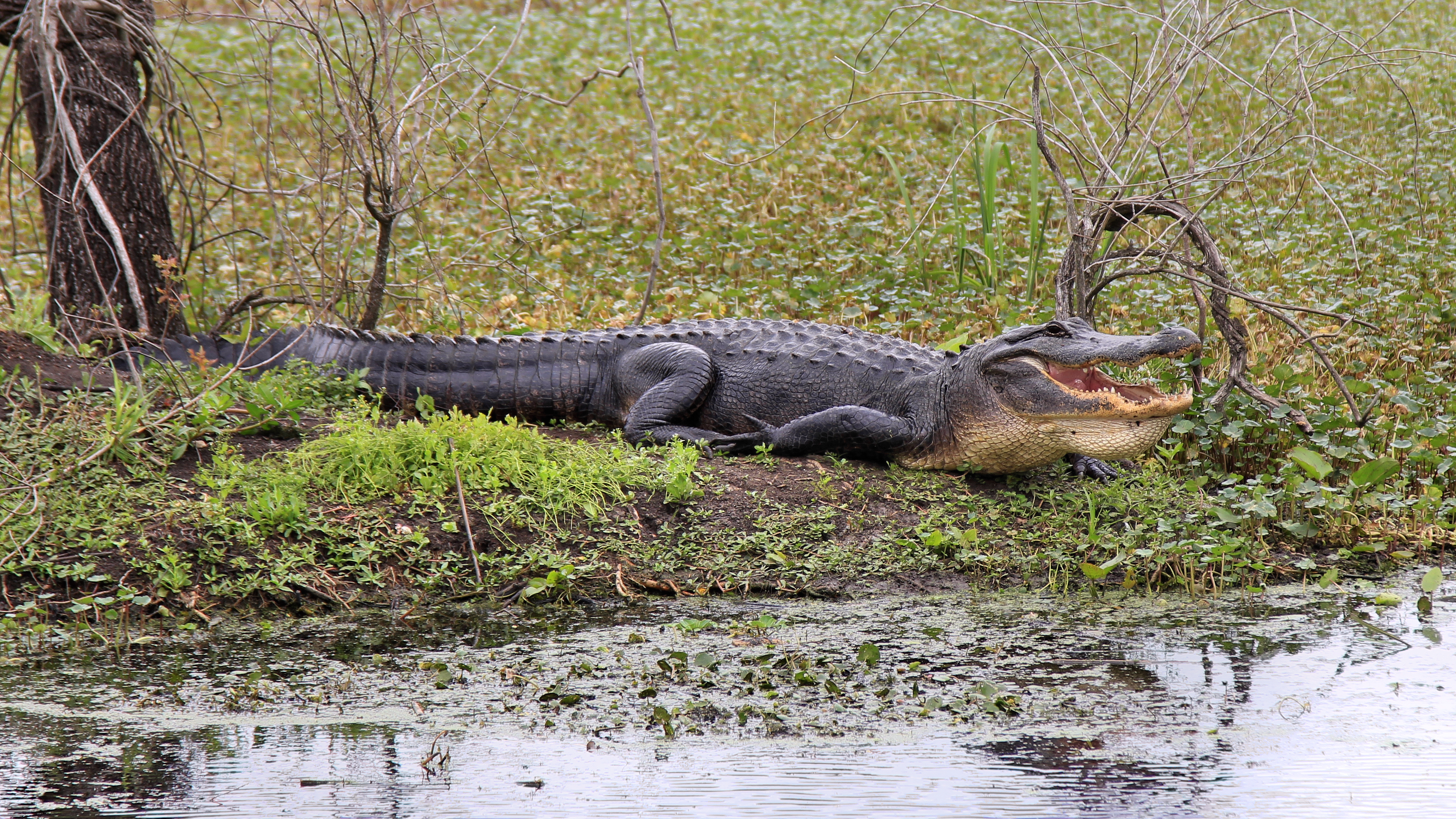
An American Alligator along the Spillway Trail.

Brazos Bend State Park is a 4,897-acre (1,982 ha) state park along the Brazos River in unincorporated Fort Bend County, Texas, United States. run by the Texas Parks and Wildlife Department. The park opened in 1984 and is open year-round, with the exception of several weekends a year during which it is closed for controlled hunts to manage the white-tailed deer population.

== History ==
Brazos Bend State Park occupies land bordering the Brazos River and includes within its boundaries low-lying areas left over from the River's previous meanderings. Pre-Columbian inhabitants included a series of Native American groups, most notably the Karankawa. The land passed through a variety of landowners' hands, resulting in some of the existing structures on the park grounds, including a brick cistern. The park's current nature center is built into a structure previously utilized as a hunting cabin. Over the years, improvements were made to the various water bodies in the park for both recreational and flood management purposes. A low-elevation levied walkway surrounds the perimeter of some of the larger water bodies (Elm Lake, 40 Acre Lake, etc.). While significant modifications were made to the land within the park in the past, the current management strategy is to allow, in balance with the recreational elements of the park's mission, the maintenance of a natural landscape. In 1984 the park was officially opened to the public, its lands having been donated to the state several years previously. In 2009, the park celebrated its 25th anniversary with a variety of special events and recognitions. Today the park is operated by the Texas Parks and Wildlife Department, which manages state parks across Texas and oversees conservation, recreation, and public access programs within protected lands."Brazos Bend State Park". Texas Parks and Wildlife Department.

== Nature ==
The park is home to wildlife and plants spanning many distinct biomes. Brazos Bend contains areas of coastal prairie, bottomland forest, and wetlands including open and semi-open lakes and transitional marshlands.

=== Animals ===
Highlights of the park's numerous inhabitants include over 300 species of resident and visiting migratory birds such as black-bellied whistling duck, snowy egret, great egret, American white ibis, yellow-crowned night heron, northern cardinal, American coot and great blue heron. Mammals such as the white-tailed deer, Mexican long-nosed armadillo, common raccoon, and nutria are found in the park. The most noteworthy and popular residents of the park are the relatively large population of American alligator.

== Recreational opportunities ==
Although it contains recreational day-use areas (including a dining hall, campground, and picnic areas) Brazos Bend is by primary character a natural park. Its recreational opportunities revolve around enjoyment of its diverse ecosystems and species. Popular activities include hiking, fishing, and wildlife viewing. Like in much of the upper Gulf Coast located along the northern vanguard areas of the Central Flyway migratory route, bird watching in Brazos Bend is a popular activity, especially during the migratory seasons. The park offers numerous Scouting programs, an orienteering course and is a popular spot for geocaching.

== Educational programs ==
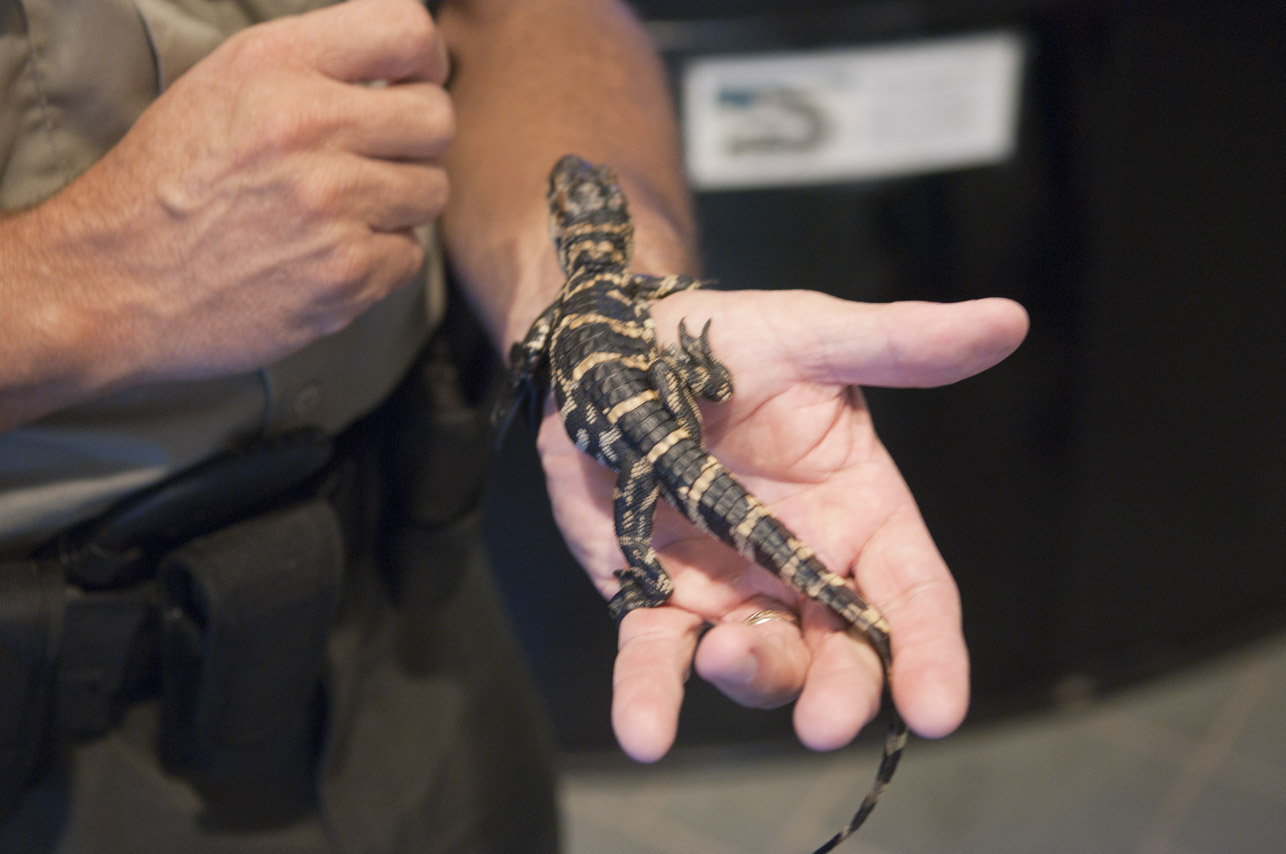
A park ranger shows a baby alligator.

The Texas Parks and Wildlife staff and the Brazos Bend State Park Volunteer Organization put on a variety of education programs on a weekly basis at the park, and actively conduction outreach efforts in the local area. Popular programs include bird and photography hikes, alligator and snake education programs, and guided hikes of Creekfield Lake. In addition, a rotating assortment of crafts, story time and other educational programs are offered each week. Outside of scheduled programs, the Volunteer Organization also staffs and maintains a Nature Center containing live individuals representing many of the park's venomous and nonvenomous native snake species, baby alligators, and a host of educational displays and activities.

== George Observatory ==
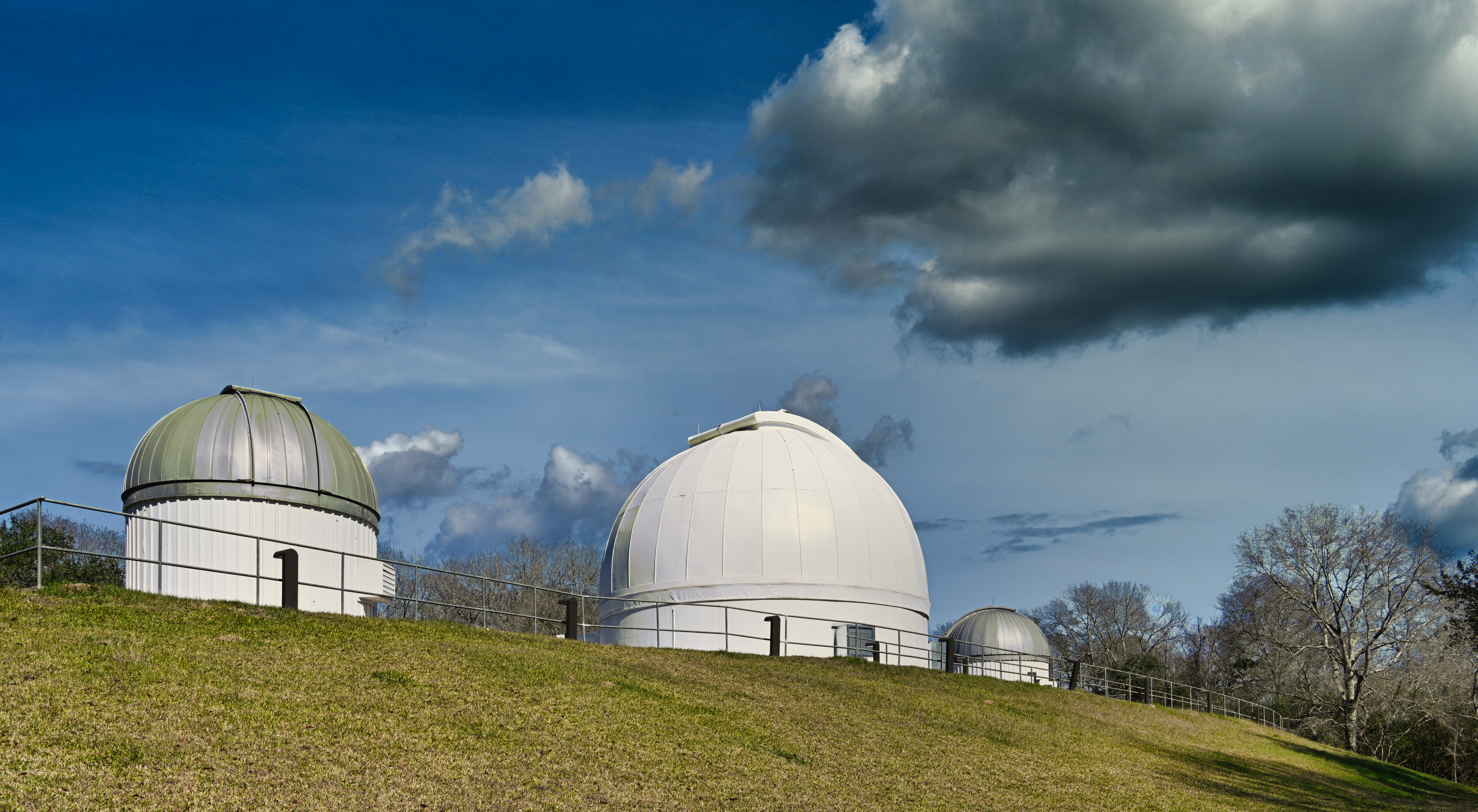
George Observatory

Minor planets discovered: 214
see List of minor planets § Main index

The park is also home to the George Observatory (code: 735), a satellite facility of the Houston Museum of Natural Science. This astronomical observatory contains three domed telescopes; the largest is the Gueymard Research Telescope, which has an aperture of 0.91 m (36 in). The facility is primarily focused on public education; it includes the Challenger Learning Center for space science education and also features an exhibit of meteorites.

== Annual events ==
In addition to the weekly hikes, educational programs, and other amenities offered by Park staff and volunteers, Brazos Bend plays host to a growing number of annual events and festivals. Highlights of the park's yearly offerings include the A Simple Christmas celebration, Prairie Heritage Days, and the July 4th Bike Parade. The park also hosts a variety of activities put on in conjunction with other entities, including the Christmas Bird Count and the Butterfly count, undertaken as part of the Audubon Society and North American Butterfly Association's national efforts, respectively. Brazos Bend State Park's Christmas Bird Count effort is routinely in the top 3-4% of the over 2000 Counts taking place in North America.

== Gallery ==
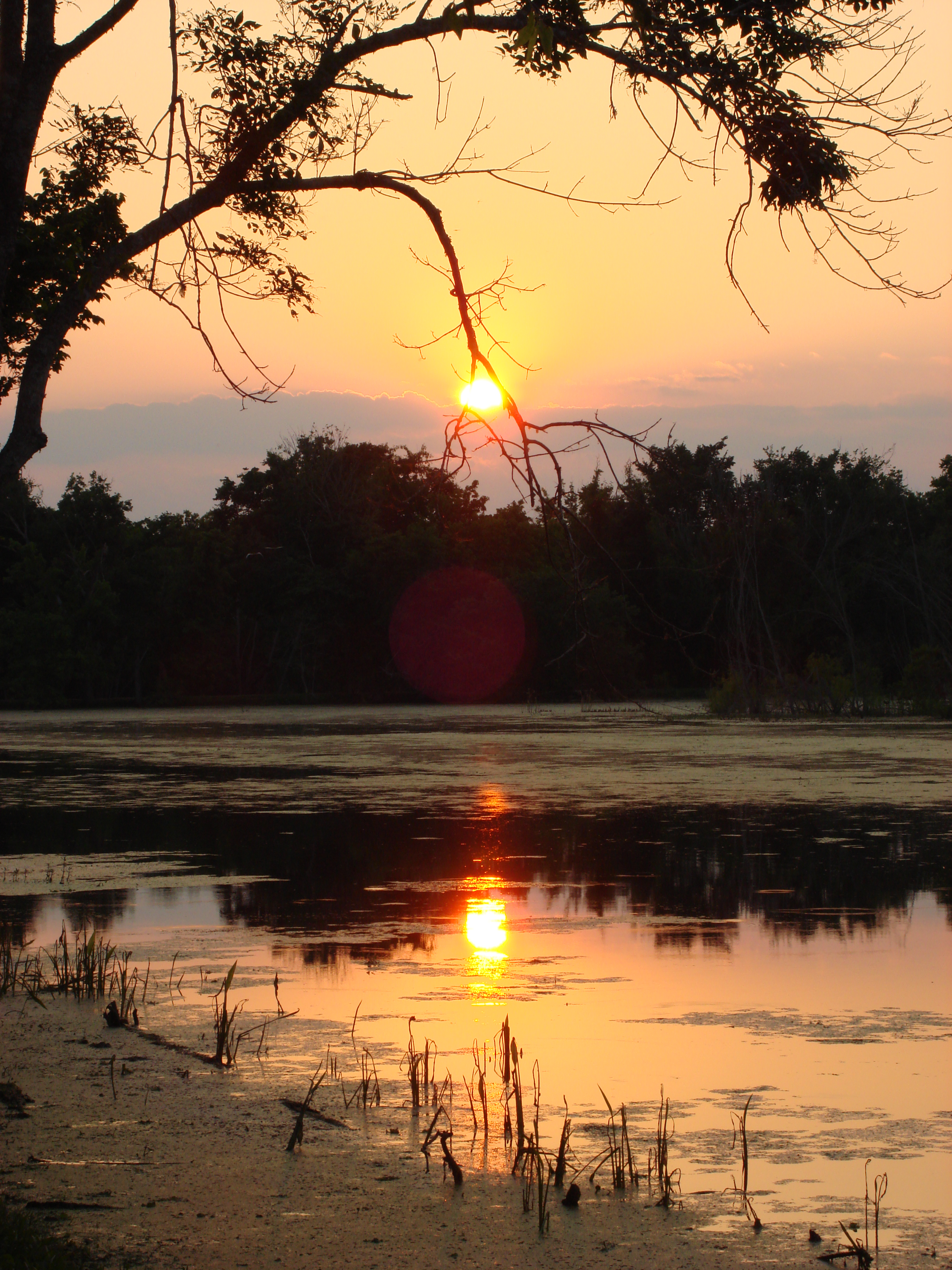
Elm Lake during evening.

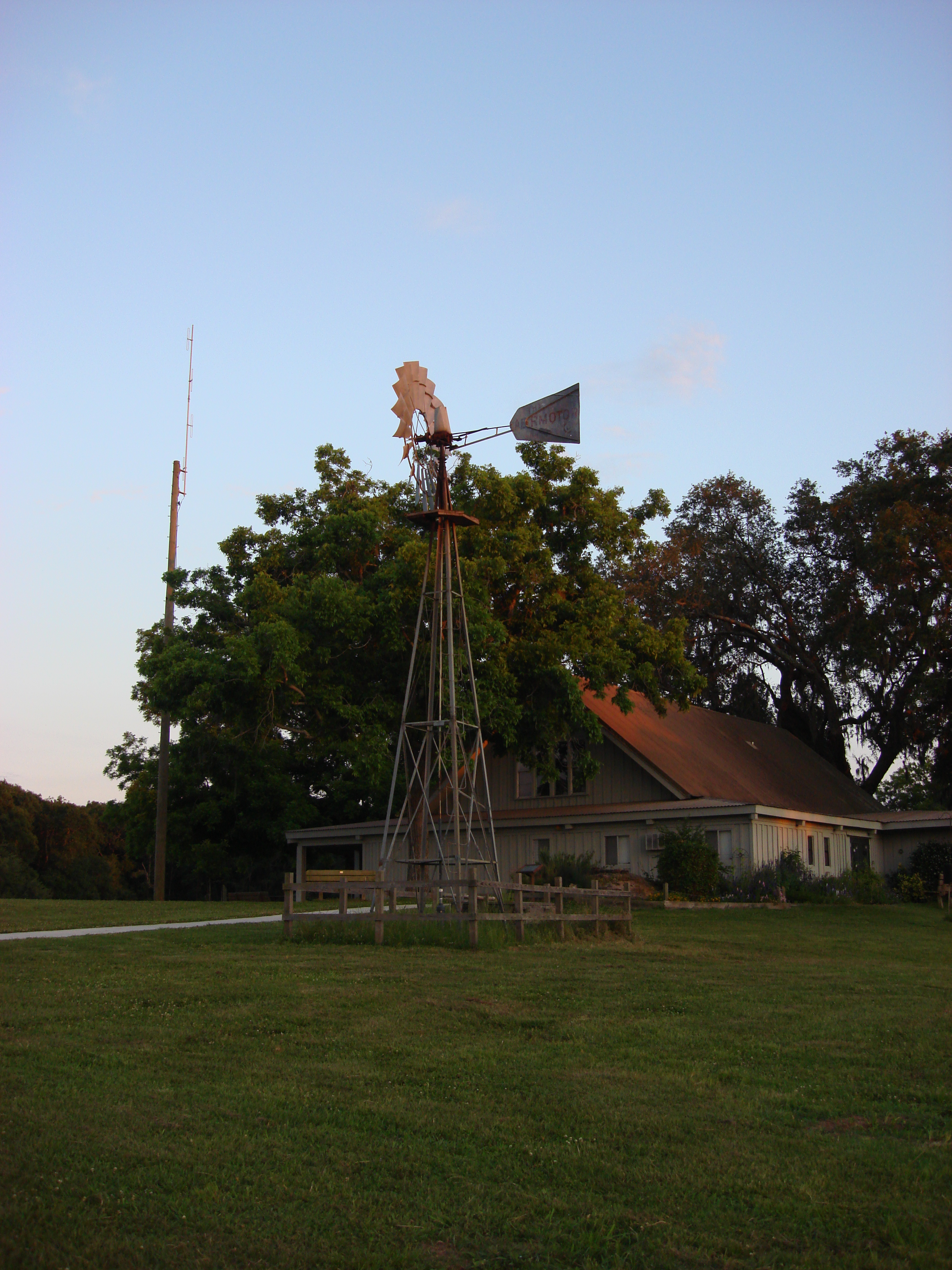
Windmill near Nature Center

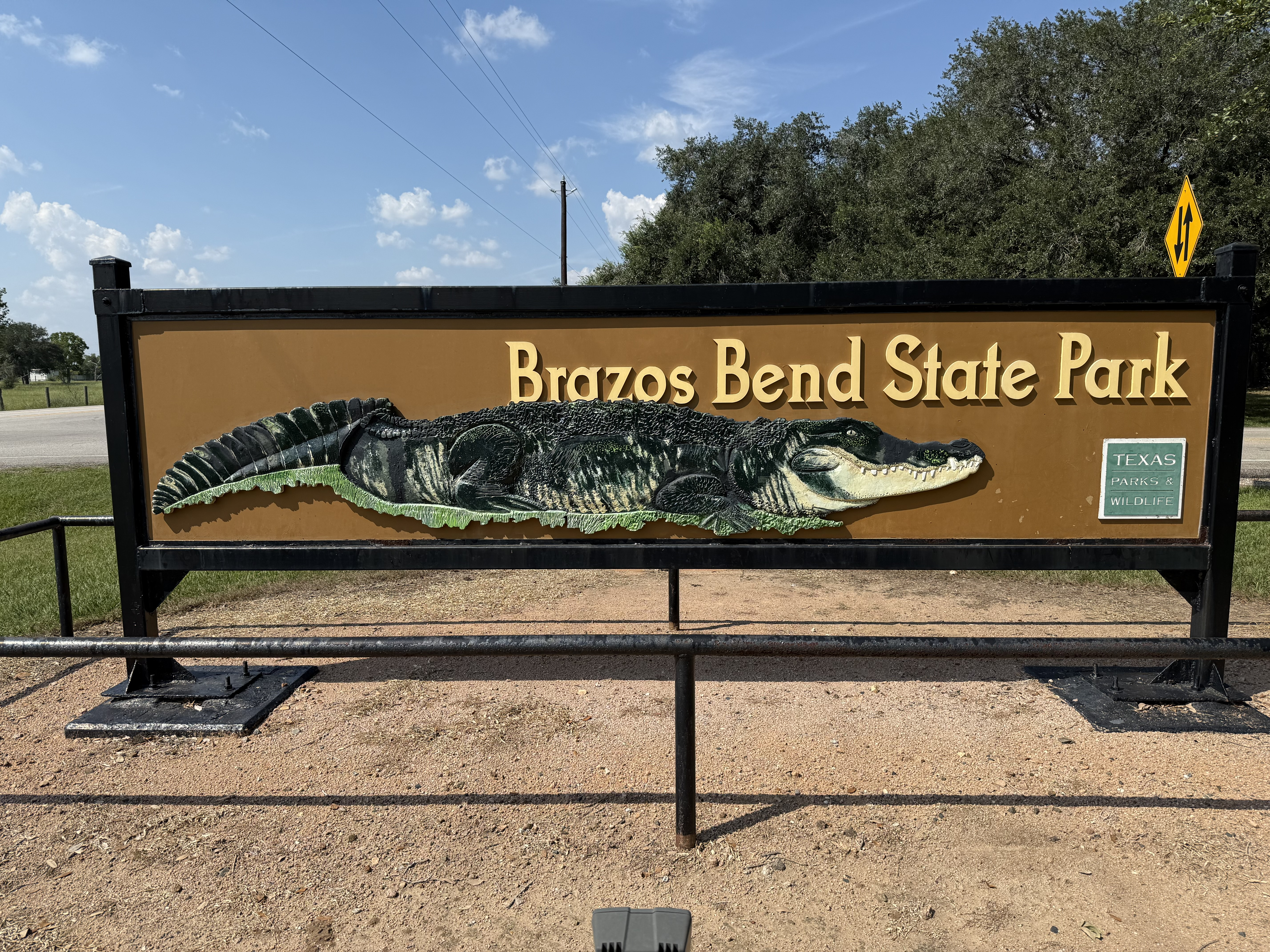
Brazos Bend State Park Entrance Sign in 2025

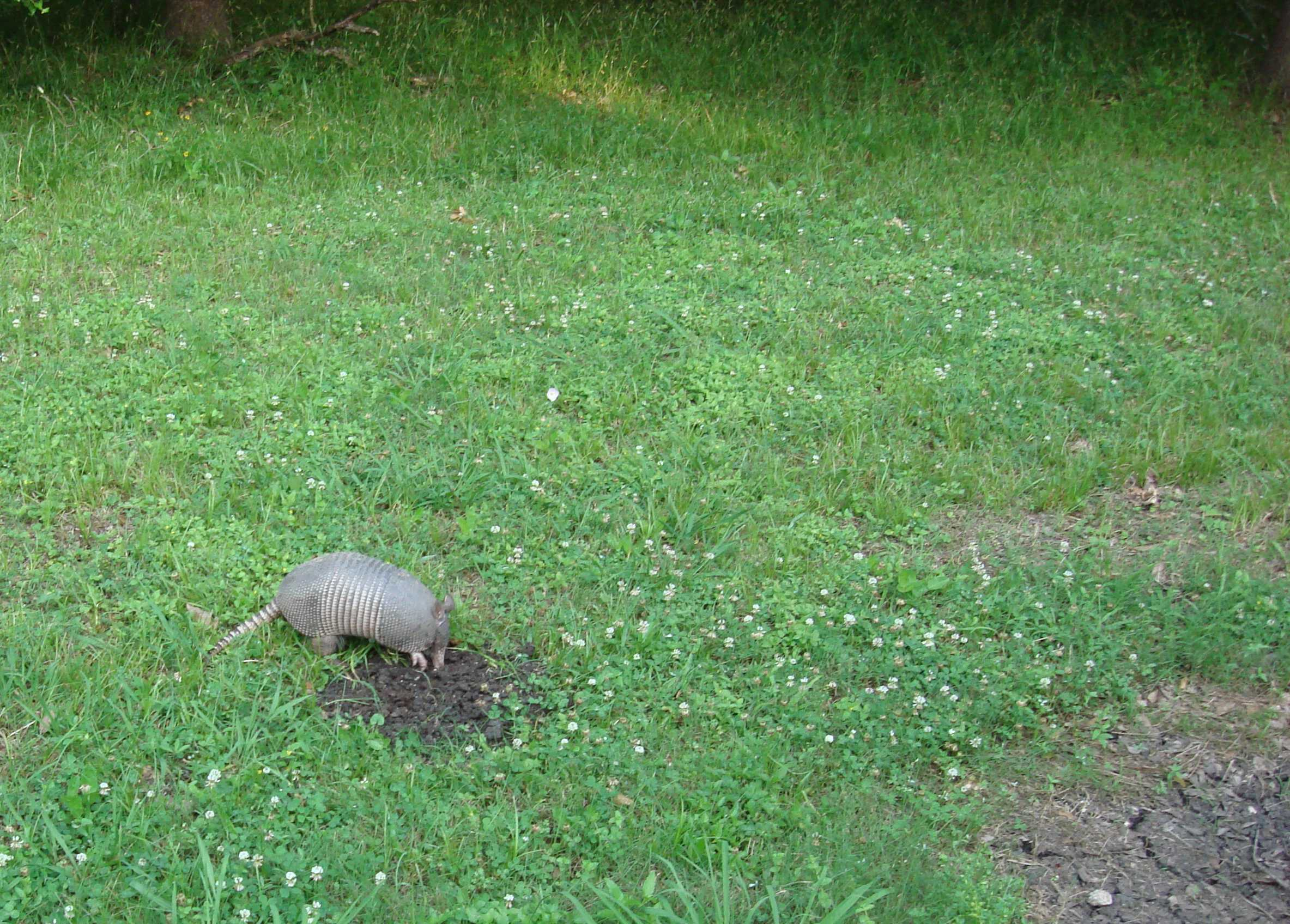
Armadillo near Burr Oak camping area.

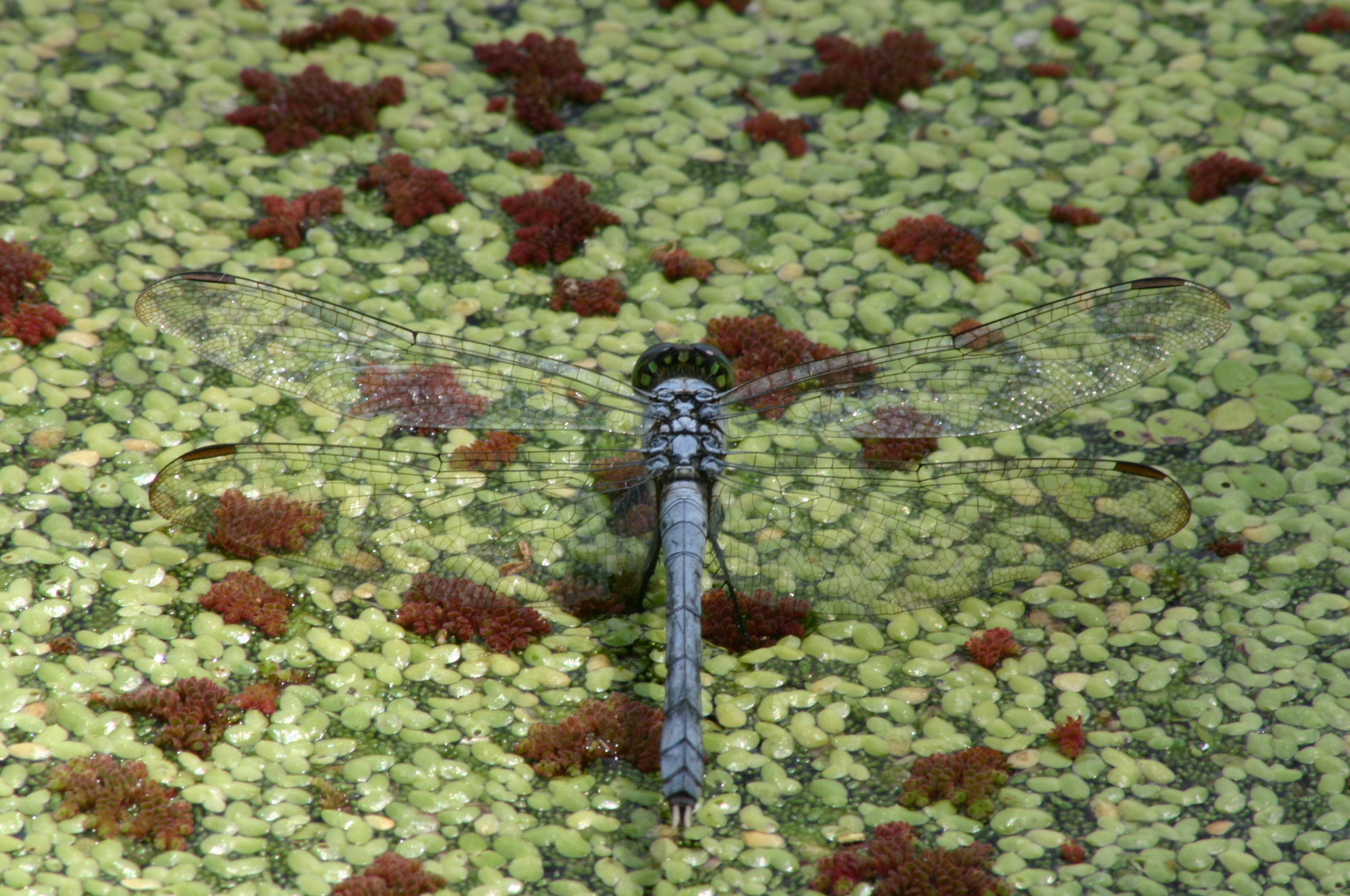
A male eastern pondhawk (Erythemis simplicicollis) in Elm Lake.

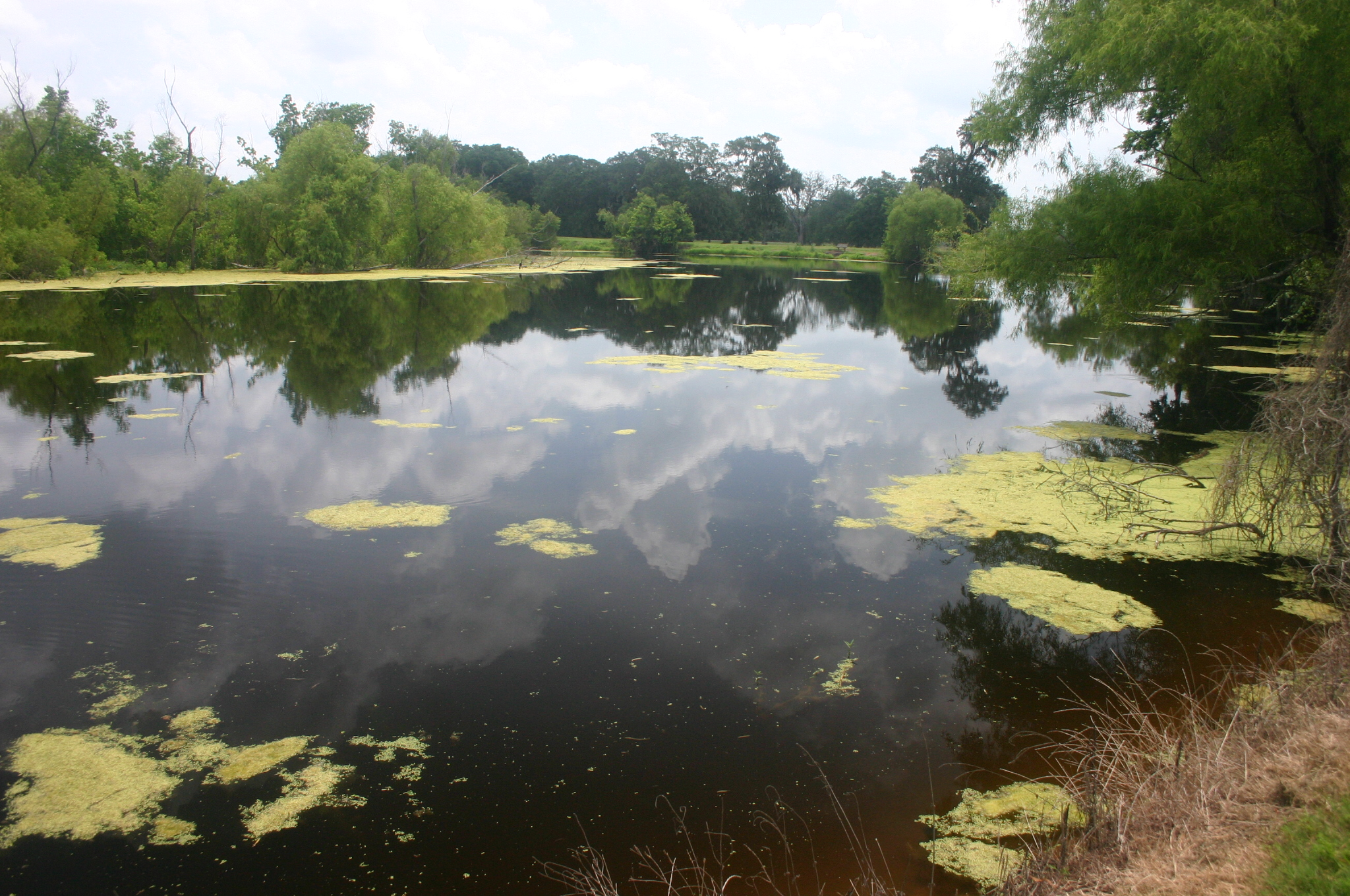
Horseshoe Lake with reflection of clouds.

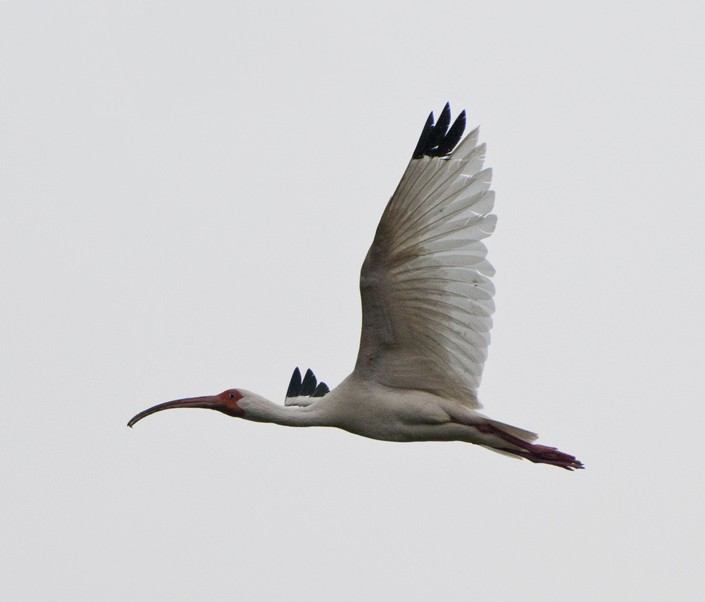
An American White Ibis flying at Brazos Bend State Park, July 2010.

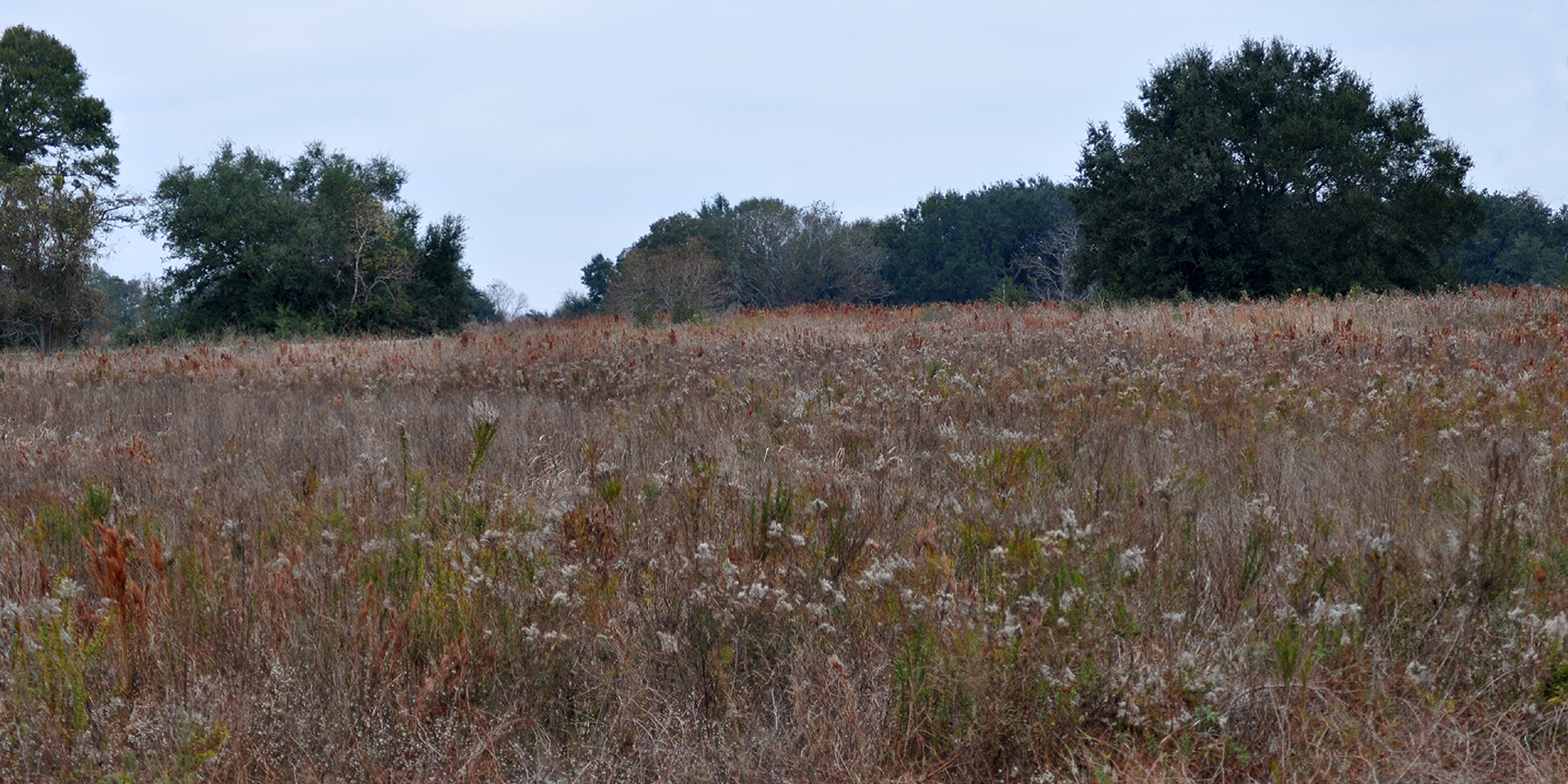
Prairies of the Western Gulf coastal grasslands dominate the higher elevations in the western third of the park.

== See also ==
- List of Texas state parks
