= Oswaldo Lezama =

Colombian mathematician (born 1956)

José Oswaldo Lezama Serrano
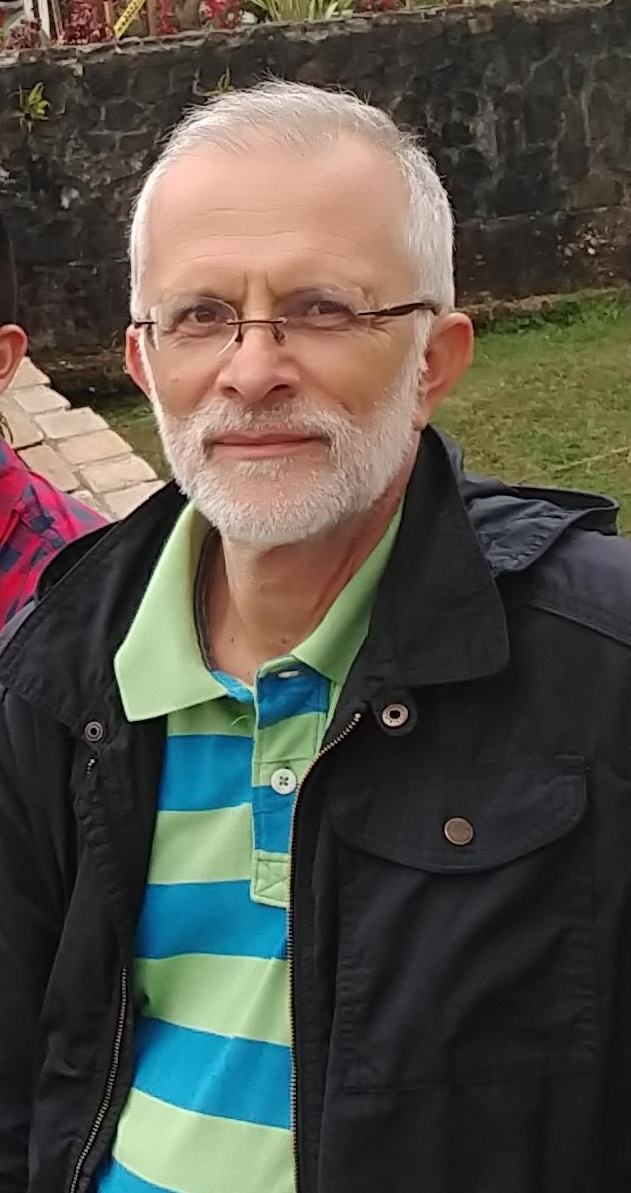
- José Oswaldo Lezama Serrano
- Born: 12 August 1956 (age 69); Bucaramanga, Colombia
- Education: B.Sc. 1978, Ph.D. 1983
- Alma mater: Saint Petersburg State University
- Awards: Medalla al Mérito of the National University of Colombia (2001); Premio Nacional de Matemáticas of the Colombian Mathematical Society (2017); Fellow of the Colombian Mathematical Society (since 1986)
- Scientific career
- Fields: Abstract algebra
- Institutions: National University of Colombia
- Thesis: The Group of the Invertible Elements of a Semiperfect Ring (1983)
- Doctoral advisor: Zenon Ivanovich Borevich
- Website: sites.google.com/a/unal.edu.co/sac2/

José Oswaldo Lezama Serrano (born 1956) is a Colombian mathematician who researches abstract algebra and specializes in noncommutative algebra. Lezama graduated from the UIS in 1978 with a B.Sc. in Mathematical Education and obtained a PhD in 1983 under the supervision of Zenon Ivanovich Borevich from the Saint Petersburg State University. Since 1985 Lezama was a full professor at the National University of Colombia; he retired in 2020.

== Early life and education ==
Lezama was born in Bucaramanga, Colombia. He studied at the Industrial University of Santander obtaining in 1978 a B.Sc. in Mathematical Education with a Cum Laude mention. In 1976 Lezama received a scholarship to study in the Saint Petersburg State University as part of an agreement between the governments of Colombia and the USSR. His Ph.D. supervisor was Zenon Ivanovich Borevich and the work was titled ″The Group of the Invertible Elements of a Semiperfect Ring″. He obtained the title in 1983.

In 1984 he came back to Bucaramanga and started working as professor in the Industrial University of Santander. The next year he moved to Bogotá and since then has worked as full professor at the National University of Colombia. He held this position until 2020, year in which he retired. In 1993, Lezama received the TWAS Scholarship (Third World Academy of Sciences) as visitant professor in Trieste, Italy. That same year he also visited the University of Buenos Aires and the Instituto Argentino de Matemática under the financial support of CONICET and the second mentioned institute.

== Career ==
Since his return to Colombia, Lezama has had a very active participation in the mathematical community, taking part in national and international events as attendant, speaker and organizer. Between 1986 and 1991 started a research seminar on rings, modules and categories. As a result, in 1994 he published with the mathematician Gilma de Villamarín a book called ″Anillos Módulos y Categorías″. Until 2002 he also hosted a seminar in commutative algebra, called SAC (″Seminario de Álgebra Conmutativa″, in Spanish).

With time his interest in noncommutative algebra grew until the mentioned seminar changed its name to SAC2 (″Seminario de Álgebra Constructiva″, in Spanish) and the research in such matter started. The first aboarded topics were noncommutative Gröbner basis and homological properties of noncommutative rings. In 2011, with his doctoral student Claudia Gallego, published for the first time the concept of skew PBW extension, which with time became his main topic of research.

In 2017 Lezama received the National Award of the Colombian Mathematical Society, being the most notorious recognition of the country in the area. In 2018 he received public attention when he published in several media an opinion article about the candidature of Sergio Fajardo to the presidency of Colombia.

In 2020, coinciding with his year of retirement of the National University of Colombia, a book called ″Skew PBW Extensions″ was published in the editorial Springer summarizing the results obtained by Lezama and colleagues/students among the years. Another notorious written work of Lezama are the called ″Cuadernos de Álgebra″ consisting on ten monographies (in Spanish) covering the basic topics of undergraduate and graduate abstract algebra, including Galois theory, algebraic geometry and homological algebra.

== Selected writings ==
- Zariski cancellation problem for non-domain noncommutative algebras (2017), with Yi Wang and James Zhang
- Extended modules and Ore extensions (2015), with Vyacheslav Artamonov and William Fajardo
- Some homological properties of skew PBW extensions (2013), with Armando Reyes
- Gröbner bases for ideals of σ-PBW extensions (2011), with Claudia Gallego
- Cuadernos de álgebra
