= Yu Takeuchi =

Colombian mathematician (1927–2014)

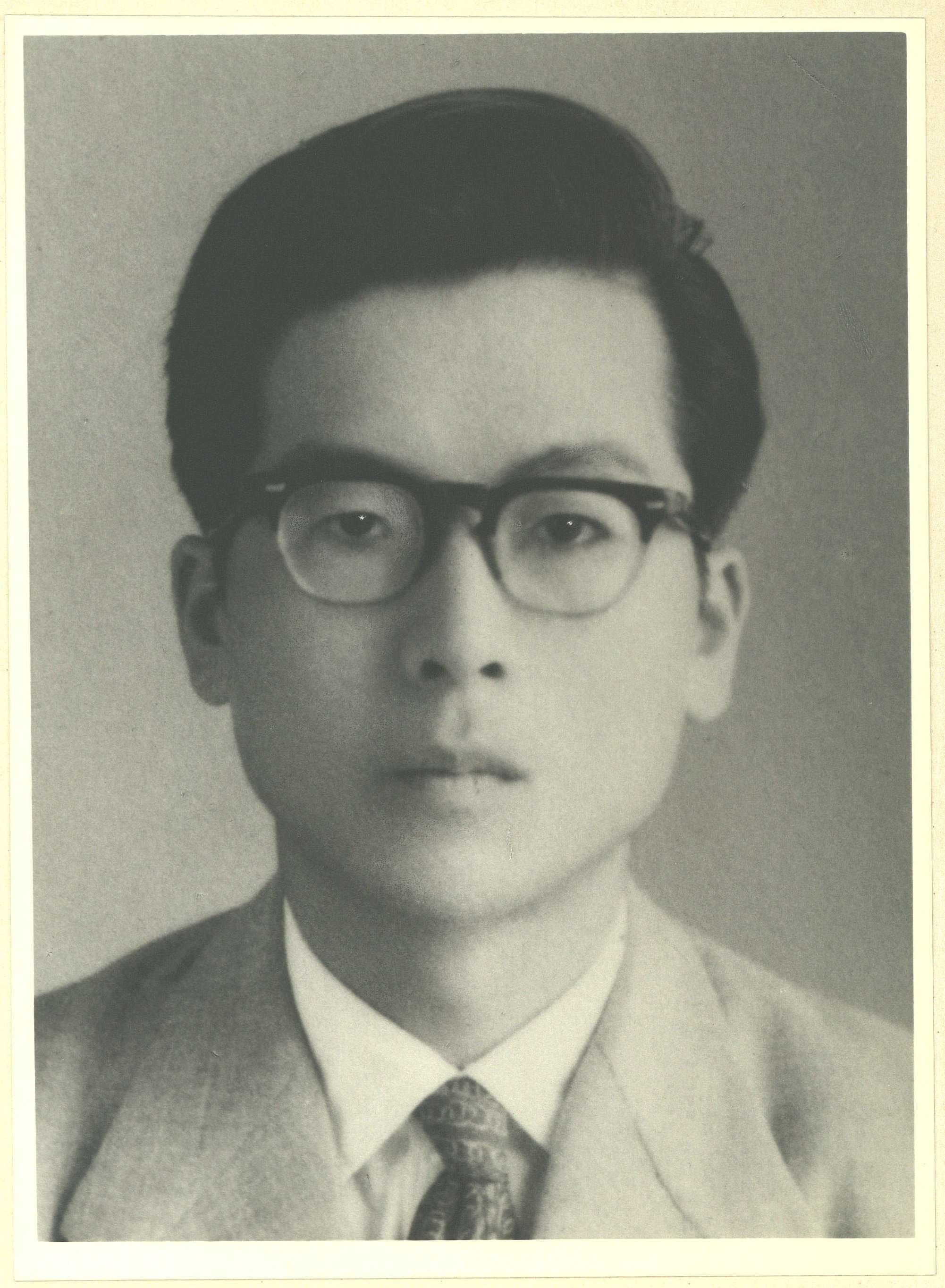
- Born: March 16, 1927; Tokyo, Empire of Japan
- Died: December 25, 2014 (aged 87); Colombia Bogotá, Colombia
- Occupations: Physicist, Mathematician
- Spouse: Shizu Takeuchi
- Children: Yuri Takeuchi Caori Takeuchi Noboru Takeuchi

Yu Takeuchi (竹内 悠, Takeuchi Yū) (16 March 1927, Tokyo – 25 December 2014, Bogotá) was a Colombian nationalized Japanese physicist and mathematician, teacher and promoter of mathematics in Colombia.

== Biography ==
Takeuchi studied theoretical physics at the Imperial University of Tokyo (now University of Tokyo) and was a professor at the Ibaraki University. He arrived in Colombia through a cultural exchange program sponsored by the National University of Colombia and the Japanese government in 1959, and he would go on to teach at the university until 1989. Along with five other Japanese professors, Takeuchi arrived in Colombia, entering through Buenaventura, without knowing how to speak Spanish. The hiring process was arranged by the Japanese embassy. His selection was made from a pool of 30 teachers, as Ramón García Piment indicated in an interview with UN Radio.

Although Takeuchi graduated as a physicist due to family influence, his interest was to learn and teach mathematics. He taught courses on vector analysis, calculus, and sequences, with the latter being his main interest. He is known for being the founder of the magazine Matemáticas: Enseñanza Universitaria and was part of the first class of the master's degree in mathematics at the National University of Colombia in 1972.

According to Ignacio Mantilla, a former student of Yu Takeuchi and former rector of the National University of Colombia, in the event commemorating 100 years of relations between Colombia and Japan in 2008, Takeuchi was recognized as the most influential Japanese figure in Colombia. Since 2016, the Takeuchi family and the Colombian Academy of Exact, Physical, and Natural Sciences have awarded the Yu Takeuchi Prize in honor and memory of him.

== Educator ==
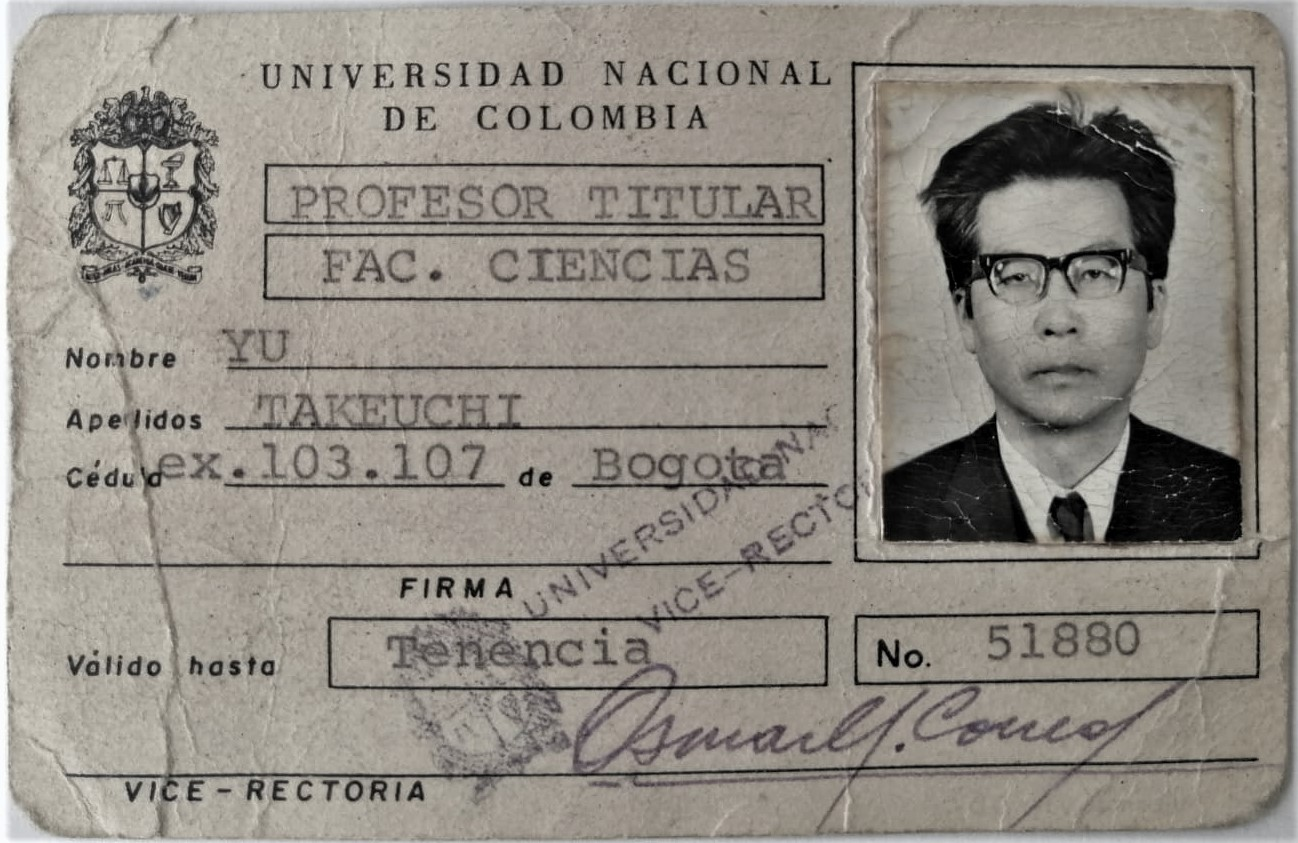
Card as professor of the Faculty of Sciences of the National University of Colombia in the year 1959.

Since he started working as a teacher in Colombia, Takeuchi became very aware of the backwardness and lack of updating of mathematics in the country and the need to train teachers at all levels of education. Therefore, he also dedicated himself to traveling throughout the national territory, disseminating Modern Mathematics through seminars, workshops, and collaborations of all kinds.

== Printing press ==
By the 1960s, many students at the Faculty of Sciences of the National University of Colombia did not have the economic resources to acquire textbooks, few of which were in Spanish. Takeuchi knew of this difficulty, so he had a printing press in the garage of his house, where with the collaboration of his wife and children, he produced various hand-made and low-cost texts that were easily accessible to the university community. According to the professor, his greatest desire was to transmit mathematical knowledge at all costs, which Colombia lacked in those years.

Iván Castro Chadid, a close colleague of Takeuchi, remembers:

Actually, this was what he did with his publications as he himself stated: "I wrote texts for everyone, seeking the popularization of mathematics." Usually, these books were made up of 60 paragraphs, so that each paragraph corresponds to a one-hour lesson, adapted to the teaching of a subject over a whole semester. The criterion that guided him, according to his own words, was the following: "Today, when time seems to be getting shorter and research fields are becoming ever larger, practical books that are economically within everyone's reach, of good academic level, and with topics selected with the future in mind, that truly help the student, are necessary. I present texts that meet these conditions and needs."

== Recognitions ==
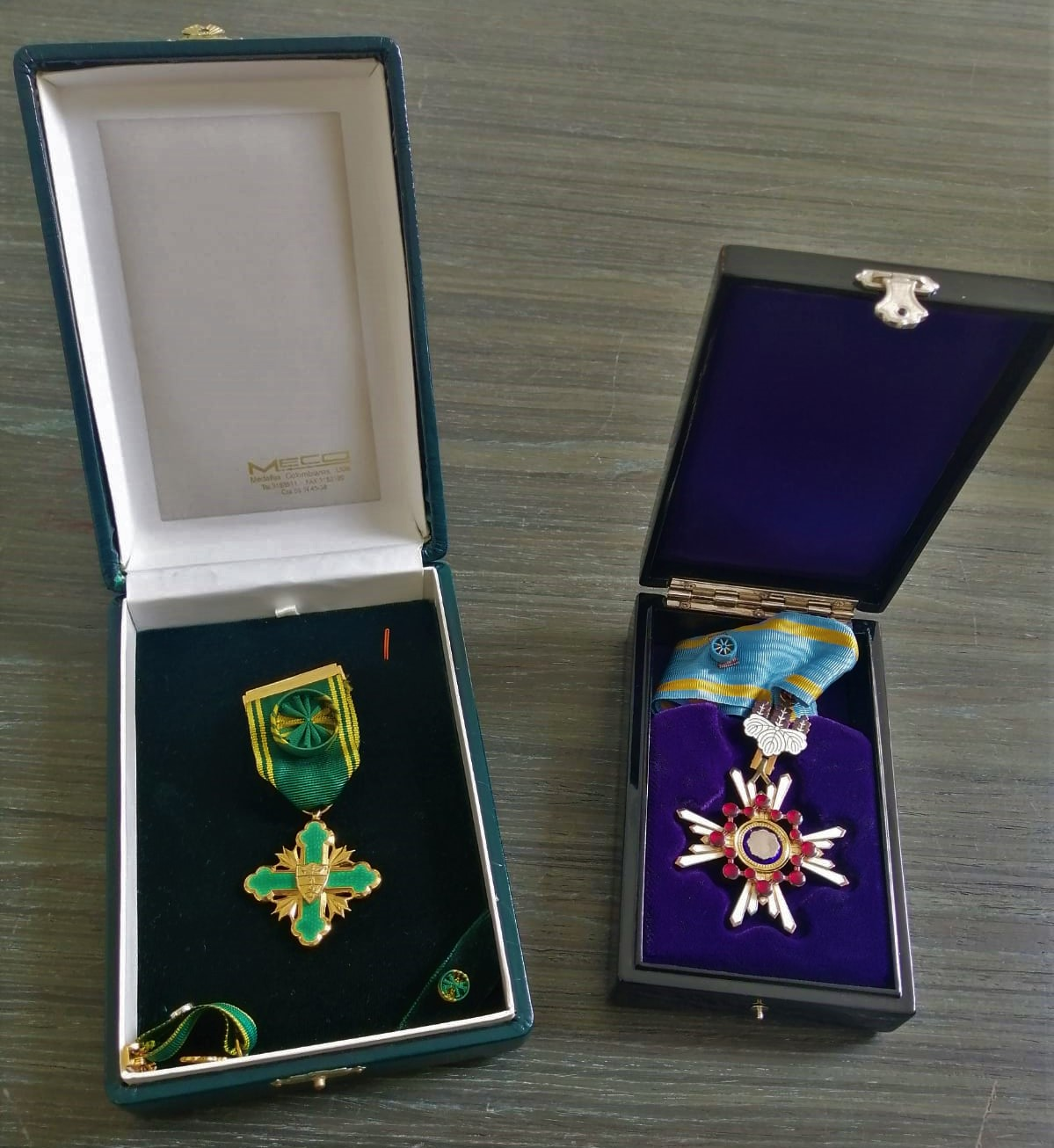
Medal of the Order of San Carlos (Colombia) and Medal of the Order of the Sacred Treasure (Japan), which belonged to Professor Yu Takeuchi. They are currently held at the Historical Central Archive of the National University of Colombia.

Among the most important distinctions received by Professor Takeuchi are the following:

- Emeritus Professor of the National University of Colombia in 1979
- Honorary Professor of the Javeriana University in 1985
- Honorary Professor of the National University of Colombia in 1995
- Honorary Professor of the Universidad Popular del Cesar in 1996

In 1989 Takeuchi won the Premio Nacional de Matemáticas of the Colombian Mathematical Society. In 2008, he was awarded the Medal of the Order of San Carlos and the Medal of the Order of the Sacred Treasure by Colombia and Japan respectively, for his achievements in mathematical education. In 2010, he became a Colombian national.
