= Colombian Mathematical Society =

Mathematical society in Colombia

- Sociedad Colombiana de Matemáticas
- Abbreviation: SCM
- Formation: 10 August 1955; 70 years ago
- Type: Mathematical society
- Headquarters: Bogotá
- Location: Colombia
- President: Sofía Pinzón
- Awards: National Mathematics Award; José Celestino Mutis Prize; José Fernando Escobar Prize
- Website: https://scm.org.co

The Colombian Mathematical Society (Spanish: Sociedad Colombiana de Matemáticas, SCM) is an organisation founded in 1955 to promote the development of mathematics teaching and research in Colombia, and is the main professional society of Colombian mathematicians. It has two publications, the Colombian Journal of Mathematics and Lecturas Matemáticas, and awards three prizes: the National Mathematics Award, the José Celestino Mutis Prize, and the José Fernando Escobar Prize.

The Colombian Mathematical Society is based in Bogotá, and is a member of the Unión Matemática de América Latina y el Caribe. It is recognised by the International Mathematics Union.

== History ==
The Colombian Mathematical Society was founded at a meeting in the home of Julio Carrizosa Valenzuela on 10 August 1955. Carrizosa Valenzuela had been greatly influenced by two European mathematicians, Carlo Federici Casa and János Horváth (known in Colombia as Juan Horváth), who were working in Bogotá at the time. He felt the need to modernise Colombian mathematics and develop it as a subject independent of engineering.

The founding members of the society were (in alphabetical order):

- Jorge Acosta Villaveces (1891–1965)
- Julio Carrizosa Valenzuela (1895–1974)
- Pablo Casas Santofimio (1928–1983)
- Guillermo Castillo Torres (1923–2000)
- Carlo Federici Casa (1906–2004)
- Luis de Greiff Bravo (1908–1967)
- Otto de Greiff (1903–1995)
- Leopoldo Guerra Portocarrero (1911–1964)
- Juan Horváth (1924–2015)
- Jose Ignacio Nieto (1930)
- Luis Ignacio Soriano (1903–1973)
- Antonio María Gómez (1913–1973)
- Luciano Mora Osejo (1928–2016)
- Dario Rozo (1881–1964)
- Gustavo Perry Zubieta (1912–1986)
- Gabriel Poveda Ramos (1931–2022)
- Michel Valero (1928–2008)
- Erwin von der Walde (1927–2016)
- Henry Yerly (1901–1984)

The society initially had two governing statutes, and Carrizosa served as the first president.

== Activities ==
The Colombian Mathematical Society organises the Colombian Mathematics Congress (Spanish: Congreso Colombiano de Matemáticas) every two years, in association with various academic institutions in Colombia.

=== Commissions ===
The SCM supports three commissions with specific goals.

- The Mathematics Education and Dissemination Commission (Spanish: Comisión de Educación y Divulgación Matemática) aims to improve mathematics education at every level in Colombia.
- The Equity and Gender Commission (Spanish: Comisión de Equidad y Género) aims to increase the participation and visibility of women in mathematics in Colombia, and to cooperate with other national and international organisations with similar goals.
- The Applied and Industrial Mathematics Commission Comisión de Matemáticas Aplicadas e Industriales) was established in 2019 to promote applied mathematics in Colombia and to create an intellectual community of interested professionals and students. It organises the Colombian Applied and Industrial Mathematics Conference (Spanish: Conferencias Colombianas de Matemáticas Aplicadas e Industriales, MAPI).

== Publications ==
The Colombian Mathematical Society has two publications.

- The Colombian Journal of Mathematics (Spanish: Revista Colombiana de Matemáticas) is published in partnership with the National University of Colombia. It was founded by Juan Horváth in 1952, and was named Revista de Matemáticas Elementales until 1967. The journal is indexed by Mathematical Reviews and zbMATH. It has a 2022 CiteScore of 0.8 and a SCImago Journal Rank of 0.2.
- Lecturas Matemáticas is published in partnership with the University of Los Andes. It is the official newsletter of the SCM, and is intended to be accessible to any reader interested in mathematics.

=== Past publications ===
From its inception in March 1967 to 1979 the journal Boletín de Matemáticas was jointly published by the SCM and the mathematics department of the National University of Colombia; since 1980 it is solely published by the latter. In 1975 the SCM and the mathematics department of the National University of Colombia created the journal Notas de Matemáticas, which focused on mathematics teaching. It is no longer published.

== Prizes ==
The Colombian Mathematical Society manages three mathematical prizes, which are awarded at meetings of the Colombian Mathematics Congress.

=== The National Mathematics Award ===
The National Mathematics Award (Spanish: Premio Nacional de Matemáticas) is awarded to a mathematician who has "excelled in their professional work and made a fundamental contribution to the development of mathematics in [Colombia]." Past recipients of the prize are:

- Yu Takeuchi (1989)
- Jairo Charris Castañeda (1990)
- Alonso Takahashi Orozco (1991)
- Guillermo Restrepo Sierra (1992)
- Carlos Ruiz Salguero (1993)
- Xavier Caicedo (2005)
- Víctor Albis González (2007)
- Jorge Cossio (2009)
- José Raul Quintero (2011)
- Alfonso Castro (2013)
- Pedro Isaza (2015)
- José Oswaldo Lezama (2017)
- Federico Ardila (2019)
- Carlos Alberto Trujillo and Bernardo Uribe Jongbloed (2023)

=== The José Celestino Mutis Prize ===
The José Celestino Mutis Prize (Spanish: Premio José Celestino Mutis) is awarded to a teacher of mathematics who has "excelled in their professional work and made a fundamental contribution to the development of mathematics in [Colombia]." Past recipients of the prize are:

- María Falk de Losada (2011)
- Jesús Hernando Pérez (2013)
- Carlos Eduardo Vasco (2015)
- Alberto Campos Sánchez (2017)
- Myriam Caicedo (2019)
- Publio Suárez Sotomonte (2023)

=== The José Fernando Escobar Prize ===
The José Fernando Escobar Prize (Spanish: Premio José Fernando Escobar) is awarded to a mathematician who has "excelled in their research in pure or applied mathematics, through the achievement of exceptional published results." Past recipients of the prize are:

- Mauricio Fernando Velasco Gregory (2017)
- Juan Carlos Galvis (2019)
- Elder Villamizar (2025)

== Governance ==
=== Presidents ===
The Society has had 17 presidents.

- Julio Carrizosa Valenzuela, 1955–1975
- Gustavo Perry Zubieta, 1957–1963
- Carlos Lemoine Amaya, 1963–1967
- Ricardo Losada Márquez, 1967–1968
- Jaime Lesmes Camacho, 1968–1970, 1983–1987
- Otto Raul Ruiz, 1970–1971
- Jairo Charris Castañeda, 1971–1973
- Carlos Ruiz Salguero, 1973–1975
- Alonso Takahashi Orozco, 1975–1983
- Myriam Muñoz de Ozac, 1987–1990
- Víctor Albis González, 1990–1993
- Ernesto Acosta Gempeler, 1993–1998
- Leonardo Rendón, 1998–2003
- Carlos H. Montenegro, 2003–2017
- Bernardo Uribe, 2017–2020
- Alf Onshuus, 2020–2023
- Sofía Pinzón, 2023–present

=== Statutes ===
On 13 May 1999 the statutes of the Society were reformed, increasing in number from two to 43. The statutes defining the name and purpose of the society are as follows.

Article 1. The Sociedad Colombiana de Matemáticas (SCM) (Colombian Mathematical Society) is an entity of scientific and cultural nature, non-profit, with legal status, having its own assets and whose domicile is the city of Bogotá.

Article 2. The Society is intended to promote the development of Mathematics in the country and its specific aims are:

1. Encourage research and improvement of teaching in mathematics.
2. Serve as a link between mathematicians and mathematics teachers.
3. Organise events and programmes that promote the development of Mathematics.
4. Ensure the achievement and improvement of conditions of people dedicated to the cultivation of Mathematics in its diverse areas, as well as those involved in its teaching and dissemination.

Article 3. In accordance with its aims, the Society may:

1. Collaborate with other bodies in matters of common interest.
2. Establish sections in other parts of the country.

== See also ==
- List of mathematical societies
