= Ernesto Lupercio =

Mexican mathematician

Ernesto Lupercio is a Mexican mathematician. He was awarded the ICTP Ramanujan Prize in 2009, "for his outstanding contributions to algebraic topology, geometry and mathematical physics."

Lupercio earned a Ph.D. from Stanford University in 1997 under the guidance of Ralph L. Cohen. He was a member of the Global Young Academy (2011-2016) and a member of the Third World Academy of Sciences.

== Selected publications ==
- Lupercio, Ernesto; Uribe, Bernardo (2004), "Gerbes over orbifolds and twisted K-theory", Communications in Mathematical Physics, 245 (3): 449–489, arXiv:math/0105039, doi:10.1007/s00220-003-1035-x
- de Fernex, Tommaso; Lupercio, Ernesto; Nevins, Thomas; Uribe, Bernardo (30 January 2007), "Stringy Chern classes of singular varieties", Advances in Mathematics, 208 (2): 597–621, arXiv:math/0407314, doi:10.1016/j.aim.2006.03.005
- Lupercio, Ernesto; Poddar, Mainak (July 2004), "The global McKay–Ruan correspondence via motivic integration", Bulletin of the London Mathematical Society, 36 (4): 509–515, arXiv:math/0308200, doi:10.1112/S002460930300290X
