= EButterfly =

eButterfly
- Website type: Citizen science
- Available in: English and French
- Website: www.e-butterfly.org
- Commercial: No
- Registration: required
- Launched: 2012; 14 years ago
- Current status: Online

eButterfly is an online database of butterfly observations that collects data on butterfly abundance, distribution and phenology across North America. Naturalists, entomologists and other citizen scientists contribute observations in checklist form and the aggregated information is available through mapping and queries tools on eButterfly. eButterfly has a vetting system where a group of regional experts review submissions to ensure that the quality of data remains high. Photos can be added to any observation and eButterfly supports life lists and photo libraries for users.

Observations can be entered directly to the eButterfly website. As of September 2015, eButterfly users have contributed over 225,000 observations.

== History ==
eButterfly was launched in 2012 by Max Larrivée and Jeremy Kerr of the University of Ottawa. The project began as an effort to track changing butterfly ranges in Canada to determine how climate change may be impacting butterfly distribution in the country. It expanded to cover the U.S. in 2013 after partnering with Kent McFarland of Vermont Center for Ecostudies and Kathleen Prudic of Oregon State University.

== Participation ==
Members of the eButterfly community enter butterfly sightings as part of regular surveys, organized butterfly counts or as incidental observations. There are checklists for each state and province, and entries can be made with or without photos.

== Research based on eButterfly observations ==
A 2018 study of over 100,000 Canadian butterfly observations submitted to eButterfly noted that 5 species of butterfly that were new to Canada were reported via eButterfly. The authors also noted that by combining amateur data from eButterfly with traditional research data, the result was an improved understanding of butterfly distribution and density in Canada.

== See also ==
- Butterfly count
- List of citizen science projects
