= Zenon Borevich =

Russian mathematician (1922–1995)

- Born: Russian SFSR
- Education: Saint Petersburg State University
- Scientific career
- Fields: Mathematics
- Doctoral advisor: Dmitry Faddeev
- Doctoral students: Oswaldo Lezama; Sergei Vostokov

Zenon Ivanovich Borevich Зенон Иванович Боревич (7 November 1922 – 26 February 1995) was a Russian mathematician who worked on homological algebra, algebraic number theory, integral representations, and linear groups.

== Biography ==
Zenon Borevich completed his master's thesis titled "Regarding the theory of local fields" in 1951 and his doctoral dissertation titled "Regarding the multiplicative groups of normal R-extensions of local fields" in 1967.

In 1968, Borevich became Professor of Mathematics at Saint Petersburg State University (then named Leningrad State University) and was put in charge of the Department of Higher Algebra and Number Theory. He became Dean of the university's entire Department of Mathematics and Mechanics in 1973 and remained in that position until 1984. He continued to head up Higher Algebra and Number Theory until his retirement in 1992.

Borevich authored more than 100 publications and works, including the textbook "Determinants and Matrices" and the monograph "Number Theory" (together with Shafarevich).

== Publications ==
- Borevich, Z. I.; Shafarevich, Igor R. (1966), Number theory, Pure and Applied Mathematics, vol. 20, Boston, MA: Academic Press, ISBN 978-0-12-117850-5, MR 0195803
