= Bernardo Uribe =

Colombian mathematician (born 1975)

- Born: 1975 (age 50–51)
- Education: Universidad de Los Andes; University of Wisconsin-Madison
- Scientific career
- Fields: Topology
- Thesis: Twisted K-Theory and Orbifold Cohomology of the Symmetric Product (2002)
- Doctoral advisor: Alejandro Ádem

Bernardo Uribe Jongbloed (born 1975) is a Colombian mathematician. Uribe's research deals with algebraic geometry and topology with string theory applications.

== Biography ==
Uribe graduated from secondary school in Bogotá and then studied from 1994 to 1998 at the Universidad de Los Andes. In 2002 he received his PhD from the University of Wisconsin-Madison with thesis Twisted K-Theory and Orbifold Cohomology of the Symmetric Product under the supervision of Alejandro Ádem and Yongbin Ruan. He was a postdoc at the Max Planck Institute for Mathematics in Bonn. In 2003/04 he was an assistant professor at the University of Michigan. He taught as a professor at the Universidad Nacional de Colombia and as a full professor from 2012 to 2014 at Bogotá's Universidad de los Andes. Since 2014 has been a professor at the Universidad del Norte in Barranquilla. In 2008/09 he was a visiting scholar in Mexico City. In 2010 he worked with Wolfgang Lück at the University of Münster.

== Honors and awards ==
In 2012 he received a Humboldt Research Award, with which he was at the University of Bonn.

Uribe received the Mathematics Prize of the Third World Academy of Sciences in 2012. In 2018 he was an invited speaker with talk The evenness conjecture in equivariant unitary bordism at the International Congress of Mathematicians in Rio de Janeiro. From July 2017 to June 2019 he was President of the Colombian Mathematical Society.

== Selected publications ==
- with Ernesto Lupercio: Gerbes over orbifolds and twisted K-theory, Communications in Mathematical Physics, vol. 245, 2004, pp. 449–489 doi:10.1007/s00220-003-1035-x
- with Ernesto Lupercio: Loop groupoids, gerbes, and twisted sectors on orbifolds, 2001, Arxiv
- Orbifold cohomology of the symmetric product, 2001, Arxiv
- with Lupercio: An introduction to Gerbes on Orbifolds, Annales Mathématiques Blaise Pascal, Arxiv 2004
- de Fernex, Tommaso; Lupercio, Ernesto; Nevins, Thomas; Uribe, Bernardo (2007). "Stringy Chern classes of singular varieties". Advances in Mathematics. 208 (2): 597–621. arXiv:math/0407314. doi:10.1016/j.aim.2006.03.005. MR 2304329.
- Lupercio, Ernesto; Uribe, Bernardo; Xicotencatl, Miguel A. (2008). "Orbifold string topology". Geometry & Topology. 12 (4): 2203–2247. arXiv:math/0512658. doi:10.2140/gt.2008.12.2203. MR 2431019.
