= Order of San Carlos =

Colombian state order

Order of San Carlos Orden de San Carlos
- Cross of the Order of San Carlos

Awarded by Colombia
- Awarded for: Exceptional service to Colombia
- Status: Currently constituted
- Grand Master: President of Colombia
- Grand Chancellor: Minister of Foreign Affairs
- Chancellor: Director of Protocol
- Grades: Collar, Grand Cross with Gold Badge, Grand Cross, Grand Officer, Commander, Officer, Knight

Precedence
- Next (higher): Order of Boyaca
- Next (lower): Medalla Servicios en "Guerra Internacional"
- Ribbon bar of the Order of San Carlos

The Order of San Carlos is a state order granted by Colombia. The order was founded 16 August 1954 to honor Colombian citizens and foreign civilians and military officers who have made outstanding contributions to the nation of Colombia, especially in the field of international relations.

== Grades ==
- Collar (Collar)
- Grand Cross with Gold Badge (Gran Cruz con Placa de Oro)
- Grand Cross (Gran Cruz)
- Grand Officer (Gran Oficial)
- Commander (Comendador)
- Officer (Oficial)
- Knight (Caballero)

Ribbon bars of the Order of San Carlos
Grand Collar	Grand Cross/Grand Cross with Gold Badge	Grand Officer
Commander	Officer	Knight

== Notable recipients ==
- (France) Jean-Michel Blanquer
- Queen Juliana of the Netherlands
- (Cuba) Eusebio Leal Spengler
- (Germany) Klaus Müller-Leiendecker
- (Republic of Ireland) Smurfit Kappa
- (Colombia) Gustavo Vasco Muñoz
- (Turkey) Engin Yürür
- (Spain) Agustín Díaz de Mera
- (Japan) Yu Takeuchi
- (Colombia) Cristián Samper
- (United States) Condoleezza Rice
- United States Southern Command
- (Germany) Joybrato Mukherjee
- (United States) Raymond L. Williams
