= B. Mario Pinto =

Canadian chemical biologist and academic

Dr. B. Mario Pinto is a Canadian chemical biologist, academic and the former President of the Natural Sciences and Engineering Research Council of Canada (NSERC). Prior to his appointment at NSERC, Pinto served as a chemistry professor and as the Vice-President of Research at Simon Fraser University. He is a fellow of the Royal Society of Canada, Chemical Institute of Canada and the American Chemical Society.

He resigned as president of NSERC on September 21, 2018.

He was appointed Deputy Vice Chancellor (Research) of Griffith University, Brisbane, Australia, on October 3, 2019, to commence in February 2020.

== Education ==
Pinto received his undergraduate degree and doctorate from Queen's University in Ontario. He completed his post-doctoral work at the Centre national de la recherche scientifique in France and the National Research Council of Canada in Ottawa. Pinto has published over 225 papers.

== Awards and honours ==
- Horace S. Isbell Award from the American Chemical Society in 1992
- CSC Bernard Belleau Award in 2002
- Elected to the Academy of Sciences of the Royal Society of Canada in 2003
- R.U. Lemieux Award in 2012
- Alfred Bader Award in 2013
- Montreal Medal in 2014 awarded for his "outstanding contribution to the profession of chemistry or chemical engineering in Canada."
