= Yongbin Ruan =

Chinese mathematician (born 1963)

- Born: February 14, 1963
- Education: Sichuan University (BS, MS); University of California, Berkeley (PhD)
- Scientific career
- Thesis: Gauge Theory and Its Applications to Riemannian Geometry
- Doctoral students: Bernardo Uribe

Yongbin Ruan (Chinese: 阮勇斌; pinyin: Ruǎn Yǒngbīn; born 14 February 1963) is a Chinese mathematician, specializing in algebraic geometry, differential geometry, and symplectic geometry with applications to string theory.

Ruan studied from 1978 at Sichuan University with Benke Certificate of graduation followed by a master's degree in 1985. In 1985/86 he was a teaching assistant at the University of Wisconsin–Madison. In 1991 he received his Ph.D. from the University of California, Berkeley with thesis Gauge theory and its applications to Riemannian Geometry under the supervision of Robion Kirby (and Tomasz Mrowka). As a postdoctoral researcher he was at Michigan State University. In 1993 he became an assistant professor at the University of Utah. At the University of Wisconsin–Madison he became in 1995 an associate professor and in 1999 a full professor. Since 2006 he is a professor at the University of Michigan.

He has been a visiting professor at the ETH Zurich, in Hong Kong, and at MIT. He was in 1993 and again in 2004 at the Institut des hautes études scientifiques, in 1993 at the Max Planck Institute for Mathematics, in 1994 at Cambridge's Isaac Newton Institute, and in 1994 at the Mathematical Sciences Research Institute.

In 1998 he was an Invited Speaker with talk Quantum Cohomology and its Applications at the International Congress of Mathematicians in Berlin. From 1995 to 1997 he was a Sloan Research Fellow. He became a Fellow of the American Mathematical Society in the class of 2015.

== Selected publications ==
- Adem, Alejandro; Leida, Johann; Ruan, Yongbin (2007). Orbifolds and Stringy Topology. Cambridge: Cambridge University Press. doi:10.1017/cbo9780511543081. ISBN 978-0-511-54308-1. MR 2359514.
- Ruan, Yongbin (2006), "The cohomology ring of crepant resolutions of orbifolds", Gromov-Witten Theory of Spin Curves and Orbifolds, Contemporary Mathematics, vol. 403, Providence, Rhode Island: American Mathematical Society, pp. 117–126, arXiv:math/0108195, doi:10.1090/conm/403/07597, ISBN 978-0-8218-3534-0, ISSN 1098-3627, MR 2234886, S2CID 15513461
- Chen, Weimin; Ruan, Yongbin (2004). "A new cohomology theory of orbifold". Communications in Mathematical Physics. 248 (1): 1–31. arXiv:math/0004129. Bibcode:2004CMaPh.248....1C. doi:10.1007/s00220-004-1089-4. MR 2104605. S2CID 6950979.
- with W. Chen: Orbifold Gromov-Witten theory. Orbifolds in mathematics and physics (Madison, WI, 2001), 25–85, Contemp. Math., 310, Amer. Math. Soc., Providence, RI, 2002
- with A. Li: Symplectic surgery and Gromov-Witten invariants of Calabi-Yau 3-folds. Invent. Math. 145 (2001), no. 1, 151–218.
- with Gang Tian: Higher genus symplectic invariants and sigma models coupled with gravity, Inventiones Mathematicae, vol. 130, 1997, pp. 455–516. arXiv preprint
- Topological sigma model and Donaldson type invariants in Gromov theory, Duke Mathematical Journal, vol. 83, 1996, pp. 63–98 doi:10.1215/S0012-7094-96-08316-7
- with Gang Tian: A mathematical theory of quantum cohomology, Journal of Differential Geometry, vol. 42, 1995, pp. 259–367
- Stringy geometry and topology of orbifolds, Contemporary Mathematics, vol. 312, arXiv preprint
