= Raymond L. Williams =

American Hispanic studies scholar and writer

- Born: Raymond Leslie Williams; March 9, 1950 (age 76); Oregon City, Oregon, U.S.
- Education: University of Kansas; Washington State University
- Occupations: Hispanic studies scholar, writer

Raymond Leslie Williams (born March 9, 1950) is an American Hispanic studies scholar and writer. A recipient of the Order of San Carlos, he is a distinguished professor in the department of Hispanic studies at the University of California, Riverside.

== Books ==
- The Twentieth-Century Spanish American Novel
- The Colombian Novel 1844–1987
- The Writing of Carlos Fuentes
- Mario Vargas Llosa
- Una década de la novela colombiana: la experiencia de los, setenta
