= Natural Sciences and Engineering Research Council of Canada =

Canadian granting body (Tri-council)

- Conseil de recherches en sciences naturelles et en génie du Canada

Agency overview
- Formed: May 1, 1978; 48 years ago
- Jurisdiction: Government of Canada
- Headquarters: 125 Zaida Eddy Private, 2nd Floor, Unit 2, Ottawa, Ontario, K1R 0E3 Canada; 45°25′14.5″N 75°43′02.1″W
- Employees: 350 (approximately)
- Annual budget: CA$ 1.3 billion (2023; Program Investments)
- Minister responsible: Hon. Mélanie Joly, Minister of Industry
- Agency executive: Alejandro Adem, President
- Parent department: Innovation, Science and Economic Development Canada
- Website: www.nserc-crsng.gc.ca

The Natural Sciences and Engineering Research Council of Canada (NSERC; French: Conseil de recherches en sciences naturelles et en génie du Canada, CRSNG) is a federal agency responsible for funding natural sciences and engineering research in Canada. NSERC directly funds university professors and students as well as Canadian companies to perform research and training.

With funding from the Government of Canada, NSERC supports the research of over 41,000 students, trainees and professors at universities and colleges in Canada. Alejandro Adem was appointed president in 2019 and reappointed for a five-year term in 2024. NSERC's annual budget was CA$ 1.3 billion for 2023-2024 and the number of employees (FTE) was 354.

Along with the Social Sciences and Humanities Research Council (SSHRC) and the Canadian Institutes for Health Research (CIHR), NSERC forms the major source of federal government funding to post-secondary research. They are collectively referred to as the "Tri-Council" or "Tri-Agency".

== History ==
NSERC came into existence on 1 May 1978 under the Natural Sciences and Engineering Research Council Act, which was passed in an omnibus manner by the government of Pierre Elliot Trudeau. University-based research had previously been supported through the National Research Council of Canada.

In 2022, NSERC released the Strategic Plan "NSERC 2030: Discover. Innovation. Inclusion." It emphasizes the following five pillars:

1. Support research excellence that strengthens Canada
2. Expand, diversify and nurture Canada's talent pool
3. Translate discovery into impact
4. Mobilize knowledge on a global scale
5. Empower our organization and our people

=== Presidents ===
- Gordon M. MacNabb (1978-1986)
- Arthur W. May (1986-1990)
- Peter Morand (1990-1995)
- Tom Brzustowski (1995-2005)
- Suzanne Fortier (2006-2013)
- B. Mario Pinto (2014-2018)
- Alejandro Adem (since 2019)

== Governance ==
It reports to Parliament through the Minister of Innovation, Science and Economic Development. It is governed by a Council composed of its president and up to 18 members appointed from the private and public sectors and an executive team of eight persons.

== Programs ==
NSERC funding opportunities are very diverse and include partnerships with other institutions. They are organized into three program streams: Discovery, Training and Partnership.

=== Discovery research programs ===
These grants support long-term, ongoing research programs for university faculty.

- Discovery Grants (DG): Provides operating funds to support ongoing, high-quality research programs. Supplements are also available for specific purposes.
- Northern Research Supplements (NRS): Provides additional funding to Discovery Grant recipients to cover the higher costs of research conducted in the Canadian North.
- Discovery Horizons (DH): A pilot program for interdisciplinary projects that transcend multiple disciplines to advance knowledge in the natural sciences and engineering.
- Research Tools and Instruments (RTI): Helps university researchers purchase or access specialized research equipment.

=== Training and awards programs ===
These grants provide funding to students and postdoctoral fellows at various career stages.

- Canada Research Training Awards Suite (CRTAS): This new suite, launched in 2025, harmonizes and replaces previous scholarships and fellowships. It includes:
  - Canada Graduate Research Scholarships (CGRS): Supports master's and doctoral students.
  - Canada Postdoctoral Research Awards (CPRA): Provides support to highly promising postdoctoral fellows.
  - Collaborative Research and Training Experience (CREATE) Program: Supports the development of innovative training programs that provide students with interdisciplinary and professional skills.
  - Undergraduate Student Research Awards (USRA): Encourages undergraduate students to undertake research during their studies.
- Chairs for Women in Science and Engineering
- Chairs for Inclusion in Science and Engineering

=== Research partnerships programs ===
These programs foster collaborations between university researchers and partner organizations.

- Alliance Grants:
  - Alliance Advantage: Supports projects with the highest potential for economic, social, and/or environmental benefits for Canada.
  - Alliance Society: Focuses on projects that address challenges at the intersection of natural sciences, engineering, and society.
  - Alliance International: Supports partnerships between Canadian and international academic researchers to establish and grow research collaborations of global importance with benefits to Canada.
- Idea to Innovation (I2I) Grants: Assists university and college researchers in developing promising technologies and commercializing their research.
- College and Community Innovation (CCI) Program: Supports collaborations between colleges, polytechnics, and their private- and public-sector partners to address local and regional innovation needs.

== Controversies ==
The Canadian Association of University Teachers accused NSERC in 2010 of an "ideology of increased selectivity" based on a decline in funding under the administration of Stephen Harper, Canadian Prime Minister from 2006-2015. The broader context was the alleged "muzzling" of scientists under the Harper administration, which culminated in the Death of Evidence rally on Parliament Hill in Ottawa in July 2012.

== See also ==
- Social Sciences and Humanities Research Council (SSHRC)
- Canadian Institutes for Health Research (CIHR)
- Canada Foundation for Innovation (CFI)
- Genome Canada
- National Science Foundation - US counterpart
- Engineering and Physical Sciences Research Council - UK counterpart
