= Butterfly count =

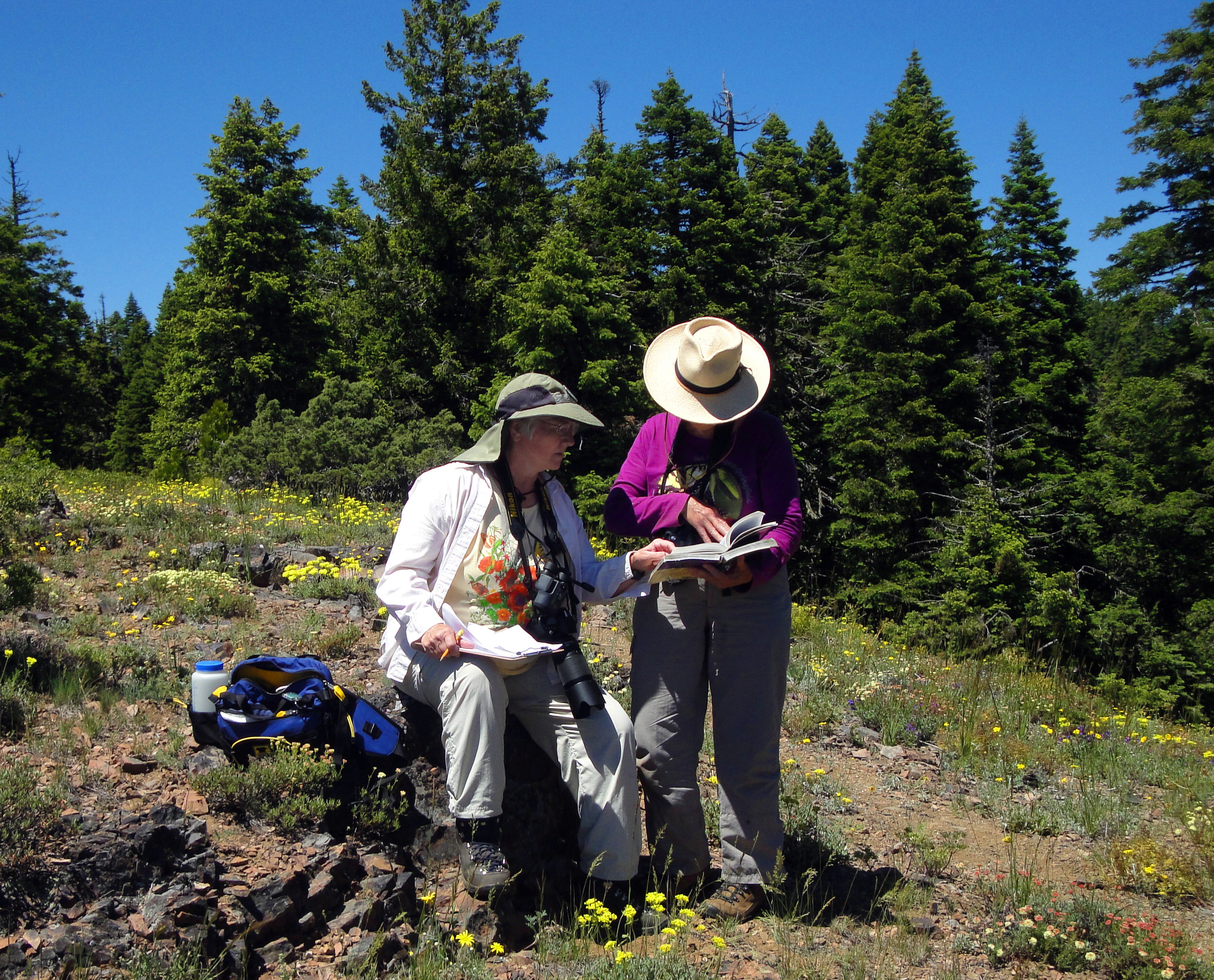
Participants bring field guides, nets, and cameras to a butterfly count in Oregon.

Butterfly counts are often carried out in North America and Europe to estimate the populations of butterflies in a specific geographical area.

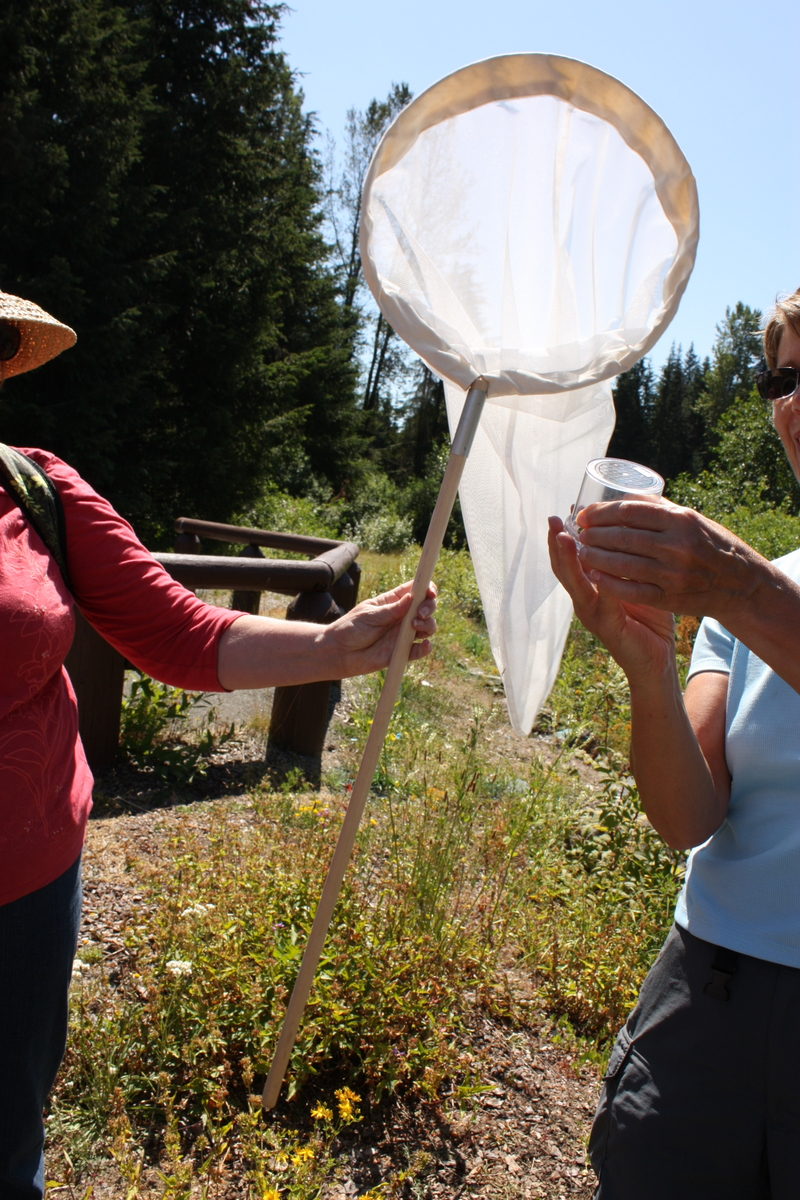
A mesh net for capture specimens

The counts are conducted by interested, mostly non-professional, residents of the area who maintain an interest in determining the numbers and species of butterflies in their locale. A butterfly count usually occurs at a specific time during the year and is sometimes coordinated to occur with other counts which may include a park, county, entire state or country. The results of the counts are usually shared with other interested parties including professional lepidopterists and researchers. The data gathered during a count can indicate population changes and health within a species.

== Sponsors ==
Professionals, universities, clubs, elementary and secondary schools, other educational providers, nature preserves, parks, and amateur organizations can organize a count. The participants often receive training to help them identify the butterfly species. The North American Butterfly Association organized over 400 counts in 2014.

== Types of butterfly counts ==
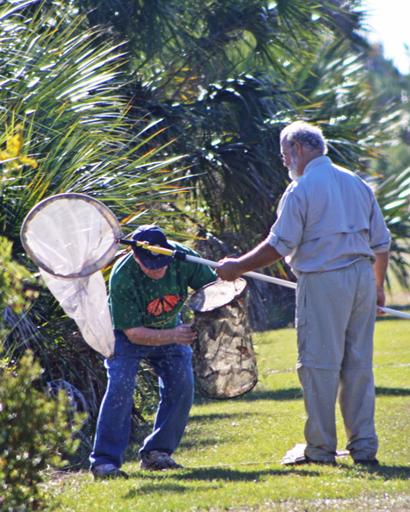
Capturing butterflies prior to tagging

There are several methods for counting butterflies currently in use, with the notable division being between restricted and open searches. Most counts are designed to count all butterflies observed in a locality. The purpose of a count is to estimate butterfly populations in a larger area from a smaller sample.

Counts may be targeted at single species and, in some cases, butterflies are observed and counted as they move from one area to another. A heavily researched example of butterfly migration is the annual migration of monarch butterflies in North America. Some programs will tag butterflies to trace their migration routes, but these are migratory programs and not butterfly counts. Butterfly counts are sometimes done where there is a concentration (a roost) of a species of butterflies in an area. One example of this is the winter count of western monarch butterflies as they roost together at sites in California, northern Mexico and Arizona.

=== Restricted searches: transects ===
Frequently referred to as "Pollard Transects" or "Pollard Walks" in North America, a transect is a protocol designed to standardize the recording of butterfly observations, the initial format was outlined by Ernie Pollard in 1977. The transect protocol involves one observer walking a fixed path at a constant pace, multiple times in a season. Butterflies are counted when they are seen within a prescribed distance from the path, often 2.5 meters on either side of the path, and only when the butterflies are seen in front of, or above, the observer (i.e., no backtracking). A second person may work with the observer to identify and/or photograph insects spotted by the observer. Transects should not change from year to year and ideally should sample a variety of habitats.

Examples of long-running restricted searches are Art Shapiro's Butterfly Project in the US (started in 1972), and the UK Butterfly Monitoring Scheme (started in 1976).

=== Open searches ===
Open searches, also sometimes referred to as "checklist searches", are intended to focus on the presence and abundance of butterflies in a given area. They can be single events such as the North American Butterfly Association's July 1 and July 4 counts in Canada and the U.S. respectively, or they can be regular or ad hoc counts conducted by individuals or groups. The lack of formal structure makes them suitable for many citizen science programs.

In terms of the relative outcomes or the efficacy of open vs. restricted searches, studies have shown that open searches are more likely to find a greater number of species in a given area. Royer, et al. note that one reason for this is that during an open search, the "observer is free to search out places where butterflies typically would breed or congregate" rather than follow the fixed path of a transect.

=== Opportunistic sightings ===
Opportunistic or incidental sightings are butterfly sightings that are not part of a formal count. Observers may note signal butterflies or multiple species. An example of an opportunistic sighting is observing a butterfly in a garden and reporting it.

=== Atlas projects ===
Described as a "special type of open search", atlas projects are generally targeted at a specific geographical area such as a province or state. The goal is to assess the presence or absence of species, usually over a multi-year period. Each atlas program will design its own data requirements but as they are measuring abundance and presence, they tend to accept data from transects, counts, and opportunistic sightings to build a database. The longest-running atlas program in North America is the Ontario Butterfly Atlas Online, which is supported by the Toronto Entomologists' Association and began collecting data in 1969.

=== Bait stations ===
Transects and open searches are not as comprehensive in tropical locations due to issues such as the density of flora and the height of the forest canopy. A counting system using bait stations with fermenting fruit has been used to assess specific populations.

== Quantifying observations ==
Participants are encouraged to employ a number of techniques to quantify large aggregations by making estimates of butterflies:

- concentrated along linear features
- concentrated in an area of uniform habitat
- concentrated on certain plants
- butterflies in flight

The number of butterflies can be estimated by the area size they inhabit, for example, in the overwintering population present in Mexico the population expressed in hectares. Butterflies can be counted in their egg, larvae and instar number.

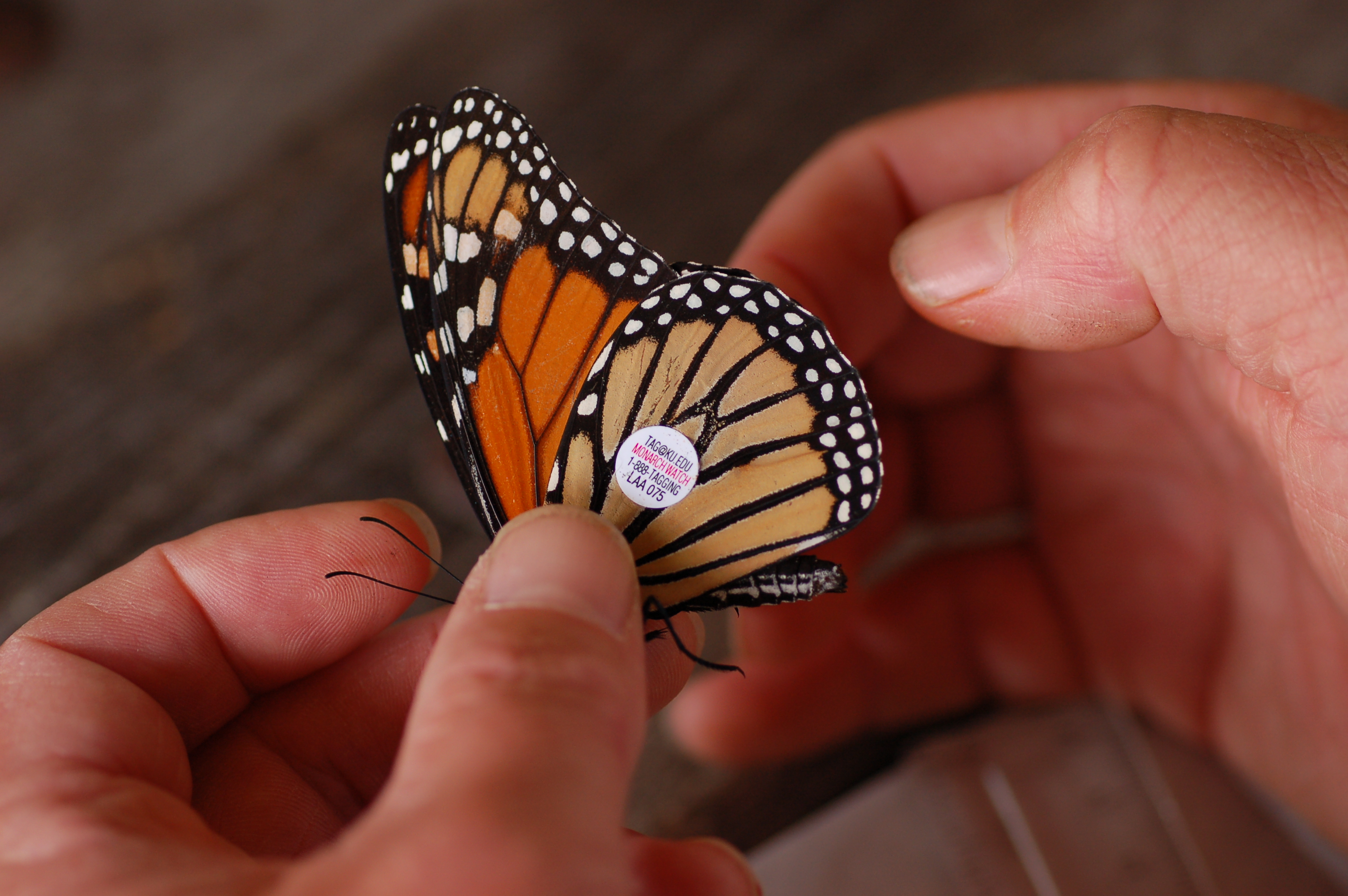
Tagged butterfly

Butterflies are sometimes captured, tagged, and recovered. The number of tags recovered in a specific area is used to determine population size and direction of flight.

== See also ==
- Butterfly Conservation
- North American Butterfly Association
- Lepidoptera migration
- List of butterflies of Great Britain
- Monarch Butterfly Biosphere Reserve
- Animal Migration
- eButterfly
- Monarch butterfly migration
