= List of women in mathematics =

This is a list of women who have made noteworthy contributions to or achievements in mathematics. These include mathematical research, mathematics education, the history and philosophy of mathematics, public outreach, and mathematics contests.

== A ==
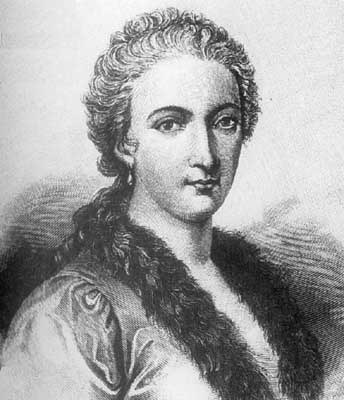
Maria Gaetana Agnesi wrote one of the first calculus textbooks in 1748. She was offered a professorship by the Bologna Academy of Sciences, making her the first female mathematics professor since antiquity, but it is unknown whether she accepted.

- Karen Aardal (born 1961), Norwegian and Dutch applied mathematician, theoretical computer scientist, and operations researcher
- Hanan Mohamed Abdelrahman, Egyptian and Norwegian mathematics educator
- Izabela Abramowicz (1889–1973), Polish mathematician and mathematics educator
- Louise Doris Adams (1889–1965), British mathematics reformer, president of the Mathematical Association
- Rachel Blodgett Adams (1894–1982), American mathematician, one of the earliest mathematics doctorates from Radcliffe College
- Tatyana Afanasyeva (1876–1964), Russian-Dutch researcher in statistical mechanics, randomness, and geometry education
- Amandine Aftalion (born 1973), French applied mathematician, studies superfluids and the mathematics of footracing
- Maria Gaetana Agnesi (1718–1799), Italian mathematician and philosopher, possibly the first female mathematics professor
- Ilka Agricola (born 1973), German expert on differential geometry and its applications in mathematical physics
- Nkechi Agwu (born 1962), African American ethnomathematician
- Dorit Aharonov (born 1970), Israeli specialist in quantum computing
- Beatrice Aitchison (1908–1997), American topologist who became a transportation economist in the US civil service
- Noreen Sher Akbar, Pakistani fluid dynamicist
- Evelyn Niemann Akeley (1907–1998), American mathematician and cryptanalyst
- Shabnam Akhtari, Iranian number theorist
- Jacqueline Akinpelu (born 1953), American applied mathematician and operations researcher
- Asuman Aksoy, Turkish-American functional analyst
- Meike Akveld, Swiss knot theorist and mathematics educator
- Fatiha Alabau (born 1961), French expert in control of partial differential equations, president of French applied mathematics society
- Mara Alagic, Serbian mathematics educator, editor-in-chief of Journal of Mathematics and the Arts
- Ofelia Teresa Alas (born 1943), second woman to receive mathematics Ph.D. in Brazil from a Brazilian institution
- Lara Alcock, British mathematics educator and author
- Helen Popova Alderson (1924–1972), Russian and British mathematician and translator, wrote on quasigroups and reciprocity laws
- Grace Alele-Williams (1932–2022), first woman to lead a Nigerian university
- Aldona Aleškevičienė-Statulevičienė (1936–2017), Lithuanian probability theorist
- Stephanie B. Alexander, American differential geometer
- Florence Eliza Allen (1876–1960), second female and fourth overall mathematics PhD from the University of Wisconsin
- Linda J. S. Allen, American mathematician and mathematical biologist
- Elizabeth S. Allman (born 1965), American mathematical biologist
- Ann S. Almgren, American applied mathematician who works on computational simulations of supernovae and white dwarfs
- Melania Alvarez, Mexican-Canadian mathematics educator, organizer of summer mathematics camps for indigenous students
- Yvette Amice (1936–1993), French expert on p-adic analysis who became president of the French mathematical society
- Divsha Amirà (1899–1966), Israeli geometer and mathematics educator
- T. A. Sarasvati Amma (1918–2000), Historian of ancient Indian mathematics
- Astrid an Huef, New Zealand expert on functional analysis, president of New Zealand Mathematical Society
- Nalini Anantharaman (born 1976), French mathematical physicist, winner of the Henri Poincaré Prize
- Beverly Anderson (born 1943), American mathematician, director of minority programs for Mathematical Sciences Education Board
- Kirsti Andersen (born 1941), Danish historian of mathematics
- Cabiria Andreian Cazacu (1928–2018), Romanian complex analyst
- Hajnal Andréka (born 1947), Hungarian researcher in algebraic logic
- Annie Dale Biddle Andrews (1885–1940), algebraic geometer, first female PhD from the University of California, Berkeley
- Grace Andrews (mathematician) (1869–1951), one of only two women listed in the first edition of American Men of Science
- Lidia Angeleri Hügel (born 1960), Italian expert on tilting theory and silting theory
- Guacolda Antoine Lazzerini (1908–2015), Chilean mathematician and mathematics educator
- Kathleen Antonelli (1921–2006), Irish-American programmer of ENIAC, the first general-purpose electronic digital computer
- Paola Antonietti (born 1980), Italian numerical analyst, applies domain decomposition methods to geophysical simulation
- Noriko H. Arai (born 1962), Japanese mathematical logician and artificial intelligence researcher
- Crista Arangala, American numerical analyst, textbook author, and international educator
- Carolina Araujo, Brazilian algebraic geometer
- Gabriela Araujo-Pardo, Mexican graph theorist, president of Mexican Mathematical Society
- Maria Angela Ardinghelli (1730–1825), Italian translator of Stephen Hales, mathematician, physicist and noble
- Esther Arkin, Israeli-American researcher in operations research and computational geometry
- Sandra Arlinghaus, founder of the Institute of Mathematical Geography
- Beulah Armstrong (1895–1965), American mathematician, University of Illinois
- Marie-Claude Arnaud, French expert in dynamical systems
- Mary Nicholas Arnoldy (1893–1985), American nun and mathematician
- Fuensanta Aroca, Spanish-Mexican tropical geometer
- Elayne Arrington, American aerospace engineer, expert on Soviet aircraft
- Sharon Arroyo, American operations researcher in aircraft manufacture
- Michèle Artigue (born 1946), French expert in mathematics education
- Natascha Artin Brunswick (1909–2003), German-American mathematician, photographer, and journal editor
- Shiri Artstein (born 1978), Israeli mathematician specializing in convex geometry and asymptotic geometric analysis
- Marcia Ascher (1935–2013), American ethnomathematician
- Winifred Asprey (1917–2007), helped establish the first computer science lab at Vassar
- Hilda Assiyatun, Indonesian graph theorist, president of Indonesian Combinatorial Society
- Susan Assmann (1956–2020), American discrete mathematician and biostatistician
- Michèle Audin (born 1954), French researcher in symplectic geometry
- Bonnie Averbach (1933–2019), American mathematics and actuarial educator and author
- Tamara Awerbuch-Friedlander (died 2021), American biomathematician and public health scientist
- Christine Ayoub (1922–2024), Canadian-American algebraist
- Hertha Ayrton (1854–1923), English engineer, mathematician, physicist, and inventor, winner of the Hughes Medal

== B ==
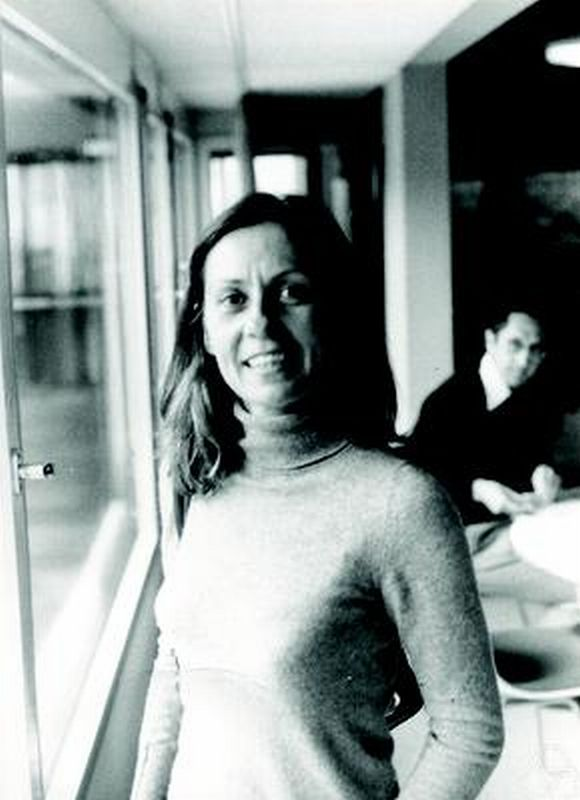
Alexandra Bellow (1935–2025) contributed to ergodic theory, probability and analysis.

- Ellen Baake (born 1961), German mathematical biologist
- Wealthy Babcock (1895–1990), American mathematician, namesake of Kansas University mathematics library
- Christine Bachoc (born 1964), French expert on coding theory and kissing numbers
- Clara Latimer Bacon (1866–1948), first woman to earn a Ph.D. in mathematics from Johns Hopkins University
- Jenny Baglivo (born 1948), American mathematician, statistician, and book author
- Hajer Bahouri (born 1958), Franco-Tunisian mathematician interested in partial differential equations
- Ann E. Bailie (born 1935), American mathematician and space scientist, discovered that the earth is pear-shaped
- Frances Ellen Baker (1902–1995), American mathematician and number theorist
- Kitty Baker (1912–2014), American mathematics educator, artist and weaver, and author
- Rose Baker, British physicist, mathematician, and statistician
- Ruth Baker, British mathematical biologist interested in pattern formation and morphogenesis
- Rena Bakhshi (born 1981), Dutch complex network theorist
- Viviane Baladi (born 1963), Swiss-French expert on dynamical systems
- Jennifer Balakrishnan, American number theorist who solved the "cursed curve"
- Deborah Loewenberg Ball, American mathematics education researcher
- Cristina Ballantine, Romanian-born American algebraic combinatorist and number theorist
- Catherine Bandle (born 1943), Swiss expert on differential equations and isoperimetric inequalities
- Selenne Bañuelos (born 1985), Mexican-American mathematician and mathematical biologist
- Hélène Barcelo (born 1954), mathematician from Québec, former editor-in-chief of Journal of Combinatorial Theory, Series A
- Grace Marie Bareis (1875–1962), American group theorist, first mathematics Ph.D. at Ohio State, and founding member of the MAA
- Nina Bari (1901–1961), Soviet mathematician known for her work on trigonometric series
- Ruth Aaronson Bari (1917–2005), American mathematician known for her work in graph theory and homomorphisms
- Mildred Barnard (1908–2000), Australian biometrician, mathematician and statistician
- Janet Barnett, American mathematician known for integrating the history of mathematics into her teaching
- Ida Barney (1886–1982), American mathematics professor and astronomer
- Charlotte Barnum (1860–1934), mathematician and social activist, first female mathematics PhD from Yale
- Margaret Baron (1915–1996), British mathematics educator and historian of mathematics
- Lida Barrett (1927–2021), second female president of the MAA
- Katrina Barron (born 1965), American expert on vertex operator algebra
- June Barrow-Green (born 1953), British historian of mathematics
- Jean Bartik (1924–2011), one of the original programmers for the ENIAC computer
- Martha Helen Barton (1891–1971), American mathematician and professor
- Estelle Basor (born 1947), American mathematician interested in operator theory and the theory of random matrices
- Marjorie Batchelor, American mathematician known for Batchelor's theorem on supermanifolds
- Grace Bates (1914–1996), one of few women in the United States to be granted a PhD in mathematics in the 1940s
- Lynn Batten (born 1948), Canadian immigrant to Australia, researcher in finite geometries and cryptography
- Helga Baum (born 1954), German differential geometer
- Patricia E. Bauman, studies the mathematics of liquid crystals and superconductors
- Karin Baur, Swiss combinatorial representation theorist
- Agnes Sime Baxter (1870–1917), second Canadian and fourth North American woman to earn a mathematics PhD
- Margaret Bayer, American mathematician working in polyhedral combinatorics
- Pilar Bayer (born 1946), Spanish number theorist
- Eva Bayer-Fluckiger (born 1951), Hungarian-Swiss mathematician, proved Serre's conjecture on Galois cohomology of classical groups
- Jillian Beardwood (1934–2019), British mathematician, contributed to the traveling salesperson problem
- Karine Beauchard (born 1978), French control theorist
- Agnès Beaudry, Canadian-American stable homotopy theorist
- Miriam Becker (1909–2000), American mathematician whose career became a test case for unionization and academic tenure
- Astrid Beckmann (born 1957), German mathematician, mathematics educator, physicist, and academic administrator
- May Beenken (1901–1988), American mathematician
- Janet Beery, American mathematician and historian of mathematics
- Mary Beisiegel, American mathematics educator
- Marion Beiter (1907–1982), American mathematician, expert on cyclotomic polynomials
- sarah-marie belcastro, American algebraic geometer, editor of books on mathematics and fiber arts
- Hélène Bellosta (1946–2011), French historian of mathematics in medieval Islam
- Alexandra Bellow (1935–2025), Romanian researcher in ergodic theory, probability and analysis
- Margherita Piazzola Beloch (1879–1976), Italian researcher in algebraic geometry, algebraic topology and photogrammetry
- Amel Ben Abda, Tunisian applied mathematician
- Carolina Benedetti, Colombian combinatorist, co-executive director of Mathematical Circles Colombia
- Suzan Rose Benedict (1873–1942), first woman to earn a PhD from the University of Michigan
- Georgia Benkart (1947–2022), American mathematician, expert on Lie algebras
- Alona Ben-Tal, Israeli and New Zealand applied mathematician, models human and bird breathing
- Deborah J. Bennett (born 1950), American mathematics educator and popular mathematics book author
- Sylvie Benzoni (born 1967), French expert in fluid dynamics and partial differential equations, director of the Institut Henri Poincaré
- Bonnie Berger, American mathematician and computer scientist, researcher in computational molecular biology
- Marsha Berger (born 1953), American researcher in numerical analysis, computational fluid dynamics, and parallel computing
- Tanja Bergkvist (born 1974), Swedish mathematician and anti-feminist activist
- Julie Bergner, American expert on algebraic topology, homotopy theory, and higher category theory
- Christine Berkesch, American algebraic geometer
- Nicole Berline (born 1944), French researcher on index theory of elliptic differential operators
- Natalia Berloff, professor of applied mathematics at the University of Cambridge
- Leah Berman (born 1976), American discrete geometer
- Christine Bernardi (1955–2018), French expert on numerical analysis of partial differential equations
- Dorothy Lewis Bernstein (1914–1988), applied mathematician, first female president of the MAA
- Inga Berre (born 1978), Norwegian applied mathematician, models porous media and geothermal systems
- Valérie Berthé (born 1968), French researcher in symbolic dynamics, combinatorics on words, and discrete geometry
- Andrea Bertozzi (born 1965), American researcher in partial differential equations, studies mathematics of urban crime
- Nadine Bezuk, American mathematics educator, president and executive director of Association of Mathematics Teacher Educators
- Vasanti N. Bhat-Nayak (1938–2009), professor of combinatorics and head of mathematics at the University of Mumbai
- Ushadevi Bhosle (born 1949), Indian expert on vector bundles
- Francesca Biagini (born 1973), Italian-German probability theorist and financial mathematician
- Ginestra Bianconi, Italian network scientist
- Lydia Bieri (born 1972), Swiss-American expert on general relativity, gravity waves, and the history of cosmology
- Anna Maria Bigatti, Italian algebraist, developer of CoCoA
- Hester Bijl, Dutch professor of numerical mathematics and academic administrator
- Miggy Biller, British mathematician and mathematics educator
- Sara Billey (born 1968), American algebraic combinatorialist
- Katalin Bimbó (born 1963), Canadian mathematical logician and proof theorist
- Christina Birkenhake (born 1961), German algebraic geometer
- Joan Birman (born 1927), American braid and knot theorist
- Laure Blanc-Féraud (born 1963), French applied mathematician and image processing researcher
- Gertrude Blanch (1897–1996), American numerical analyst
- Roswitha Blind, German convex geometer and politician
- Karen M. Bliss, American applied mathematician specializing in biomedical applications and materials science
- Lenore Blum (born 1942), distinguished professor of computer science at Carnegie Mellon University
- Jo Boaler (born 1964), British-American promoter of mathematics education reform and equitable mathematics classrooms
- Mary L. Boas (1917–2010), author of Mathematical Methods in the Physical Sciences
- Christine Böckmann (born 1955), German numerical analyst, expert in atmospheric lidar
- Graciela Boente, Argentine mathematical statistician known for her research in robust statistics
- Sabine Bögli, Swiss mathematical analyst
- Neda Bokan (born 1947), Serbian differential geometer
- Vrushali Bokil, Indian-American applied mathematician
- Natashia Boland (born 1967), Australian mathematician and operations researcher
- Sylvie Boldo, French expert in formal verification of numerical computation
- Aline Bonami, French mathematical analyst, president of the Société mathématique de France
- Petra Bonfert-Taylor, German-American complex analyst and engineering educator
- Virginie Bonnaillie-Noël (born 1976), French numerical analyst
- Alicia Boole Stott (1860–1940), Irish-English four-dimensional geometer
- Mary Everest Boole (1832–1916), self-taught author of didactic works on mathematics
- Kathleen Booth (1922–2022), British mathematician and pioneer of assembly language computer programming
- Liliana Borcea, Romanian-American applied mathematician, expert on wave propagation
- Valentina Borok (1931–2004), Soviet Ukrainian mathematician who studied partial differential equations
- Celia Grillo Borromeo (1684–1777), Genovese mathematician and scientist, discovered Clélie curve
- Liouba Bortniker (1860 – after 1903), Russian-French mathematician, first woman agrégée in mathematics, first winner of Peccot prize
- Fernanda Botelho (born 1957), Portuguese-American functional analyst
- Julia Böttcher, German graph theorist
- Mary Michel Boulus (1926–2012), American Catholic nun, mathematics teacher, and college president
- Ludmila Bourchtein, Soviet and Brazilian mathematical analyst and textbook author
- Anne Bourlioux, Canadian expert in turbulent combustion and world record holder in indoor rowing
- Élisabeth Bouscaren (born 1956), French mathematician who studies the connections between algebraic geometry and model theory
- Mireille Bousquet-Mélou (born 1967), French combinatorialist
- Anne Boutet de Monvel (born 1948), French applied mathematician and mathematical physicist
- Debra Boutin (1957–2025), American mathematician, expert on the symmetries of graphs
- Sylvia Bozeman (born 1947), African-American mathematician and academic administrator
- Lis Brack-Bernsen (born 1946), Danish and Swiss mathematician, historian of science, and historian of mathematics
- Mary Bradburn (1923–2000), British mathematics educator, president of the Mathematical Association
- Elizabeth Bradley (born 1961), American expert in nonlinear dynamical systems, competed in 1988 Olympics
- Lillian K. Bradley (1921–1995), first African-American woman to earn a doctorate in any subject at the University of Texas
- Dorothy Brady (1903–1977), American mathematician and economist
- Priscilla Braislin (1838–1888), first professor of mathematics at Vassar College
- Leila Bram (1927–1979), head of mathematics for Office of Naval Research
- Leticia Brambila Paz (born 1953), Mexican algebraic geometer
- Bodil Branner (born 1943), founder of European Women in Mathematics, chair of the Danish Mathematical Society
- Hel Braun (1914–1986), German number theorist
- Elena Braverman, Russian, Israeli, and Canadian researcher in delay differential equations and difference equations
- Loretta Braxton (1934–2019), American mathematician
- Marilyn Breen (born 1944), American geometer
- Tara E. Brendle, American low-dimensional topologist and combinatorial group theorist
- Susanne Brenner, expert in the numerical solution of differential equations
- Sonja Brentjes (born 1951), German historian of Islamic mathematics and cartography
- Diane Briars (born 1951), American mathematics educator, advocate for education reform, president of National Council of Teachers of Mathematics
- Kathrin Bringmann (born 1977), German number theorist, expert on mock theta functions, winner of SASTRA Ramanujan Prize
- Ruth Britto, American mathematical physicist
- Jill Britton (1944–2016), Canadian mathematics educator, author of educational books on mathematics
- Bárbara M. Brizuela, American researcher on mathematics education in early childhood and elementary school
- Anne Broadbent, Canadian researcher on quantum computing, quantum cryptography, and quantum information
- Tamara Broderick, American mathematician and computer scientist who works in machine learning and Bayesian inference
- Lia Bronsard (born 1963), Canadian expert on interface dynamics, president of Canadian Mathematical Society
- Margaret Brown, British mathematics educator
- Susan Brown (1937–2017), English fluid mechanics researcher, possibly second female mathematics professor in UK
- Marjorie Lee Browne (1914–1979), one of the first African-American women to receive a doctorate in mathematics
- Laurence Broze (born 1960), Belgian applied mathematician, statistician, and economist, president of l'association femmes et mathématiques
- Karen Brucks (1957–2017), American mathematician, expert on one-dimensional dynamical systems
- Maria Bruna (born 1984), Spanish applied mathematician known for stochastic modelling of multiscale phenomena
- Sophie Bryant (1850–1922), Anglo-Irish mathematician, educator, feminist and activist
- Ranee Brylinski (born 1957), American mathematician known for her research in representation theory and quantum logic gates
- Evelyn Buckwar, German-Austrian expert on stochastic differential equations
- Alina Bucur, American analytic number theorist and arithmetic statistician
- Lilya Budaghyan, Armenian-Norwegian cryptographer
- Annalisa Buffa (born 1973), Italian specialist in numerical analysis for partial differential equations
- Marta Bunge (1938–2022), Argentine-Canadian category theorist
- Angelika Bunse-Gerstner (born 1951), German expert on numerical linear algebra
- Regina S. Burachik, Argentine-Australian researcher in convex analysis, functional analysis and non-smooth analysis
- Almut Burchard, German-Canadian functional analyst, probability theorist, and communication network analyst
- Marilyn Burns (born 1941), American mathematics educator and author of children's books on mathematics
- Ellen Burrell (1850–1938), American mathematician
- Gail F. Burrill, American mathematics educator, president of National Council of Teachers of Mathematics
- Leone Burton (1936–2007), British researcher in ethnomathematics, founded book series on women in mathematics
- Edith Bush (1882–1977), American mathematician, first female engineering professor at Tufts University
- Ida Busbridge (1908–1988), studied integral equations and radiative transfer, first female mathematics fellow at Oxford
- Marjorie V. Butcher (1925–2016), American actuarial mathematician, first woman mathematics instructor at Michigan, first woman professor at Trinity College Connecticut
- Lynne Butler (born 1955), American combinatorialist and mathematical statistician
- Margaret K. Butler (1924–2013), computer programmer, director of the National Energy Software Center at Argonne
- Helen Byrne, British applied mathematician and mathematical biologist

== C ==
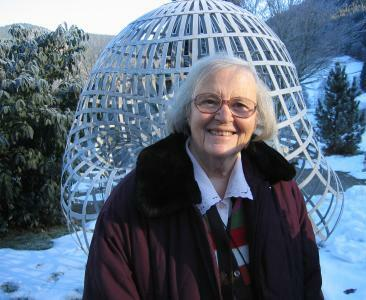
Yvonne Choquet-Bruhat was a leading authority on general relativity and is known for existence results in a variety of physical theories. In 1984 she made an influential study of supergravity.

- María Emilia Caballero, Mexican probability theorist
- Angelina Cabras (1898–1993), Italian mathematician, physicist, and theoretical mechanics professor
- Hannah Cairo, American harmonic analyst
- Fioralba Cakoni, Albanian expert on inverse scattering theory
- Maria-Carme Calderer, Spanish-American researcher in applied mathematics
- Nora Calderwood (1896–1985), Scottish mathematician, namesake of Birmingham University's Calderwood Prize
- Helen Calkins (1893–1970), American mathematician and professor
- Daniela Calvetti, Italian-American mathematician whose work connects Bayesian statistics with numerical analysis
- Erika Tatiana Camacho (born 1974), Mexican-American mathematical biologist
- Lucy Campbell, geophysical fluid dynamics researcher from Barbados, Jamaica, Ghana, and Canada
- Sue Ann Campbell, Canadian applied mathematician and computational neuroscientist, president of Canadian Applied and Industrial Mathematical Society
- Jessie Forbes Cameron (1883–1968), British mathematician, first woman to complete her PhD in mathematics at the University of Marburg
- Naiomi Cameron, American combinatorist, vice president of National Association of Mathematicians
- Patricia Campbell, American mathematics educator
- María Antònia Canals (1930–2022), Spanish mathematics educator and recreational mathematician
- Sunčica Čanić, Croatian-American expert in modeling the cardiovascular system and devices for treating it
- Ana Cannas da Silva (born 1968), Portuguese mathematician specializing in symplectic geometry and geometric topology
- Barbara Canright (1920–1997), American human computer at the Jet Propulsion Laboratory
- Yaiza Canzani, Spanish and Uruguayan mathematical analysis, known for work in spectral geometry and microlocal analysis
- Mireille Capitaine, French researcher on random matrices and free probability theory
- Lucia Caporaso, Italian algebraic geometer
- Marian Palmer Capps (1901–2001), American mathematician and leader of prominent African-American women's societies
- Ana Caraiani, Romanian-American IMO medalist, Putnam fellow, expert in algebraic number theory and the Langlands program
- Olivia Caramello (born 1984), Italian topos theorist
- Alessandra Carbone, Italian mathematician and computer scientist, studies protein interactions in muscular dystrophy
- Marilyn Carlson, American mathematics education scholar focusing on the teaching of precalculus
- Sally Elizabeth Carlson (1896–2000), first woman to obtain a doctorate in mathematics at the University of Minnesota
- Debra Carney, American mathematics educator
- Ana Carpio, Spanish applied mathematician
- María J. Carro (born 1961), Spanish mathematical analyst
- Anna Cartan (1878–1923), French mathematician, teacher and textbook author, student of Marie Curie
- Coralia Cartis, Romanian expert on compressed sensing, numerical analysis, and regularization methods in optimization
- Mary Cartwright (1900–1998), British mathematician, one of the first to analyze a dynamical system with chaos
- María Andrea Casamayor (1700–1780), only 18th-century Spanish scientist whose work is still extant
- Bettye Anne Case, American mathematician and historian of mathematics
- Emma Castelnuovo (1913–2014), Italian mathematics educator and textbook author
- Eleonora Catsigeras (born 1956), Uruguayan mathematician, applies dynamical systems in neuroscience
- Catherine Cavagnaro (born 1965), American low-dimensional topologist and aerobatic aviator
- Beatrice Mabel Cave-Browne-Cave (1874–1947), English pioneer in the mathematics of aeronautics
- Frances Cave-Browne-Cave (1876–1965), English mathematician and computer scientist, taught at Girton College, Cambridge
- Anny Cazenave (born 1944), French space geodesist, pioneer in satellite altimetry
- Zoia Ceaușescu (1949–2006), Romanian functional analyst, daughter of Communist leader
- Elena Celledoni (born 1967), Italian-Norwegian expert on numerical analysis, Lie groups, and structure-preserving algorithms
- Isabelle Chalendar, French functional analyst
- Vivien Challis, Australian Applied mathematician, expert in topology optimization
- Sue Chandler, author of English secondary-school mathematics textbooks
- Melody Chan, American expert in combinatorial commutative algebra, graph theory, and tropical geometry
- Sun-Yung Alice Chang (born 1948), Chinese-American mathematical analyst, member of National Academy of Sciences
- Josephine Chanler (1906–1992), American mathematician
- Mei-Chu Chang, Taiwanese-American expert in algebraic geometry and combinatorial number theory
- Vyjayanthi Chari (born 1958), Indian-American expert in quantum algebra
- Ruth Charney (born 1950), American expert on geometric group theory and Artin groups, president of the Association for Women in Mathematics (AWM)
- Marie Charpentier (1903–1994), first woman to earn a doctorate in pure mathematics in France and second to obtain a faculty position there
- Émilie du Châtelet (1706–1749), French translator and commentator of Isaac Newton's Principia Mathematica
- Françoise Chatelin (1941–2020), French applied mathematician and numerical analyst
- Indira Chatterji (born 1973), Swiss-Indian low-dimensional geometer
- Zoé Chatzidakis, French researcher in model theory and differential algebra
- Laura Chaubard, French mathematician, Director General of the École Polytechnique
- Madeleine Chaumont (1896–1973), French mathematician, one of first women at École normale supérieure
- Jennifer Tour Chayes (born 1956), expert on phase transitions in networks, founder of the theory group at Microsoft Research
- Karine Chemla (born 1958), French historian of Chinese mathematics
- Jacqueline Chen, American applied mathematician and mechanical engineer, applies massively parallel computing to simulate combustion
- Jing (Maggie) Chen, Chinese-British financial mathematician, expert on Hawkes processes
- Xiaojun Chen, Chinese applied mathematician, expert on nonconvex optimization
- Margaret Cheney (born 1955), American expert on inverse problems
- Eugenia Cheng, English category theorist and pianist, uses analogies with food and baking to teach mathematics to non-mathematicians
- Leslie Cheng, American harmonic analyst
- Maggie Cheng, Chinese-American applied mathematician, computer scientist, and network scientist
- Miranda Cheng (born 1979), Taiwanese-Dutch mathematician and theoretical physicist, formulated umbral moonshine
- Yingda Cheng (born 1983), Chinese-American applied mathematician, expert in Galerkin methods
- Alina Chertock, mathematician specializing in the numerical solution of partial differential equations modeling flow and chemotaxis
- Amanda Chetwynd, British combinatorist and spatial statistician
- Elaine Chew, Singaporean-American expert in the mathematics and visualization of concepts in music theory
- Tanya Christiansen, American expert on scattering theory and partial differential equations
- Graciela Chichilnisky (born 1944), Argentine-American mathematical economist and authority on climate change
- Lauren M. Childs, American mathematician, expert on modeling disease spread
- Phyllis Chinn (born 1941), American graph theorist and historian of mathematics
- Grace Chisholm Young (1868–1944), English mathematician, first woman to receive a German doctorate
- Sonya Christian, Indian mathematician and American community college administrator
- YoungJu Choie (born 1959), Korean number theorist
- Yvonne Choquet-Bruhat (1923–2025), French mathematician and physicist, first woman elected to the French Academy
- Maria Chudnovsky (born 1977), Israeli-American graph theorist, MacArthur Fellow
- Fan Chung (born 1949), Taiwanese-American researcher in random graphs
- Julia Chuzhoy, Israeli expert in approximation algorithms and graph minor theory
- Monique Chyba, applied control theory to autonomous underwater vehicles
- Agata Ciabattoni, Italian non-classical mathematical logician
- Maria Cibrario (1905–1992), Italian specialist in partial differential equations
- Marta Civil, American mathematics educator
- Mónica Clapp, Mexican researcher in nonlinear partial differential equations and algebraic topology
- Cathy Ann Clark, American applied mathematician known for computational modeling of undersea acoustics
- Lisa Orloff Clark, professor of mathematics at Victoria University of Wellington in New Zealand
- Joan Clarke (1917–1996), English code-breaker at Bletchley Park, numismatist
- Jeanne N. Clelland (born 1970), American expert on differential geometry and its applications to differential equations
- Mary Clem (1905–1979), American mathematician and human computer, invented zero check error detection
- Harriet Redfield Cobb (1866–1958), American mathematician
- Anne Cobbe (1920–1971), British algebraist
- Sally Cockburn (born 1960), Canadian-American mathematician
- Jane Purcell Coffee (1944–2023), one of the first women to earn a mathematics PhD at U. Penn.; founded a teaching academy
- Judita Cofman (1936–2001), Yugoslav-German finite geometer and mathematics educator, first mathematics doctorate from Novi Sad
- Doris Cohen, American mathematician, first female author in the National Advisory Committee for Aeronautics
- Elaine Cohen, American pioneer in the use of splines for geometric modeling
- Marion Cohen (born 1943), American poet and mathematician, teaches the relationship between art and mathematics
- Miriam Cohen (born 1941), Israeli researcher in Hopf algebras, quantum groups and non-commutative rings
- Amy Cohen-Corwin, American expert in the Korteweg–de Vries equation and cubic Schrödinger equation
- Alina Carmen Cojocaru, Romanian number theorist
- Margaret Buchanan Cole, American mathematician at West Virginia University
- Nancy Cole (1902–1991), American mathematician, made pioneering contributions to Morse theory
- Caroline Colijn, Canadian mathematical epidemiologist
- Susan Jane Colley (born 1959), first female editor-in-chief of the American Mathematical Monthly
- Agnes Bell Collier (1860–1930), British mathematician
- Karen L. Collins, American graph theorist and combinatorist
- Sandra Collins (born 1970), Irish fluid dynamicist and librarian
- Coralie Colmez, French writer on legal mathematics
- Maria Colombo (born 1989), Italian mathematical analyst
- Caterina Consani (born 1963), Italian mathematician specializing in arithmetic geometry
- Keisha Cook, American mathematical biologist
- Pamela Cook, American expert in fluid dynamics, president of SIAM
- Frances Cope (1902–1983), American researcher on differential equations, namesake of the Thorndike nomogram
- Lennie Copeland (1881–1951), American mathematician and professor at Wellesley College
- Minerva Cordero, Puerto Rican expert on finite geometry
- Lesley Cormack (born 1957), Canadian historian of mathematics and historian of geography
- Leticia Corral (born 1959), Mexican mathematician, astrophysicist and materials scientist
- Sylvie Corteel, French combinatorialist, former editor-in-chief of Journal of Combinatorial Theory, Series A
- Véronique Cortier, French mathematician and computer scientist, uses mathematical logic to verify cryptographic protocols
- Carla Cotwright-Williams (born 1973), African-American data scientist for the US government
- Pamela G. Coxson, American applied mathematician specializing in disease modeling
- Collette Coullard, American matroid theorist and operations researcher
- Judith Covington, American mathematics educator
- Lenore Cowen, American discrete mathematician, computer scientist, and computational biologist
- Elizabeth Buchanan Cowley (1874–1945), American mathematician, advocated high school teaching of solid geometry
- Annalisa Crannell, American expert on water waves and geometric perspective
- Alissa Crans, American mathematician specializing in higher-dimensional algebra
- Mary Croarken, British historian of mathematics and of computing
- Marie Crous, 17th-century mathematician who introduced the decimal system to France
- Ana Bela Cruzeiro (born 1957), Portuguese and Swiss stochastic analyst
- Barbara Csima, Canadian computability theorist, president of Canadian Mathematical Society
- Marianna Csörnyei (born 1975), Hungarian researcher in real analysis, geometric measure theory, and functional analysis
- Helen F. Cullen (1919–2007), American topologist
- Jane Cullum (born 1938), American applied mathematician known for her work in numerical algorithms and control theory
- Linda Cummings, British-American computational complex fluid dynamicist
- Louise Duffield Cummings (1870–1947), Canadian-American expert on Steiner triple systems
- María Cumplido (born 1992), Spanish geometric group theorist
- Susan Jane Cunningham (1842–1921), founded the mathematics and astronomy departments at Swarthmore College
- Serafina Cuomo (born 1966), Italian historian of ancient mathematics
- Antonella Cupillari (born 1955), Italian-American mathematics educator, historian of mathematics, and biographer of Agnesi
- Ruth F. Curtain (1941–2018), Australian-Dutch expert in infinite-dimensional linear systems
- Carina Curto (born 1978), American mathematical neuroscientist
- Eleanor P. Cushing (1856–1925), American mathematician
- Elizabeth Cuthill (1923–2011), American applied mathematician and Navy researcher known for sparse matrix ordering
- Annie Cuyt (born 1956), Belgian expert on approximation

== D ==
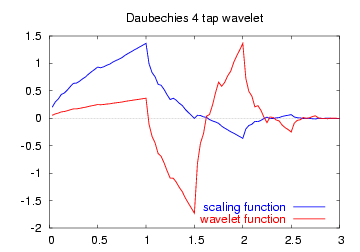
Ingrid Daubechies is known for her Daubechies wavelets.

- Sophie Dabo-Niang, Senegalese-French mathematician and statistician
- Susan D'Agostino, American mathematician and science writer
- Amy Dahan, French mathematician, historian of mathematics, and historian of the politics of climate change
- Mimi Dai, American expert in partial differential equations
- Karma Dajani, Lebanese-Dutch mathematician, applies ergodic theory to number theory
- Anne-Laure Dalibard, French mathematician, expert on fluid dynamics in oceanography
- Ewa Damek (born 1958), Polish mathematical analyst, namesake of Damek–Ricci spaces
- Danijela Damjanović, Serbian-Swedish dynamical systems theorist
- Pallavi Dani, Indian-American geometric group theorist
- Donatella Danielli (born 1966), Italian-American specialist in partial differential equations
- Sofia Danova (1879–1946), Bulgarian teacher and philanthropist, first Bulgarian woman to graduate in mathematics
- Christine Darden (born 1942), American aeronautical engineer who researches sonic booms
- Geraldine Claudette Darden (born 1936), one of the first African-American women to earn a PhD in mathematics
- Panagiota Daskalopoulos, Greek-American differential geometer
- Nilanjana Datta, Indian-born British quantum information theorist
- Ingrid Daubechies (born 1954), Belgian physicist and mathematician, known for wavelets
- Monique Dauge (born 1956), French mathematician and numerical analyst
- Chantal David (born 1964), Canadian analytic number theorist and arithmetic statistician
- Giuliana Davidoff, American number theorist and expert on expander graphs
- Penny J. Davies, Scottish expert on wave scattering, president of Edinburgh Mathematical Society
- Cristiana De Filippis (born 1992), Italian expert in regularity theory for partial differential equations
- Nicole De Grande-De Kimpe (1936–2008), Belgian pioneer in $p$-adic functional analysis
- Christine De Mol (born 1954), Belgian applied mathematician and mathematical physicist
- Ineke De Moortel, Belgian mathematician who studies the Sun's corona; president of Edinburgh Mathematical Society
- Valeria de Paiva, Brazilian researcher in categorical logic
- Lisette de Pillis, American researcher on the mathematics of cancer growth
- Kaye A. de Ruiz, American mathematics educator
- Daniela De Silva, Italian mathematician known for her expertise in partial differential equations
- Luz de Teresa (born 1965), Mexican control theorist, president of Mexican Mathematical Society
- Gerda de Vries, Canadian mathematician who studies dynamical systems and mathematical physiology
- Winifred Margaret Deans (1901–1990), British translator of German mathematics and physics texts into English
- Mary Deconge (1933–2025), one of the first African-American women to earn a PhD in mathematics
- Maria Deijfen (born 1975), Swedish graph theorist and probability theorist
- Huguette Delavault (1924–2003), French mathematical physicist, activist for women in mathematics
- Ermelinda DeLaViña, Hispanic American graph theorist
- Laura DeMarco, American researcher in dynamical systems and complex analysis
- Beryl May Dent (1900–1977), British mathematical physicist, researcher in molecular forces and computer-aided design
- Darinka Dentcheva, Bulgarian-American convex analyst
- Alicja Derkowska (born 1940), Polish social activist, mathematician and educator.
- Marjorie Devaney (1931–2007), mathematician, electrical engineer, and pioneering computer programmer
- Shakuntala Devi (1939–2013), Indian child prodigy, writer, and mental calculator
- Cécile DeWitt-Morette (1922–2017), French founder of l'École de physique des Houches
- Elena Deza (born 1961), French-Russian mathematician, author of books on figurate numbers and metric spaces
- Mariangiola Dezani-Ciancaglini (born 1946), Italian expert on type theory, lambda calculus, and programming language semantics
- Eleonora Di Nezza, Italian Kahler geometer
- Giulia Di Nunno (born 1973), Italian expert in stochastic analysis and financial mathematics, promoter of mathematics in Africa
- Sandra Di Rocco (born 1967), Italian-Swedish algebraic geometer
- Daniela di Serafino (1966–2022), Italian applied mathematician and numerical analyst
- Carrie Diaz Eaton, American mathematical biologist
- Auguste Dick (1910–1993), Austrian historian of mathematics and biographer of Emmy Noether
- Alicia Dickenstein (born 1955), Argentine algebraic geometer, vice-president of the International Mathematical Union
- Caren Diefenderfer (1952–2017), American mathematician, president of National Numeracy Network
- Susanne Dierolf (1942–2009), German expert on topological vector spaces
- Ada Dietz (1882–1950), American weaver who used algebraic expressions to design textiles
- Alice M. Dimick (1878–1956), American mathematician PhD
- Ulla Dinger (born 1955), Swedish mathematical analyst, first female doctorate in mathematics at University of Gothenburg
- Irit Dinur, Israeli researcher in probabilistically checkable proofs and hardness of approximation
- Serena Dipierro, Italian expert on partial differential equations
- Susanne Ditlevsen, Danish mathematical biologist and biostatistician
- Natasha Dobrinen, American set theorist and infinitary combinatorist
- Mary P. Dolciani (1923–1985), developed modern method for teaching high school algebra in the United States
- Yvonne Dold-Samplonius (1937–2014), Dutch historian of Islamic mathematics
- Valéria Neves Domingos Cavalcanti (born 1965), Brazilian expert on the control and stabilization of viscoelastic systems
- Rosa Donat (born 1960), Spanish mathematician, uses multiresolution methods for flows with shock waves and high Mach number
- Suzanne Dorée, American group theorist and mathematics educator
- Maria Rita D'Orsogna (born 1972), Italian and American applied mathematician and environmental activist
- Isabel Dotti, Argentine expert on homogeneous manifolds
- Itala D'Ottaviano (born 1944), Brazilian logician
- Yael Dowker (1919–2016), Israeli researcher in measure theory and ergodic theory
- Agnes Meyer Driscoll (1889–1971), American cryptanalyst during both World War I and World War II
- Kathy Driver, South African expert in special functions, orthogonal polynomials and approximation theory
- Suely Druck, Brazilian mathematician, president of Brazilian Mathematical Society
- Cornelia Druțu Romanian mathematician, won Whitehead Prize for research in geometric group theory
- Malgorzata Dubiel, Polish and Canadian mathematics educator
- Marie-Louise Dubreil-Jacotin (1905–1972), first woman full professor of mathematics in France, expert in fluid mechanics and abstract algebra
- Moon Duchin, American expert in geometric topology, geometric group theory, and Teichmüller theory
- Marie Duflo (1940–2019), French probability theorist, activist for foreigners in France
- Vida Dujmović (born 1972), Yugoslav-Canadian graph theorist
- Della Dumbaugh, American historian of mathematics, editor-in-chief of American Mathematical Monthly
- Ioana Dumitriu (born 1976), Romanian-American numerical analyst
- Julena Steinheider Duncombe (1911–2003), American mathematics teacher and astronomer
- Elizabeth B. Dussan V. (born 1946), American expert on the behavior of fluids
- Nira Dyn, Israeli expert on subdivision surfaces

== E ==
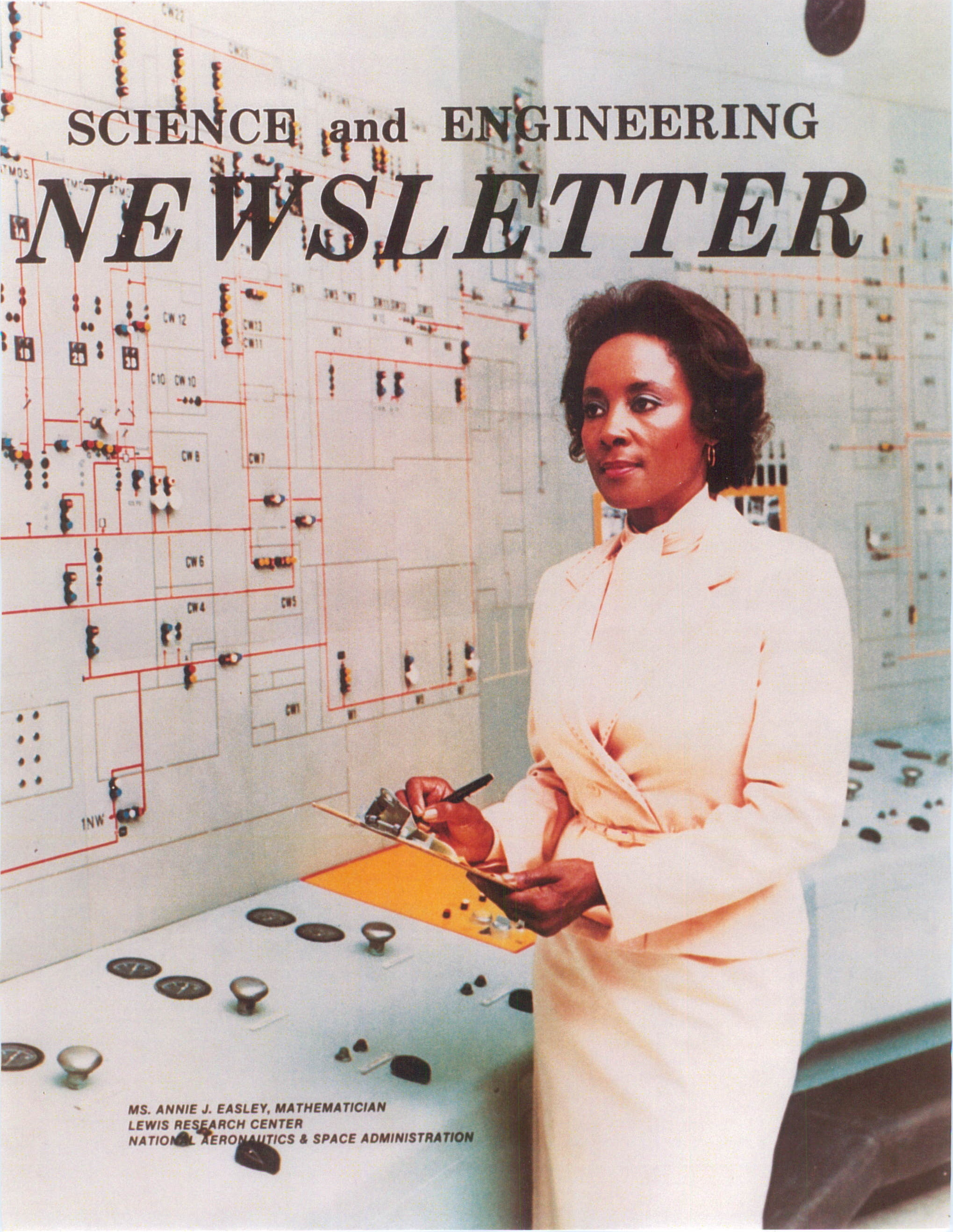
Annie Easley (1933–2011), human computer at NASA

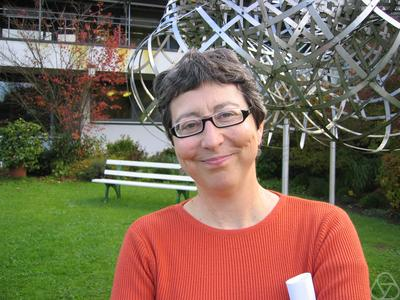
Maria J. Esteban, Basque-French applied mathematician, 2006

- Madeline Early (1912–2001), American mathematician and university professor.
- Annie Easley (1933–2011), African-American computer scientist, mathematician, and rocket scientist
- Sheila May Edmonds (1916–2002), British mathematician, Vice-Principal of Newnham College, Cambridge
- Josephine D. Edwards (1942–1985), Australian mathematician, founded Australian Mathematics Competition
- Mary Edwards (c. 1750–1815), human computer for the British Nautical Almanac
- Ranthony Edmonds, American postdoctoral algebraist
- Constance van Eeden (1927–2021), Dutch nonparameteric statistician who contributed to the development of statistics in Canada
- Hettie Belle Ege (1861–1942), American mathematician, acting president of Mills College
- Tatyana Pavlovna Ehrenfest (1905–1984), Dutch researcher in combinatorics and graph theory
- Andrée Ehresmann (1935–2026), French category theorist
- Gertrude Ehrlich (1923–2025), Austrian-American algebraist and number theorist
- Thyra Eibe (1866–1955), first woman to earn a mathematics degree from the University of Copenhagen, translator of Euclid
- Gabriele Eichfelder (born 1977), German applied mathematician, expert on vector-valued and set-valued optimization
- Bettina Eick (born 1968), German computational group theorist
- Ellen Eischen (born 1979), American number theorist
- Carolyn Eisele (1902–2000), American mathematician, historian of mathematics, expert on Charles Sanders Peirce
- Nathalie Eisenbaum, French probability theorist
- Kirsten Eisenträger, German-American researcher in computational number theory
- Tanja Eisner (born 1980), Ukrainian-German expert on operator theory
- Nicole El Karoui (born 1944), Tunisian-French pioneer in mathematical finance
- Amèle El Mahdi (born 1956), Algerian mathematics professor and writer
- Donna DeEtte Elbert (1928-2019), American human calculator, worked on differential equations modeling magnetohydrodynamics
- Nerida Ellerton (born 1942), Australian mathematics educator and historian of mathematics education
- Joanne Elliott (1925–2023), American mathematician specializing in potential theory
- Jo Ellis-Monaghan, American mathematician interested in graph polynomials and topological graph theory
- Maria Emelianenko, Russian-American expert on centroidal Voronoi tessellation
- Susan Empson, American scholar of mathematics education including childhood development of the concept of fractions
- Gisela Engeln-Müllges (1940–2026), escapee from East Germany, expert in numerical algorithms, and abstract artist
- Lyn English, Australian mathematics education scholar
- Susanna S. Epp (born 1943), American researcher in discrete mathematics and mathematical logic
- Karin Erdmann (born 1948), German researcher in modular representation theory and homological algebra
- Viveka Erlandsson, Swedish low-dimensional topologist and geometer
- Anna Erschler (born 1977), Russian-French expert on random walks on groups
- Hélène Esnault (born 1953), French algebraic geometer, winner of the Gottfried Wilhelm Leibniz Prize
- Malena Español, Argentine-American applied and computational mathematician, expert in regularization methods for discrete inverse problems
- Maria J. Esteban (born 1956), Basque-French applied mathematician, president of International Council for Industrial and Applied Mathematics
- Alison Etheridge FRS (born 1964), English researcher in theoretical population genetics and mathematical ecology
- Christina Eubanks-Turner, American mathematics educator, graph theorist, and commutative algebraist
- Bess Marie Eversull (1899–1978), first woman to earn a PhD in mathematics from the University of Cincinnati

== F ==
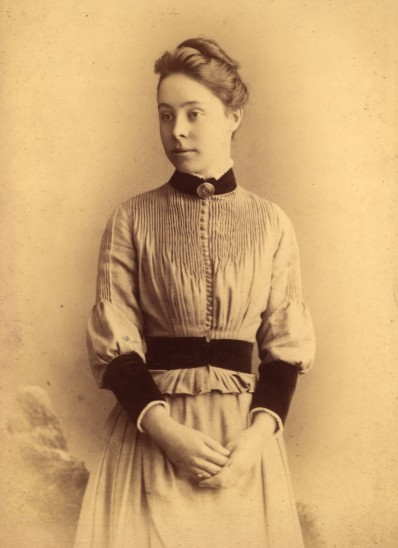
Philippa Fawcett gained international fame when she obtained the top score on the 1890 Mathematical Tripos at Cambridge.

- Marie Fabianová (1872–1943), Czech PhD mathematician, teacher and school principal, first female to graduate with a PhD in math from Charles University
- Cornelia Fabri (1869–1915), Italian mathematician, first woman to graduate in math from University of Pisa.
- Vera Faddeeva (1906–1983), Russian expert on numerical linear algebra
- Fariba Fahroo, Persian-American expert in pseudospectral optimal control, winner of AIAA Mechanics and Control of Flight Award
- Barbara Trader Faires (born 1943), American mathematician and textbook author, secretary of MAA
- Bianca Falcidieno, Italian applied mathematician, pioneer of semantics-driven shape modeling
- Etta Zuber Falconer (1933–2002), one of the first African-American women to receive a PhD in mathematics
- Ruma Falk (1932–2020), Israeli psychologist and philosopher of mathematics specializing in human understanding of probability
- María Falk de Losada, American-born Colombian mathematician, co-founded Colombian Mathematical Olympiad, rector of Antonio Nariño University
- Mary Fama (1938–2021), New Zealand applied mathematician, expert on rock deformation in mining
- Barbara Fantechi (born 1966), Italian algebraic geometer
- Rosa María Farfán, Mexican researcher in social epistemology and mathematics education
- Marie Farge (born 1953), French mathematician and physicist known for her research on wavelets and turbulence in fluid mechanics
- Fay Farnum (1888–1977), American mathematician, founding member of MAA
- Mary Celine Fasenmyer (1906–1996), Catholic nun whose research on hypergeometric functions prefigured WZ theory
- Heike Fassbender, German expert in numerical linear algebra, first woman to lead a German mathematical society
- Brittany Fasy, American computer scientist and applied mathematician focusing on topological data analysis
- Lisa Fauci (born 1960), American applied mathematician who applies computational fluid dynamics to biological processes
- Patricia Fauring, Argentine mathematician, coach of the Argentine mathematical olympiad team
- Odile Favaron (born 1938), French graph theorist
- Philippa Fawcett (1868–1948), English educationalist, first woman to obtain the top score in the Cambridge Mathematical Tripos
- Anita Burdman Feferman (1927–2015), American historian of mathematics and mathematical biographer
- Nina Fefferman, American mathematical biologist
- Eva-Maria Feichtner (born 1972), German algebraic geometer
- Joan Feigenbaum (born 1958), theoretical computer scientist, co-inventor of trust management
- Genevieve Grotjan Feinstein (1912–2006), helped decipher Japanese Purple cryptography, worked on Venona counter-intelligence
- Olivia Prosper Feldman, American applied mathematician, models the spread and dynamics of infectious diseases
- Käte Fenchel (1905–1983), Jewish German researcher on non-abelian groups
- Zhilan Feng (born 1959), Chinese-American applied mathematician, mathematical biologist, and epidemiologist
- Elizabeth Fennema (1928–2021), researched attitudes of young women towards mathematics and their classroom interactions
- Anuška Ferligoj (born 1947), Slovenian mathematical sociologist and researcher in network analysis
- Begoña Fernández, Mexican probability theorist and expert in mathematical finance
- Elena Fernández (born 1956), Spanish operations researcher, president of Association of European Operational Research Societies
- Isabel Fernández (born 1979), Spanish geometric analyst
- Marisa Fernández, Spanish differential geometer
- Jacqueline Ferrand (1918–2014), French researcher on conformal representation theory, potential theory, and Riemannian manifolds
- Lilia Ferrario, Italian and Australian applied mathematician and theoretical astrophysicist, expert on magnetic fields of stars
- Daniela Ferrero, Uruguayan and American graph theorist
- Antonia Ferrín Moreiras (1914–2009), Spanish mathematician and first Galician woman astronomer
- Joan Ferrini-Mundy (born 1954), American researcher in mathematics education
- Soheyla Feyzbakhsh, Iranian-British mathematician whose research connects algebraic geometry to string theory
- Judith V. Field (born 1943), British historian of mathematics and art
- Anna Fino, Italian differential geometer
- Jessica Fintzen, German p-adic representation theorist
- Farideh Firoozbakht (1962–2019), Iranian number theorist
- Ilse Fischer (born 1975), Austrian combinatorialist
- Irene Fischer (1907–2009), Austrian-American geodesist for Mercury and Apollo spaceflights, member of National Academy of Engineering
- Vera Fischer, Austrian set theorist and mathematical logician
- Naomi Fisher, American mathematics educator, worked to bring together research mathematicians and educators
- Mary Flahive (born 1948), American mathematician, author of books on difference equations and diophantine approximation
- Sarah Flannery (born 1982), winner of the EU Young Scientist of the Year Award for her teenage research on cryptography
- Erica Flapan (born 1956), American researcher in low-dimensional topology and knot theory
- Jennifer Flegg, Australian applied mathematician
- Irmgard Flügge-Lotz (1903–1974), German aerodynamics researcher, first female engineering professor at Stanford
- Natasha Flyer (born 1969), American earth scientist and applied mathematician, expert on radial basis functions
- Anne Bosworth Focke (1868–1907), first mathematics professor at what is now University of Rhode Island; student of David Hilbert
- Amanda Folsom (born 1979), American number theorist
- Irene Fonseca (born 1956), Portuguese-American director of the Center for Nonlinear Analysis at Carnegie Mellon University
- Liliana Forzani, Argentine applied mathematician and statistician, expert in dimensionality reduction
- Urszula Alicja Foryś (born 1965), Polish mathematical biologist and biomedical engineer
- Phyllis Fox (1923–2017), American mathematician and computer scientist, collaborator on the first LISP interpreter
- Marguerite Frank (1927–2024), French-American pioneer in convex optimization theory and mathematical programming
- Megan Loef Franke, American educational psychologist, studies the development of mathematical thought in childhood
- Johanna N. Y. Franklin, American expert on algorithmic randomness
- Hélène Frankowska, Polish-French control theorist and set-valued analyst
- Ailana Fraser, Canadian researcher on geometric analysis and the theory of minimal surfaces
- Elena Freda (1890–1978), Italian mathematician, applied mathematical analysis to electromagnetics and biology
- Haya Freedman (1923–2005), Israeli-British mathematician who studied the Tamari lattice and ring theory
- Herta Freitag (1908–2000), Austrian-American expert on Fibonacci numbers
- Nedda Friberti (born 1913), Italian mathematician, refugee from Nazi-occupied Italy
- Susan Friedlander (born 1946), English-American researcher in fluid dynamics, first female editor-in-chief of the Bulletin of the AMS
- Joyce Friedman (1928–2018), American mathematician, operations researcher, computer scientist, and computational linguist
- Aline Huke Frink (1904–2000), American mathematician and professor
- Charlotte Froese Fischer (1929–2024), Canadian-American expert on atomic-structure calculations who predicted negative calcium ions
- Cleota Gage Fry (1910–2001), American mathematician, physicist and university professor
- Hannah Fry (born 1984), English complex systems theorist and public speaker
- Shirley M. Frye, American mathematics educator, president of National Council of Teachers of Mathematics
- Elza Furtado Gomide (1925–2013), Brazilian mathematician, first female doctorate in mathematics at University of São Paulo
- Cohl Furey, Canadian mathematical physicist
- Fumiko Futamura, Japanese-American mathematician, expert on graphical perspective

== G ==
These planar shapes with the same spectrum, discovered in part by Carolyn S. Gordon, gave a negative answer to the old question "Can you hear the shape of a drum?"

The Gray graph, the smallest cubic semi-symmetric graph, was discovered by Marion Gray while she was working at AT&T.

- Lisl Gaal (1924–2024), Austrian-born American set theorist and Galois theorist
- Isabelle Gallagher (born 1973), French researcher in partial differential equations
- Eva Gallardo (born 1971), president of Spanish Mathematical Society
- Irene M. Gamba (born 1957), Argentine-American applied mathematician
- Svetlana Gannushkina (born 1942), Russian mathematician and human rights activist
- Nina Gantert, Swiss and German probability theorist
- Kseniya Garaschuk (born 1982), Soviet-born Canadian mathematics educator, editor of Crux Mathematicorum
- Pascale Garaud, French-American applied mathematician interested in fluid dynamics, magnetohydrodynamics, and their applications to astrophysics
- Yboon García Ramos, Peruvian mathematician focusing on mathematical optimization
- Laura Gardini (born 1952), Italian mathematician, applies chaotic dynamics to economics
- Manuela Garín (1914–2019), Spanish-born pioneer of Mexican mathematics
- Annie Marie Watkins Garraway (born 1940), American mathematician who worked in telecommunications and electronic data transmission
- Adriana Garroni (born 1966), Italian mathematician, expert on modeling plasticity and fracture
- Mary Cleophas Garvin (1899–1990), American mathematician
- Élisabeth Gassiat (born 1961), French mathematical statistician
- Karin Gatermann (1961–2005), German mathematician, researcher in symbolic computation and dynamical systems
- Geneviève Gauthier (born 1967), Canadian financial mathematician, statistician, and decision scientist
- Véronique Gayrard, French probability theorist
- Mai Gehrke (born 1964), Danish lattice theorist and mathematical logician
- Hilda Geiringer (1893–1973), Austrian researcher on Fourier series, statistics, probability, and plasticity, refugee from Nazi Germany
- Anne Gelb, American mathematician interested in numerical analysis, partial differential equations, and Fourier analysis of images
- Sue Geller, American mathematician with interdisciplinary interests in algebraic K-theory, bioinformatics, and biostatistics
- Hélyette Geman, French researcher in mathematical finance
- Ruth Gentry (1862–1917), American geometer
- Sommer Gentry, American mathematician, applies dance notation to haptic interaction and operations research to organ transplants
- Penka Georgieva, expert on enumerative geometry, symplectic topology, and Gromov–Witten invariants
- Maria-Pia Geppert (1907–1997), German mathematician and biostatistician who founded the Biometrical Journal
- Ralucca Gera, American graph theorist and mathematics educator
- Marlies Gerber, American ergodic theorist and descriptive set theorist
- Teena Gerhardt (born 1980), American algebraic geometer
- Sophie Germain (1776–1831), French number theorist, physicist, and philosopher, correspondent of Gauss
- Marie Gernet (1865–1924), first German woman to earn a doctorate in mathematics
- Nadeschda Gernet (1877–1943), Russian mathematician, student of David Hilbert, worked in the calculus of variations
- Judith Gersting (born 1940), American mathematician, computer scientist, and textbook author
- Ellen Gethner, American graph theorist
- Patrizia Gianni (born 1952), Italian expert in computer algebra
- E. Glenadine Gibb (1919–1984), American mathematics education researcher, president of National Council of Teachers of Mathematics
- Danuta Gierulanka (1909–1995), Polish mathematics educator and philosopher of mathematics
- Irène Gijbels, Belgian mathematical statistician and expert in nonparametric statistics
- Olga Gil Medrano (born 1956), Spanish geometric analyst, first female president of the Royal Spanish Mathematical Society
- Anna C. Gilbert (born 1972), American expert in streaming algorithms and matching pursuit
- Jane Piore Gilman (born 1945), topologist and group theorist, distinguished professor of mathematics at Rutgers University
- Gloria Ford Gilmer, American ethnomathematician
- Joella Gipson (1929–2012), American music educator and mathematics educator, first African-American student at Mt. St. Mary's College
- Vivette Girault (born 1943), French expert on numerical analysis, finite element methods, and computational fluid dynamics
- E. G. Glagoleva (1926–2015), Soviet and Russian mathematician, mathematics educator, and textbook author
- Josephine Burns Glasgow (1887–1969), American group theorist, active in American Association of University Women
- Muriel Glauert (1892–1949), British mathematician and aerodynamicist
- Sarah Glaz (born 1947), Romanian-Israeli-American commutative algebraist and mathematical poet
- Heide Gluesing-Luerssen (born 1961), German mathematician specializing in algebraic coding theory
- Julia Gog, English mathematical biologist, uses mathematics to study the spread of infectious diseases
- Linda Gojak, American mathematics educator, president of National Council of Teachers of Mathematics
- Nüzhet Gökdoğan (1910–2003), Turkish astronomer and mathematician, founder of Turkish Mathematical Society
- Bonnie Gold (born 1948), American mathematician, mathematical logician, philosopher of mathematics, and mathematics educator
- Lisa Goldberg, American mathematical finance scholar and statistician
- Mildred Ginsberg Goldberger (1923–2006), American computer and economist lecturer
- Rebecca Goldin, American expert in symplectic geometry
- Jennie Golding, British mathematician who focuses on mathematics education policy
- Christina Goldschmidt, British probability theorist
- Catherine Goldstein (born 1958), French number theorist and historian of mathematics
- Gisèle Ruiz Goldstein (born 1958), American expert in partial differential equations, operator theory, and mathematical finance
- Susan Goldstine, American mathematician active in mathematics and fiber arts
- Shafi Goldwasser (born 1958), American-born Israeli theoretical cryptographer
- Concha Gómez, Italian and Cuban-American mathematician and advocate for diversity in STEM
- Patricia Gonçalves, Portuguese probability theorist
- Sherry Gong, second American gold medal winner at International Mathematical Olympiad
- Enriqueta González Baz (1915–2002), first woman to earn a mathematics degree in Mexico, founder of the Mexican Mathematical Society
- Valentina Gorbachuk (born 1937), Ukrainian operator theorist
- Maria Gordina (born 1968), Russian-American mathematical analyst
- Carolyn S. Gordon (born 1950), isospectral geometer who proved that you can't hear the shape of a drum
- Julia Gordon, Canadian representation theorist, winner of Michler and Krieger–Nelson prizes
- Pamela Gorkin, American complex analyst and textbook author
- Sigal Gottlieb, American expert in numerical simulation of the partial differential equations used in aerodynamics
- Aline Gouget (born 1977), French cryptographer
- Mary de Lellis Gough (1892–1983), American mathematician
- Alice Bache Gould (1858–1953), American mathematician and historian
- Gene Grabeel (1920–2015), American mathematician and cryptanalyst who founded the Venona project
- Judith Grabiner (born 1938), American historian of 18th- and 19th-century mathematics
- Eva-Maria Graefe, German-English mathematical physicist, expert in ultracold atoms and Non-Hermitian quantum mechanics
- Christine Graffigne (born 1959), French expert on Markov random fields for image analysis
- Maria Gramegna (1887–1915), Italian mathematician, pioneer of abstraction in functional analysis
- Evelyn Boyd Granville (1924–2023), one of the first African-American women to receive a PhD in mathematics
- Antonella Grassi, mathematician specializing in algebraic geometry and string theory
- Mary Graustein (1884–1972), American mathematician, first mathematical doctorate from Radcliffe College
- Marion Cameron Gray (1902–1979), Scottish telephone engineer, discoverer of the Gray graph
- Mary W. Gray (born 1939), author on mathematics, mathematics education, economic equity, discrimination law, and academic freedom
- Judy Green (born 1943), logician and historian of women in mathematics
- Anne Greenbaum (born 1951), American expert in theoretical and numerical linear algebra
- Catherine Greenhill, Australian graph theorist
- Sarah J. Greenwald, American mathematician, studies connections between mathematics and society
- Cindy Greenwood (born 1937), Canadian statistician, winner of Krieger-Nelson Prize
- Sina Greenwood, New Zealand topologist
- Ruth Gregory, British mathematical physicist specializing in general relativity and cosmology
- Margaret Greig (1922–1999), English applied mathematician, developed theory for worsted spinning
- Harriet Griffin (1903–1991), American mathematician, author of a textbook on number theory
- Lois Wilfred Griffiths (1899–1981), American expert on polygonal numbers
- Laura Grigori, French applied mathematician, known for communication-avoiding algorithms for numerical linear algebra
- Ellina Grigorieva, Russian expert on mathematical problem solving
- Elisenda Grigsby, American low-dimensional topologist
- Clara Grima (born 1971), Spanish computational geometer, co-discoverer of scutoids, mathematics popularizer
- Margaret Grimshaw (1905–1990), English mathematician at Cambridge and author on Hilbert spaces
- Birgit Grodal (1943–2004), Danish mathematical economist, studied atomless economies
- Ione Grogan (1891–1961), American schoolteacher, mathematics professor, and literary club leader
- Edna Grossman, German-born American designer of the Data Encryption Standard and of the slide attack in cryptography
- Marcia Groszek, American mathematician whose research concerns mathematical logic, set theory, forcing, and recursion theory
- Gerd Grubb (born 1939), Danish expert on pseudodifferential operators
- Helen G. Grundman, American number theorist
- Weiqing Gu, Chinese-American researcher on differential geometry and the mathematics of cancer growth
- Rebeca Guber (1926–2020), Argentine mathematician, founder of Argentine Calculation Society
- Christine Guenther, American expert on the Ricci flow
- Laura Guggenbühl (1901–1985), American mathematician known for her work in triangle geometry and the history of mathematics
- Colette Guillopé, French researcher in partial differential equations and fluid dynamics, former president of femmes et mathématiques
- Joséphine Guidy Wandja (born 1945), Ivorian mathematician
- Alice Guionnet (born 1969), French probability theorist
- Geneviève Guitel (1895–1982), French mathematician who studied natural-language numbering systems
- Xin Guo, Chinese and American operations researcher, applied mathematician, and financial engineer
- Kanta Gupta (1938–2016), Indian-Canadian researcher on abstract algebra and group theory
- Neena Gupta, Indian mathematician who solved the Zariski cancellation problem
- Rona Gurkewitz, American mathematician and computer scientist known for her work on modular origami
- Margaret Gurney (1908–2002), American mathematician, survey statistician, and pioneering computer programmer
- Rochelle Gutierrez, American education theorist who studies the impacts of race, class and language on mathematics education
- Simone Gutt (born 1956), Belgian differential geometer
- Martha Guzmán Partida, Mexican functional analyst

== H ==
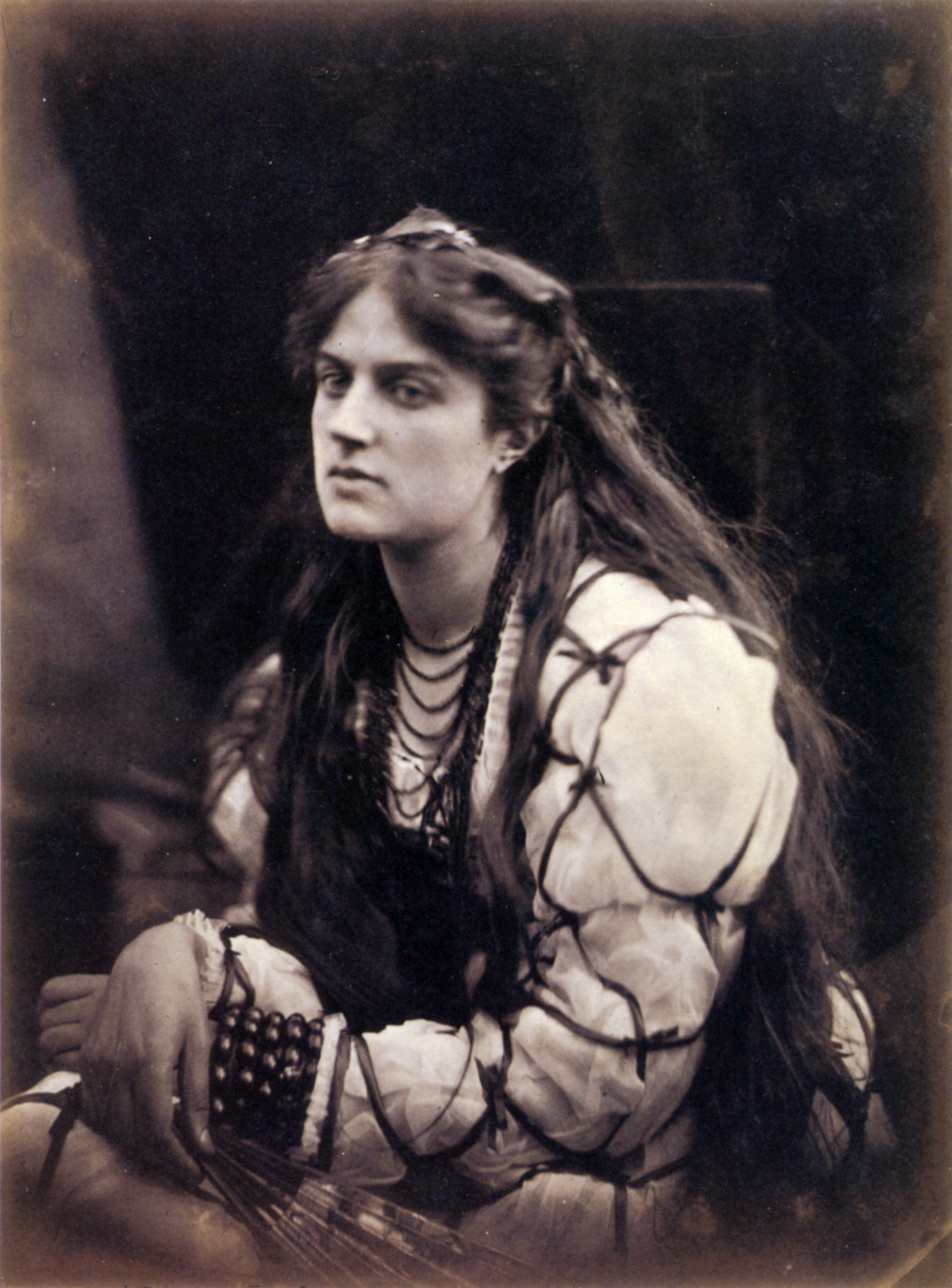
Ancient Greek Egyptian mathematician Hypatia was the subject of many literary interpretations in the 19th and 20th centuries. Here, she is portrayed by Marie Spartali in an 1867 photograph by Julia Margaret Cameron.

- Bénédicte Haas (born 1976), French probability theorist
- Ruth Haas, American mathematician known for mentorship of other women mathematicians
- Violet B. Haas (1926–1986), American control theorist
- Naomi Habib, Israeli computational neuroscientist who researches genomics and genome engineering
- Olga Hadžić (1946–1995), Serbian expert on fixed-point theorems
- Dörte Haftendorn (born 1948), German mathematician, mathematics educator, and textbook author
- Kari Hag (born 1941), Norwegian expert on quasiconformal mappings
- Elisabeth Hagemann (born 1906), early German female doctorate in mathematics
- Marjorie Hahn (born 1948), American probability theorist and tennis player
- Deborah Tepper Haimo (1921–2007), Ukrainian-Palestinian-American classical analyst, third female president of the Mathematical Association of America
- Susie W. Håkansson (born 1940), mathematics educator, director of the California Mathematics Project
- Ursula Hamenstädt (born 1961), German differential geometry
- Christine Hamill (1923–1956), English mathematician specializing in group theory and finite geometry
- Mary-Elizabeth Hamstrom (1927–2009), American topologist
- Xiaoying Han, Chinese mathematician who studies random dynamical systems and stochastic differential equations
- Gila Hanna (born 1934), Canadian mathematics educator and philosopher of mathematics
- Anita Hansbo (born 1960), Swedish mathematician, rector of Jönköping University
- Megumi Harada, Canadian expert on equivariant symplectic and algebraic geometry
- Eleonor Harboure (1948–2022), first woman president of the Argentina Mathematical Union
- Alison Harcourt (born 1929), Australian mathematician and statistician known for branch and bound algorithms and quantification of poverty in Australia
- Frances Hardcastle (1866–1941), group theorist, one of the founders of the American Mathematical Society
- Kathryn E. Hare (born 1959), Canadian expert in harmonic analysis
- Valentina Harizanov, Serbian-American researcher in computability and model theory
- Dorothee Haroske (born 1968), German expert on function spaces
- Heather Harrington (born 1984), applied mathematician and algebraic systems biologist
- Leona Harris, American mathematician and diversity activist
- Pamela E. Harris, Mexican combinatorist and mathematics blogger
- Jenny Harrison, American expert on generalized functions and minimal surfaces
- Frances Harshbarger (1902–1987), one of the first female American mathematicians to receive a doctorate
- Bertha Hart, American mathematician
- Sarah B. Hart, British group theorist
- Shelly Harvey, American researcher in knot theory, low-dimensional topology, and group theory
- Mary Gertrude Haseman (1889–1979), American knot theorist
- Asma Hassannezhad, Iranian spectral geometer
- Maria Hasse (1921–2014), German graph theorist, set theorist, and category theorist, first female professor in science at TU Dresden
- Rhonda Hatcher, American number theorist, winner of Haimo teaching award
- Deanna Haunsperger, American mathematician, former president of the Mathematical Association of America
- Jane M. Hawkins, American researcher in dynamic systems, complex dynamics, cellular automata, and Julia sets
- Louise Hay (1935–1989), founding member of the Association for Women in Mathematics
- Linda B. Hayden (born 1949), African-American mathematics educator and mathematical geoscientist known for mentorship of women and minorities
- Ellen Hayes (1851–1930), American mathematician, astronomer, and political radical
- Margaret Hayman (1923–1994), British mathematics educator, co-founder of British Mathematical Olympiad
- Euphemia Lofton Haynes (1890–1980), first African-American woman to earn a PhD in mathematics
- Nola Anderson Haynes (1897–1996), American mathematician, professor
- Sarah D. Allen Oren Haynes (1836–1907), first female state librarian of Indiana and first female faculty member at Purdue University
- Teresa W. Haynes (born 1953), American expert on domination in graphs
- Emilie Virginia Haynsworth (1916–1985), American linear algebraist known for Schur complements and Haynsworth inertia additivity formula
- Olive Hazlett (1890–1974), American algebraist at the University of Illinois
- Sandra Mitchell Hedetniemi (born 1949), American researcher in graph theory and graph algorithms
- Maria Heep-Altiner (born 1959), German mathematician and actuary
- Jane Heffernan, Canadian mathematician who studies mathematical models for the spread of infectious disease
- Katherine Heinrich (born 1954), Canadian combinatorialist, first female president of Canadian Mathematical Society
- Christine Heitsch, American expert on the mathematics of RNA structure
- Diane Henderson, American applied mathematician and experimental fluid dynamics researcher
- Nadia Heninger (born 1982), American cryptographer, computer security expert, and computational number theorist
- Cora Barbara Hennel (1888–1947), American mathematician, first woman to earn a doctorate in mathematics at the Indiana University
- Dagmar R. Henney (1931–2023), German-American expert on additive set-values and Banach spaces
- Inge Henningsen (born 1941), statistician, writer and feminist
- Allison Henrich (born 1980), American knot theorist
- Shandelle Henson (born 1964), American mathematician and mathematical biologist, expert on population dynamics
- Rebecca A. Herb (born 1948), American researcher in abstract algebra and Lie groups
- Raphaèle Herbin, French expert on the finite volume method
- Grete Hermann (1901–1984), German mathematician and philosopher also noted for her work in physics and education
- Susan Hermiller, American group theorist
- Norma Hernández (born 1934), American mathematics educator, studied factors affecting Mexican-American mathematics students
- Constance Anne Herschel (1855–1939), British lecturer in natural sciences and mathematics
- Patricia Hersh (born 1973), American expert on algebraic and topological combinatorics
- Bobby Hersom (born 1929), British mathematician and computer scientist
- Kathryn Hess (born 1967), American mathematician who uses algebraic topology to understand structures in neurology and materials science
- Silvia Heubach, German-American mathematician specializing in enumerative combinatorics, combinatorial game theory, and bioinformatics
- Gloria Conyers Hewitt (born 1935), early African-American female mathematics PhD, MAA governor
- Laurie Heyer, American mathematician specializing in genomics and bioinformatics
- Patricia Hiddleston (1933–2017), Scottish and Rhodesian mathematician
- Aparna Higgins, Indian-American graph theorist known for encouraging undergraduate research
- Raegan Higgins, American mathematician, co-director of the EDGE program for Women
- Poh Wah Hillock, Singaporean and Australian mathematician, Australian University Teacher of the Year
- Nancy Hingston, American differential geometer
- Wei Ho, American arithmetic geometer
- Hoàng Xuân Sính (born 1933), first female Vietnamese mathematician, student of Grothendieck, founder of Thang Long University
- Catherine Hobbs (born 1968), British singularity theorist, applies geometry to robotics
- Dorit S. Hochbaum (born 1949), American expert on approximation algorithms for facility location, covering and packing, and scheduling
- Marlis Hochbruck (born 1964), German expert on matrix exponentials and their applications to differential equations
- Angie Hodge-Zickerman, American mathematics educator and ultramarathon runner
- Maria Hoffmann-Ostenhof (born 1947), Austrian expert on the Schrödinger equation
- Leslie Hogben, American mathematician specializing in graph theory and linear algebra, known for graduate mentorship
- Nina Holden, Norwegian probability theorist
- Judy A. Holdener (born 1965), American number theorist who simplified the proof of Touchard's theorem on perfect numbers
- Barbara R. Holland (born 1976), New Zealand born Australian phylogeneticist
- Lotte Hollands (born 1981), Dutch mathematical physicist
- Tara S. Holm, American algebraic geometer and symplectic geometer
- Olga Holtz (born 1973), Russian numerical analyst, winner of the European Mathematical Society Prize
- Betty W. Holz (1919–2005), American mathematician and defense analyst
- Jennifer Hom, American low-dimensional topologist
- Dorothy McFadden Hoover (1918–2000), American human computer involved in the design of swept-wing aircraft
- Grace Hopper (1906–1992), American computer scientist and United States Navy rear admiral
- Eleanor Mollie Horadam (1921–2002), English-Australian mathematician, studied generalized integers, mother of Kathy
- Kathy Horadam (born 1951), Australian mathematician, studies Hadamard matrices, daughter of Eleanor Mollie
- Annick Horiuchi, French historian of Japanese mathematics
- Anette Hosoi, American mechanical engineer, biophysicist, and mathematician, studies fluid dynamics, robotics, and bio-inspired design
- Victoria Howle, American expert in numerical linear algebra, founded AWM essay contest
- Susan Howson (born 1973), British mathematician known for work on algebraic number theory and arithmetic geometry
- Rebecca Hoyle, British applied mathematician, expert on pattern formation
- Celia Hoyles (born 1946), British mathematician, president of the Institute of Mathematics and its Applications
- Christine Hrenya, American computational fluid dynamicist, expert in fluidization and multiphase flow
- Pao-sheng Hsu, Mathematics educator, founder of AWM Teacher Partnership Program
- Hu Hesheng (1928–2024), differential geometer, president of Shanghai Mathematical Society, member of Chinese Academy of Science
- Lan-Hsuan Huang, Taiwanese-American geometric analyst and relativity theorist
- Katharina T. Huber (born 1965), German mathematical biologist, expert in the foundations and visualization of phylogeny
- Verena Huber-Dyson (1923–2016), Swiss-American group theorist and logician, expert on undecidability in group theory
- Annette Huber-Klawitter (born 1967), German algebraic geometer, expert in the Bloch–Kato conjectures
- Vera Huckel, American human computer at the National Advisory Committee for Aeronautics
- Anne Lester Hudson, American expert in topological semigroups, mathematics educator, and mathematics competition coach
- Hilda Phoebe Hudson (1881–1965), English researcher on Cremona transformations in algebraic geometry
- Sabine Van Huffel (born 1958), Belgian applied mathematician, expert on total least squares and applications to medical diagnostics
- Cynthia Huffman, American commutative algebraist, historian of mathematics, and ethnomathematician
- Rhonda Hughes (born 1947), American wavelet researcher, president of the Association for Women in Mathematics
- Gerunda Hughes (born 1951), American scholar of education focusing on educational assessment in mathematics
- Deborah Hughes Hallett, mathematics education reformer
- Birge Huisgen-Zimmermann (born 1946), German-American representation theorist and ring theorist
- Dominique Hulin (born 1959), French differential geometer
- Mabel Gweneth Humphreys (1911–2006), Canadian-American number theorist and namesake of the M. Gweneth Humphreys Award
- Eugénie Hunsicker, American mathematician who works at the intersection of analysis, geometry and topology
- Fern Hunt (born 1948), American mathematician known for her work in applied mathematics and mathematical biology
- Bobbie Hunter, New Zealand educational theorist and mathematics educator
- Louise Stokes Hunter (died 1988), American mathematics educator, first African-American woman with a degree from the University of Virginia
- Joan Hutchinson (born 1945), American graph theorist who extended the planar separator theorem to graphs of higher genus
- Marie Hušková (born 1942), Czech mathematician who worked in theoretical statistics and change-point problems
- Hypatia (died 415), head of the Neoplatonic school at Alexandria, murdered by a Christian mob

== I ==
- Mikaela Iacobelli, Italian expert in dynamic particle systems and partial differential equations
- Milagros D. Ibe (1931–2023), Filipino mathematics educator, vice chancellor of the University of the Philippines Diliman
- Rosalie Iemhoff (born 1969), Dutch logician
- Mihaela Ifrim, Romanian-American mathematical analyst
- Mihaela Ignatova, Bulgarian mathematical analyst
- Marina Iliopoulou, Greek harmonic analyst and discrete geometer
- Annette Imhausen (born 1970), German historian of ancient Egyptian mathematics
- Helen Infeld (1907–1993), American-born mathematics professor who fled to Poland because of McCarthyism
- Tasha Inniss, first African-American woman to earn a Ph.D. from the University of Maryland, director of education for INFORMS
- Eleny Ionel, Romanian-American symplectic geometer
- Alessandra Iozzi (born 1959), Italian-American-Swiss geometric group theorist
- Ilse Ipsen, German-American expert in numerical linear algebra
- Valerie Isham (born 1947), British applied probabilist, president of Royal Statistical Society
- Shihoko Ishii (born 1950), Japanese mathematician specializing in algebraic geometry
- Vanaja Iyengar ( –2001), founding vice chancellor of Sri Padmavati Mahila Visvavidyalayam, a women's university in Andhra Pradesh, India

== J ==
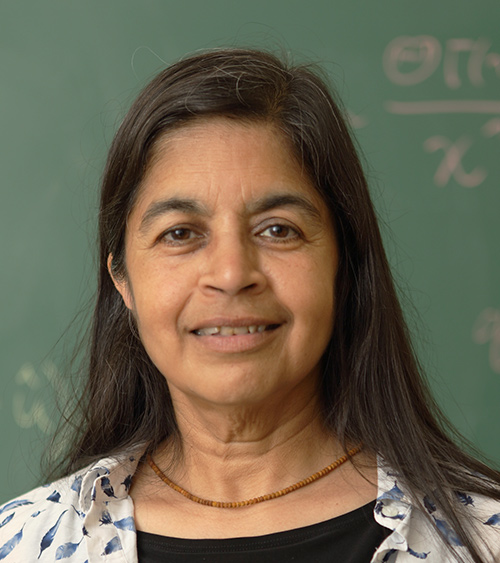
Australian mathematician Nalini Joshi

- Trachette Jackson (born 1972), researcher in mathematical oncology, second African-American woman to become a Sloan Fellow in mathematics
- Jessie Marie Jacobs (1890–1954), fired from mathematics instructorship for having a child, aided husband Hermann Muller's Nobel-winning genetic research
- Alex James, British and New Zealand applied mathematician, mathematical biologist, and epidemiologist
- Cathérine Jami (born 1961), French historian of Chinese mathematics
- Jeannette Janssen, Dutch and Canadian graph theorist
- Maarit Järvenpää, Finnish mathematician specializing in fractal geometry, geometric measure theory, and dynamical systems
- Monique Jeanblanc (born 1947), French financial mathematician
- Lisa Jeffrey FRSC, Canadian expert in symplectic geometry and quantum field theory
- Erica Jen, American applied mathematician, studies mathematical analysis of chaotic and complex behavior
- Carrie Ichikawa Jenkins, Canadian philosopher of mathematics
- Jacqueline Jensen-Vallin, American low-dimensional topologist, editor of MAA FOCUS
- Svetlana Jitomirskaya (born 1966), Ukrainian mathematician working on dynamical systems and mathematical physics
- Naomi Jochnowitz, American algebraic number theorist known for her mentorship of women in mathematics
- Aimee Johnson, American expert on dynamical systems
- Katherine Johnson (1918–2020), calculated the trajectory for Project Mercury and the 1969 Apollo 11 flight to the Moon
- Marion Lee Johnson, African-American mathematician, helped calculate trajectories for the Apollo 11 Moon landing
- Roberta Frances Johnson (1902–1988), American mathematics educator
- Antonia J. Jones (1943–2010), British mathematician and computer scientist
- Eleanor Jones (1929–2021), one of the first African American women to receive a PhD in mathematics
- Shelly M. Jones, American mathematics educator
- Nataša Jonoska (born 1961), Macedonian-American expert in DNA computing
- Kerstin Jordaan, president of South African Mathematical Society
- Artishia Wilkerson Jordan (1901–1974), African-American mathematics educator and clubwoman
- Nicole M. Joseph, American scholar of mathematics education focusing on the experiences of African-American women and girls in mathematics
- Nalini Joshi, researcher in differential equations, Australian Laureate Fellow, Hardy Lecturer, president of Australian Mathematical Society
- Josephine Jue, Chinese-American mathematician, compiler, and programmer, first Asian-American woman at NASA

== K ==
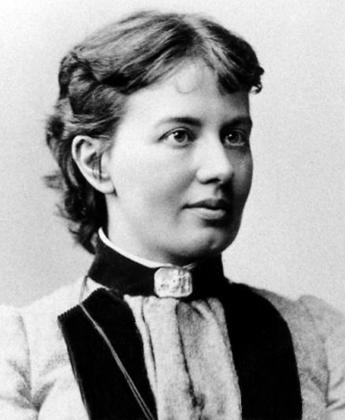
Sofya Kovalevskaya is known for her contributions to differential equations, and gives her name to the Cauchy-Kovalevskaya theorem, the fundamental existence result for analytic partial differential equations.

- Josephine Wairimu Kagunda, Kenyan applied mathematician and epidemiologist
- Margarethe Kahn (1880–c. 1942), one of the first female German doctorates, contributed to Hilbert's sixteenth problem
- Suzan Kahramaner (1913–2006), one of the first female mathematicians in Turkish academia
- Delaram Kahrobaei, Iranian-American applied algebraist and post-quantum cryptographer
- Gabriele Kaiser, German mathematics educator
- Nataliya Kalashnykova, Soviet-Mexican expert on bilevel optimization
- Efstratia Kalfagianni, Greek-American topologist
- Eva Kallin, American researcher in geometric axiom systems, functional algebra, and polynomial convexity
- Gudrun Kalmbach (born 1937), German quantum logician
- Anne-Sophie Kaloghiros, French algebraic geometer
- Barbara Kaltenbacher, Austrian applied analyst, president of Austrian Mathematical Society
- Hermine Agavni Kalustyan (1914–1989), Armenian-Turkish mathematician and politician
- Constance Kamii (died 2023), Swiss-Japanese-American mathematics education scholar and psychologist
- Shoshana Kamin (born 1930), Soviet-Israeli mathematical physicist, wrote about parabolic partial differential equations
- Rosella Kanarik (1909–2014), American mathematics professor and educator
- Mihyun Kang, South Korean graph theorist
- Chiu-Yen Kao (born 1974), Taiwanese-American expert in image processing and mathematical biology
- Gizem Karaali, Turkish representation theorist, founding editor of Journal of Humanistic Mathematics
- Mary Cordia Karl (1893–1984), American geometer
- Carol Karp (1926–1972), American researcher on infinitary logic, viola player
- Yael Karshon (born 1964), Israeli-Canadian expert on symplectic geometry
- Elaine Kasimatis, American discrete geometer and mathematics educator
- Haya Kaspi (born 1948), Israeli probability theorist
- Fanny Kassel (born 1984), French expert on Lie groups
- Svetlana Katok (born 1947), Russian-American founder of Electronic Research Announcements of the AMS
- Yoshie Katsurada (1911–1980), Japanese differential geometer, first Japanese woman with a doctorate or professorship in mathematics
- Bruria Kaufman (1918–2010), Israeli theoretical physicist who collaborated with Einstein on general relativity
- Kathleen Kavanagh, American mathematician, applies simulation-based engineering to water quality and sustainability
- Elham Kazemi (born 1970), Iranian-American mathematics educator
- Mercy Kazima, established Malawi's first doctoral program in mathematics education
- Ailsa Keating, British symplectic geometer
- Rinat Kedem (born 1965), American mathematician and mathematical physicist
- Linda Keen (born 1940), American mathematician and computer scientist, president of AWM
- Lyudmila Keldysh (1904–1976), Russian set theorist and geometric topologist
- Ruth Kellerhals (born 1957), Swiss expert on hyperbolic geometry, geometric group theory and polylogarithm identities
- Christine Kelley, American coding theorist, director of Project NExT
- Julia Kempe, French, German, and Israeli researcher in quantum computing
- Claribel Kendall (1889–1965), one of the founders of the Rocky Mountain Section of the MAA
- Juliette Kennedy, mathematical logician in Finland
- Patricia Clark Kenschaft (born 1940), American mathematician, prolific book author, and activist for equity and diversity
- Autumn Kent, American mathematician specializing in topology and geometry, promoter of transgender rights
- Deborah Kent (born 1978), American historian of mathematics
- Leah Keshet, Israeli-Canadian mathematical biologist, first female president of the Society for Mathematical Biology
- Radha Kessar, Indian mathematician known for her research in the representation theory of finite groups
- Jennifer Key, South African mathematician, expert on group theory, finite geometry, combinatorial designs, and coding theory
- Barbara Keyfitz (born 1944), Canadian-American researcher on nonlinear partial differential equations, president of AWM and ICIAM
- Lily Khadjavi, American mathematician, author on mathematics for social justice
- 'Mamphono Khaketla (born 1960), Lesotho mathematician, senator, and finance minister
- Olga Kharlampovich (born 1958), Russian-Canadian group theorist who solved the Tarski conjecture on first-order theories of free groups
- Carolyn Kieran, Canadian mathematics educator
- Anna Kiesenhofer (born 1991), Austrian cyclist and mathematical physicist
- Misha Kilmer, American applied mathematician known for research in numerical linear algebra and scientific computing
- Eun Jung Kim, South Korean researcher in parameterized complexity and graph width
- Inwon Kim, Korean-American expert on partial differential equations
- Ju-Lee Kim (born 1969), Korean-American expert on the representation theory of p-adic groups
- Chawne Kimber (born 1971), African-American mathematician and quilter, incorporates social justice into mathematics teaching
- Amy C. King (1928–2014), American mathematics educator
- Angie Turner King (1905–2004), American mathematics and chemistry educator
- Karen D. King (1971–2019), African-American mathematics educator and Falconer Lecturer
- L. Christine Kinsey, American topologist and textbook author
- Faina Mihajlovna Kirillova (1931–2024), Belarusian optimal control theorist
- Vivien Kirk, New Zealand dynamical systems theorist, president of New Zealand Mathematical Society
- Ellen Kirkman, American algebraist
- Denise Kirschner, American mathematical biologist and immunologist
- Frances Kirwan (born 1959), British specialist in algebraic and symplectic geometry
- Virginia Kiryakova, Bulgarian mathematician, expert on fractional calculus and special functions
- Jane Kister, British-American mathematical logician, editor of Mathematical Reviews
- Tinne Hoff Kjeldsen, Danish researcher in mathematics education and the philosophy and history of mathematics
- Kathrin Klamroth (born 1968), German expert on combinatorial optimization and facility location
- Erica Klarreich (born 1972), American geometer and writer
- Maria Klawe (born 1951), Canadian-American theoretical computer scientist, president of Harvey Mudd College
- Caroline Klivans, American algebraic combinatorist, expert on chip-firing games
- Małgorzata Klimek (born 1957), Polish mathematician, expert on fractional calculus
- Genevieve M. Knight (1939–2021), African-American mathematics educator
- Julia F. Knight, American specialist in model theory and computability theory
- Sarah Koch (born 1979), American complex analyst and complex dynamicist
- Henna Koivusalo (born 1985), Finnish expert on dynamical systems, fractal geometry, and quasicrystals
- Eleanor Krawitz Kolchin (1927–2019), American mathematician, programmer, and astronomer, calculated orbits for the Apollo program
- Tamara G. Kolda, American applied mathematician at Sandia National Laboratories
- Natalia Komarova, Russian-American mathematician, studies cancer, language, gun control, pop music, and other complex systems
- Nancy Kopell (born 1942), American researcher in the dynamics of the nervous system
- Elaine Koppelman (1937–2019), American mathematician
- Maria Korovina (born 1962), Russian research on functional spaces and differential equations
- Marianne Korten, Argentine-German mathematician specializing in partial differential equations
- Yvette Kosmann-Schwarzbach (born 1941), French differential geometer, namesake of the Kosmann lift
- Ekaterina Kostina, Belarusian-German expert on nonlinear optimization
- Motoko Kotani (born 1960), Japanese discrete geometric analyst and academic administrator
- Sofya Kovalevskaya (1850–1891), first major Russian female mathematician, worked in analysis, differential equations and mechanics
- Bryna Kra (born 1966), American mathematician who applies dynamical systems in number theory and combinatorics
- Edna Kramer (1902–1984), American mathematician and author of mathematics books
- Gunilla Kreiss (born 1958), Swedish numerical analyst
- Cecilia Krieger (1894–1974), third person and first woman to earn a Canadian mathematics PhD, translator of Sierpiński
- Holly Krieger, American dynamical systems theorist
- Anna Zofia Krygowska (1904–1988), Polish mathematician known for her work in mathematics education
- Ewa Kubicka, Polish-American graph theorist and actuarial scientist
- Vera Kublanovskaya (1920–2012), Russian inventor of the QR algorithm for computing eigenvalues and eigenvectors
- Daniela Kühn (born 1973), German-English combinatorialist, expert on infinite graphs, winner of the Whitehead Prize
- Radhika Kulkarni, Indian-American operations researcher, president of INFORMS
- Angela Kunoth (born 1963), German numerical analyst
- Frances Kuo, Taiwanese-Australian applied mathematician, expert on quasi-Monte Carlo methods
- Krystyna Kuperberg (born 1944), Polish-American topologist who found a smooth counterexample to the Seifert conjecture
- Věra Kůrková (born 1948), Czech expert in neural networks and approximation theory
- Rachel Kuske (born 1965), American-Canadian expert on stochastic and nonlinear dynamics, asymptotic methods, and industrial mathematics
- Klavdija Kutnar (born 1980), Slovenian algebraic graph theorist and academic administrator
- Gitta Kutyniok (born 1972), German researcher in harmonic analysis, compressed sensing, and image processing

== L ==
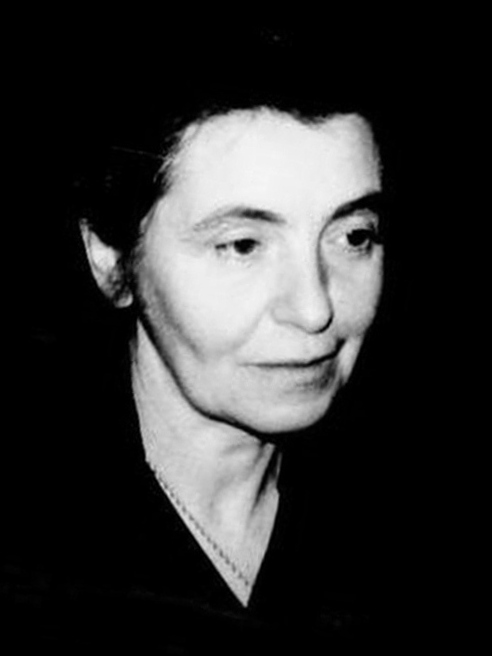
Olga Ladyzhenskaya proved the existence of long-time solutions of the Navier–Stokes equations in 2+1 dimensions.

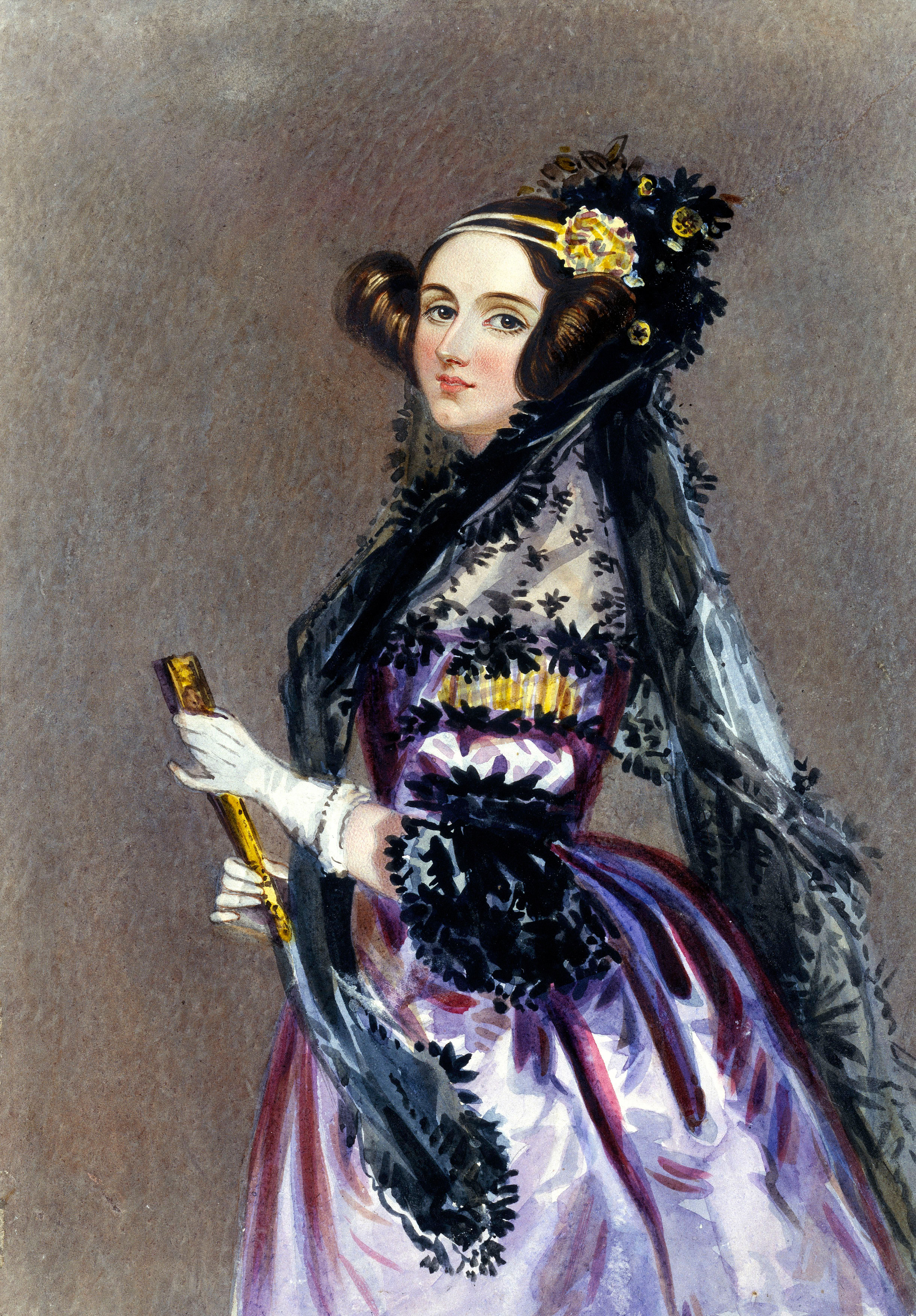
Ada, Countess of Lovelace wrote the first computer program, an algorithm for computing Bernoulli numbers on the Analytical Engine.

- Izabella Łaba (born 1966), Polish-Canadian specialist in harmonic analysis, geometric measure theory, and additive combinatorics
- Carole Lacampagne, American mathematician known for her work in mathematics education and gender equality
- Christine Ladd-Franklin (1847–1930), American psychologist, logician, and mathematician
- Jeanne LaDuke (born 1938), American child actress, mathematical analyst, and historian of mathematics
- Olga Ladyzhenskaya (1922–2004), Soviet mathematician, proved convergence of a finite difference method for Navier–Stokes
- Yvonne Lai, American scholar of mathematics education
- V. Lakshmibai, Indian-American expert on flag varieties and Schubert varieties
- Matilde Lalín, Argentine-Canadian number theorist, expert on L-functions and Mahler measure
- Lam Lay Yong (born 1936), Singaporean historian of mathematics, claimed Chinese origin for Hindu-Arabic numerals
- Ailsa Land, British operations researcher known for developing branch and bound algorithms
- Susan Landau (born 1954), American mathematician and computer scientist, known for internet security and denesting radicals
- Mary Landers (1905–1991), American mathematician, activist for academic collective bargaining
- Kerry Landman, Australian applied mathematician
- Alicia Prieto Langarica, American applied mathematician
- Tanja Lange, German number theorist and cryptographer
- Amy Langville (born 1975), American college basketball star and expert on ranking systems
- Loredana Lanzani (born 1965), Italian-American harmonic analyst
- Glenda Lappan (born 1939), developed Connected Mathematics curriculum, led National Council of Teachers of Mathematics
- Ruth Lara (1936–2000), Portuguese-Angolan educator, mathematician, translator, and activist, briefly first lady of Angola
- Gillie Larew (1882–1977), American mathematician, first alumna of Randolph–Macon Woman's College to become full professor there
- Jean Ann Larson, American set theorist and historian of mathematical logic
- Elisabeth Larsson (born 1971), Swedish researcher in scientific computing
- Joan Lasenby, British applied mathematician, expert on geometric algebra
- Irena Lasiecka (born 1948), Polish-American expert in control theory of partial differential equations
- Renu C. Laskar (born 1932), Indian-American graph theorist, specialist in domination numbers and circular arc graphs
- Klavdiya Latysheva (1897–1956), Soviet mathematician, contributed to differential equations, electrodynamics and probability
- Monique Laurent (born 1960), French-Dutch expert in mathematical optimization
- Kristin Lauter (born 1969), American researcher in elliptic curve cryptography, president of AWM
- Anna Lawniczak (born 1953), Polish-Canadian applied mathematician and cellular automatist
- Emille D. Lawrence, American topological graph theorist
- Ruth Lawrence (born 1971), child prodigy, British-Israeli researcher in knot theory and algebraic topology
- Snezana Lawrence, Yugoslav and British historian of mathematics
- Anneli Cahn Lax (1922–1999), American mathematician, winner of the George Pólya Award
- Anita Layton, Hong Kong-American applied mathematician who studies mathematical models of kidney function
- Katherine Puckett Layton, American mathematics educator and textbook author
- Lê Thị Thanh Nhàn (born 1970), Vietnamese mathematician, vice rector for Science at Thái Nguyên University, won Kovalevskaya Prize
- Alice Lee (1858–1939), helped discredit craniology
- Heisook Lee (born 1948), South Korean algebraist and algebraic coding theorist
- Hollylynne Lee, American mathematics and statistics educator
- Lee Hyang-sook (born 1963), South Korean mathematician, president of Ewha Womans University
- Joceline Lega, French applied mathematician interested in nonlinear dynamics
- Anne M. Leggett, American mathematical logician, editor of AWM Newsletter
- Emma Lehmer (1906–2007), Russian-American mathematician known for work on reciprocity laws in algebraic number theory
- Marguerite Lehr (1898–1987), pioneer in the use of television to teach mathematics
- Tanya Leise, American biomathematician, expert in circadian rhythms
- Joan Leitzel (1936–2026), American mathematics educator and university administrator
- Miriam Leiva, Cuban-American mathematics educator
- Anne Lemaître (born 1957), Belgian applied mathematician, expert on orbital resonance and space debris
- Mary Leng, British philosopher of mathematics
- Frédérique Lenger (1921–2005), Belgian mathematics educator and leader of the New Math movement
- Suzanne Lenhart (born 1954), American researcher in partial differential equations, president of AWM
- Ulrike Leopold-Wildburger (born 1949), Austrian mathematical economist, applied mathematician, and operations researcher
- Katrin Leschke (born 1968), German differential geometer, quaternionic analyst, and minimal surface theorist
- Nandi Olive Leslie, American industrial mathematician
- Gail Letzter (1960–2024), American quantum group representation theorist and intelligence agency executive
- Annie Leuch-Reineck (1880–1978), Swiss mathematician and women's rights activist
- Debbie Leung, Canadian expert in quantum communications
- Rachel Levy (born 1968), American applied mathematician, mathematics educator, and blogger
- Sophia Levy (1888–1963), American astronomer, numerical analyst, and mathematics educator
- Marta Lewicka (born 1972), Polish expert in nonlinear elasticity
- Florence Lewis (1877–1964), American mathematician and astronomer
- Marie Lhuissier (born 1989), French mathematical storyteller and children's book author
- Fengyan Li, Chinese and American applied mathematician specializing in computational magnetohydrodynamics
- Jing-Rebecca Li, applied mathematician in France, studies magnetic resonance imaging and Lyapunov equations
- Na Li, Chinese-American electrical engineer, applied mathematician, and control theorist
- Sherry Li, Chinese-American developer of sparse parallel solvers for systems of linear equations
- Winnie Li (born 1948), Chinese-American researcher in number theory, coding theory, automorphic forms, and spectral graph theory
- Paulette Libermann (1919–2007), French specialist in differential geometry
- Pamela Liebeck (1930–2012), British mathematician and mathematics educator
- Lillian Rosanoff Lieber (1886–1986), American mathematics professor and author of popular books on science and mathematics
- Magnhild Lien, Norwegian mathematician specializing in knot theory
- Ewa Ligocka (1947–1922), Polish mathematical analyst and political activist
- Vlada Limic, Croatian-French probability theorist
- Nelly Litvak (born 1972), Russian and Dutch complex network theorist
- Elizaveta Litvinova (1845–c. 1919), Russian mathematician and biographer, defied czar's order forbidding women to study abroad
- Bonnie Litwiller (1937–2012), American mathematics educator and textbook author
- Marie Litzinger (1899–1952), American number theorist
- Chiu-Chu Melissa Liu (born 1974), Taiwanese-American researcher in algebraic geometry and symplectic geometry
- Naomi Livesay (1916–2001), human computer and mechanical calculator programmer for the Manhattan Project
- Klara Löbenstein (1883–1968), German researcher in algebraic geometry
- Birgit Loch, German-Australian mathematician and academic administrator, expert on educational technology for mathematics
- Patti Frazer Lock (born 1953), American mathematics and statistics educator and textbook author
- Deborah Frank Lockhart, administrator at the National Science Foundation
- Elise Lockwood, American scholar of mathematics education focused on combinatorial and algorithmic thinking
- Susan Loepp (born 1967), American algebraist and cryptographer
- Marina Logares (born 1976), Spanish geometer and LGBT+ activist
- Mayme Logsdon (1881–1967), American algebraic geometer and mathematics educator
- Louise Zung-nyi Loh (1900–1981), Chinese mathematician, physicist, and educator
- Sara Lombardo, Italian mathematician, expert on rogue waves and integrable systems
- Luna Lomonaco, Italian dynamical systems theorist
- Ling Long (mathematician), Chinese-American expert on modular forms, elliptic surfaces, and dessins d'enfants
- Lynette Long, American psychologist, mathematics educator, and textbook author
- Carlotta Longo (1895- after 1959), Italian mathematical physicist and high school teacher
- Maria Longobardi, Italian mathematical statistician, expert in entropy and extropy
- Judith Q. Longyear (1938–1995), American researcher in graph theory and combinatorics
- Maria Laura Moura Mouzinho Leite Lopes (1917–2013), first Brazilian woman to earn a doctorate in mathematics
- Paola Loreti, Italian researcher in Fourier analysis, control theory, and non-integer bases
- Lisa Lorentzen, Norwegian mathematician and author, specializing in continued fractions
- Dawn Lott, African-American expert on numerical partial differential equations
- Ada Lovelace (1815–1852), wrote the first computer program as part of her work on Babbage's Analytical Engine
- Marissa Loving, American geometric group theorist
- Edith Rita Lowenstern (1904–1970), Australian mathematician
- María Teresa Lozano Imízcoz (born 1946), Spanish low-dimensional topologist
- Sylvia Chin-Pi Lu (1928–2014), Chinese-American commutative algebraist
- Katarzyna Lubnauer (born 1969), Polish probability theorist and politician
- Edith Hirsch Luchins (1921–2002), Polish-American mathematician, experimented on psychology of mathematical problem solving
- Maria Silvia Lucido (1963–2008), Italian mathematician, expert on the prime graphs of finite groups
- Malwina Łuczak, Polish-Australian probability theorist
- Monika Ludwig (born 1966), Austrian researcher in convex geometry, member of Austrian Academy of Sciences
- Alessandra Lunardi (born 1958), Italian mathematical analyst
- Xiaoyu Luo, Chinese and British applied mathematician, applies fluid dynamics and biomechanics to soft tissues
- Élisabeth Lutz (1914–2008), French student of Weil, showed how to compute torsion subgroups of elliptic curves
- Julie Lutz (born 1944), American astronomer and mathematician who studies planetary nebulae and symbiotic binary stars
- Sonja Lyttkens (1919–2014), Swedish mathematician, first Swedish woman to obtain a permanent academic position in mathematics

== M ==
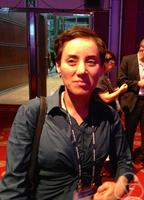
Maryam Mirzakhani in Seoul, where she received her Fields Medal in 2014

- Odile Macchi (born 1943), French mathematician and physicist
- Marta Macho Stadler (born 1962), Basque expert on foliations and mathematical blogger
- Barbara MacCluer, American expert on operator theory and author on functional analysis
- Brenda MacGibbon, Canadian mathematician, statistician, and decision scientist
- Sheila Scott Macintyre (1910–1960), Scottish researcher on the Whittaker constant, co-author of German–English mathematics dictionary
- Iris Mack (1956–2022), American financial mathematician and edutainment author
- Annie MacKinnon (1868–1940), Canadian-born American mathematician, third woman to earn a mathematics doctorate at an American university
- Diane Maclagan (born 1974), expert on toric varieties, Hilbert schemes, and tropical geometry
- Chrystal Macmillan (1872–1937), Scottish Liberal politician, barrister, feminist and pacifist, first female honours graduate in mathematics from University of Edinburgh
- Jessie MacWilliams (1917–1990), English researcher on error-correcting codes
- Kathleen Madden, American expert on dynamical systems
- Isabel Maddison (1869–1950), British mathematician known for her work on differential equations
- Penelope Maddy (born 1950), American philosopher of mathematics
- Urmila Mahadev, American quantum computing researcher
- Dorothy Maharam (1917–2014), American mathematician who made important contributions to measure theory
- Carolyn A. Maher, American expert in mathematics education
- Carolyn Mahoney (born 1946), African-American combinatorialist, president of Lincoln University of Missouri
- Apala Majumdar, British expert on liquid crystals
- Larisa Maksimova (born 1943), Russian mathematical logician
- Agnieszka Malinowska, Polish expert on fractional calculus and the calculus of variations
- Maryanthe Malliaris, American mathematician specializing in model theory
- Marie-Paule Malliavin (1935–2019), French algebraist
- Vivienne Malone-Mayes (1932–1995), fifth African-American woman to earn a PhD in mathematics, researcher in functional analysis
- Eugenia Malinnikova (born 1974), Russian-Norwegian expert in functional analysis and partial differential equations
- Claudia Malvenuto (born 1965), Italian mathematician known for her work on the Hopf algebra of permutations
- Michelle Manes, American mathematician interested in number theory, algebraic geometry, and dynamical systems
- Marie Cecilia Mangold (1872–1934), American mathematician, professor and nun
- Kathryn Mann, geometric topologist and geometric group theorist
- Cristina Manolache, British algebraic geometer
- Renata Mansini (born 1968), Italian applied mathematician, uses mathematical optimization for portfolio balancing
- Elizabeth Mansfield, Australian expert on moving frames and conservation laws
- Lisa Mantini, American mathematician
- Elena Mantovan, Italian-American arithmetic geometer
- María Manzano (born 1950), Spanish mathematical logician
- Elena Marchisotto (born 1945), American mathematician, mathematics educator, and historian of mathematics
- Anna Marciniak-Czochra (born 1974), Polish applied mathematician and mathematical biologist
- Matilde Marcolli (born 1969), Italian mathematical physicist
- Fotini Markopoulou-Kalamara (born 1971), Greek theoretical physicist interested in foundational mathematics and quantum mechanics
- Hannah Markwig (born 1980), German researcher in tropical geometry
- Alison Marr (born 1980), American graph theorist and advocate of inquiry-based learning
- Karen Marrongelle, American mathematics educator and academic administrator
- Bethany Rose Marsh, British expert in cluster algebras and tilting theory
- Susan H. Marshall, American number theorist
- Maia Martcheva, Bulgarian-American mathematical biologist
- Laura Martignon (born 1952), Colombian-Italian researcher in neuroscience and decision-making
- Emilie Martin (1869–1936), American group theorist
- Mireille Martin-Deschamps, French algebraic geometer, president of Société mathématique de France
- Consuelo Martínez (born 1955), Spanish algebraist
- María del Carmen Martínez Sancho (1901–1995), first woman in Spain to gain a PhD in Mathematics
- Salomé Martínez, Chilean mathematical biologist and mathematics educator
- Verónica Martínez de la Vega (born 1971), Mexican hypertopologist
- Katalin Marton (1941–2019), Hungarian information and probability theorist
- Susan Martonosi, American mathematician, applies operations research to counter-terrorism, epidemiology, and sports analytics
- Roswitha März (born 1940), German expert on differential-algebraic equations
- Verdiana Masanja (born 1954), first Tanzanian woman to earn a doctorate in mathematics
- Joanna Masingila (born 1960), American mathematics educator
- Vera Nikolaevna Maslennikova (1926–2000), Russian researcher on partial differential equations, hydrodynamics of rotating fluids, and function spaces
- Maura Mast, Irish-American differential geometer, mathematics educator, textbook author, and academic administrator
- Claire Mathieu (born 1965), French algorithms researcher
- Gordana Matic, Croatian-American low-dimensional topologist, expert on contact topology
- Kaisa Matomäki (born 1985), Finnish number theorist known for her work on multiplicative functions over short intervals
- Gretchen Matthews (born 1973), American algebraic coding theorist
- Lilian Matthiesen, applies Fourier analysis to Diophantine geometry
- Laura Matusevich, Argentine commutative algebraist
- Galina Matvievskaya (1930–2025), Soviet historian of mathematics
- Margaret Evelyn Mauch (1897–1987), early American mathematician and university professor
- Margaret Maxfield (1926–2016), American mathematician and mathematics book author
- Lola J. May (1923–2007), American mathematics educator and early proponent of new math
- Svitlana Mayboroda (born 1981), Ukrainian-American expert on boundary value problems for elliptic partial differential equations
- Ellen Maycock (born 1950), American functional analyst and mathematics educator
- Joanna Isabel Mayer (1904–1991), American mathematician and educator
- Francesca Mazzia (born 1967), Italian numerical analyst
- Anna Mazzucato, American expert on fluid dynamics
- Shirley McBay (1935–2021), first African-American doctorate at the University of Georgia
- Mary McCammon (c. 1928 – 2008), first woman to complete a doctoral degree in mathematics at Imperial College London
- Maeve McCarthy, Irish mathematician interested in inverse problems and biological modeling
- Lynne McClure, British mathematics educator
- Allison McCoy, American bioinformatician specializing in applied clinical informatics
- Dorothy McCoy (1903–2001), American mathematician, first female doctorate in mathematics at University of Iowa
- Janet McDonald (1905–2006), American geometer
- Dusa McDuff FRS (born 1945), English researcher on symplectic geometry, winner of Satter Prize, first female Hardy Lecturer
- Amy Roth McDuffie, American scholar of mathematics education
- Elizabeth McHarg (1923–1999), Scottish mathematician and translator, first female president of Edinburgh Mathematical Society
- Lois Curfman McInnes, American researcher on numerical solution of nonlinear partial differential equations for scientific applications
- Camille McKayle (born 1964), Afro-Jamaican-American mathematician and academic administrator
- Danica McKellar (born 1975), American actor, author, mathematician, and education advocate
- Joyce McLaughlin (1939–2017), American researcher in inverse problems
- Jeanette McLeod, New Zealand combinatorialist, popularizes mathematics through crochet and origami
- Jennifer McLoud-Mann, Cherokee mathematician who discovered the 15th and last class of convex pentagons that tile the plane
- Nicole McNeil, American developmental psychologist specializing in the cognitive development of mathematics
- Jenny McNulty, American matroid theorist and academic administrator
- Sallie Pero Mead (1893–1981), American human computer and radar engineer
- Catherine Meadows, American cryptographer who formally verifies cryptographic protocols
- Florence Marie Mears (1896–1995), American specialist in summation methods
- Elizabeth Meckes (1980–2020), American probability theorist
- Nicole Megow, German discrete mathematician and theoretical computer scientist, researcher in scheduling algorithms
- Josephine Janina Mehlberg (1905–1969), Polish Jewish anti-Nazi resistance worker and American mathematics professor
- Ulrike Meier Yang, German-American expert on numerical algorithms for scientific computing
- Beatrice Meini (born 1968), Italian computational mathematician and numerical analyst
- Tai Melcher, American mathematical analyst and probability theorist
- Sylvie Méléard, French probability theorist
- Pauline Mellon, Irish functional analyst, president of Irish Mathematical Society
- Karin Melnick, American differential geometer
- Teresa Melo (born 1966), Portuguese mathematician and operations researcher
- Florence Merlevède, French probability theorist
- Mona Merling, Romanian-American algebraic K-theorist
- Helen Abbot Merrill (1864–1949), American mathematician, educator and textbook author
- Winifred Edgerton Merrill (1862–1951), first woman with a degree from Columbia University and first American female doctorate in mathematics
- Adele Merritt, American applied mathematician and intelligence officer
- Uta Merzbach (1933–2017), German-American historian of mathematics, first Smithsonian curator of mathematical instruments
- Vilma Mesa, Colombian-American mathematics educator
- Chikako Mese, American differential geometer
- Jill P. Mesirov, American mathematician, computer scientist, and computational biologist, president of AWM
- Jaqueline Mesquita (born 1985), Brazilian mathematician specializing in differential equations
- Karola Mészáros, American algebraic and geometric combinatorialist
- Dora Metcalf (1892–1982), British mathematician and data analysis entrepreneur
- Ida Martha Metcalf (1857–1952), second American female doctorate in mathematics
- Catherine Meusburger (born 1978), German mathematical physicist interested in string theory
- Ariane Mézard, French arithmetic geometer
- Zoi-Heleni Michalopoulou, Greek and American applied mathematician, acoustical engineer, and oceanographer
- Karen Michalowicz (died 2006), American mathematics educator
- Marie-Louise Michelsohn (born 1941), American researcher on complex geometry, spin manifolds, the Dirac operator, and algebraic cycles
- Ruth I. Michler (1967–2000), American commutative algebraist and algebraic geometer
- Kaisa Miettinen (born 1965), Finnish industrial optimization researcher and academic administrator
- Ana Millán Gasca (born 1964), Spanish historian of science and scholar of mathematics education
- Alison Miller, first American female gold medalist in the International Mathematical Olympiad, three-time Elizabeth Lowell Putnam award winner
- Laura Miller, American mathematician, applies fluid dynamics to insect flight and jellyfish propulsion
- Maggie Miller, American low-dimensional topologist
- Mirka Miller (1949–2016), Czech-Australian graph theorist, data security expert
- Margaret Millington (1944–1973), English expert on modular forms
- Susan Milner, Canadian mathematics educator, popularizer of mathematics through puzzles and games
- Eva Miranda, Spanish expert on symplectic dynamics
- Marie Lynn Miranda, American data scientist and professor of applied computational mathematics and statistics
- Rosa M. Miró-Roig (born 1960), Spanish algebraic geometer and commutative algebraist
- Maryam Mirzakhani (1977–2017), first female Fields medalist; researcher on the symmetry of curved surfaces
- Yuliya Mishura, Ukrainian probability theorist and mathematical finance expert
- Josephine M. Mitchell (1912–2000), Canadian-American mathematical analyst, victim of discriminative application of anti-nepotism rules
- Dorina Mitrea (born 1965), Romanian-American functional analyst and mathematics educator
- Irina Mitrea, Romanian-American researcher in partial differential equations known for outreach to women and minorities
- Yash Mittal (born 1941), first female program director for probability at US National Science Foundation
- Atsuko Miyaji (born 1965), Japanese cryptographer and number theorist
- Reiko Miyaoka (born 1951), Japanese geometer known for her research on hypersurfaces
- Emilija Mlakar Branc (1901–1989), mathematician and author of mathematics textbooks; first woman to graduate in mathematics from the University of Ljubljana
- Fatma Moalla (born 1939), first Tunisian woman to earn a French doctorate in mathematics
- Colette Moeglin (born 1953), French expert on automorphic forms
- Aliya Moldabekova (born 1976), Kazakh mathematician and bank official
- Joanne Moldenhauer (1928–2016), American high school mathematics teacher
- Laura Monk, French spectral geometer
- Amanda Montejano, Mexican graph theorist, expert in coloring geometric graphs
- Clemency Montelle (born 1977), New Zealand historian of Indian mathematics and astronomy
- Susan Montgomery (born 1943), American researcher in noncommutative algebra
- Helen Moore, American mathematician who applies control theory to combination therapy in the health industry
- Gisèle Mophou, Cameroonian numerical analyst in the French Antilles
- Cathleen Synge Morawetz (1923–2017), Canadian-American researcher on the partial differential equations governing fluid flow
- Anne C. Morel, American logician, order theorist, and algebraist, first female full professor of mathematics at the University of Washington
- Sophie Morel (born 1979), French number theorist and contributor to the Langlands program, first female tenured mathematics professor at Harvard
- Eugenie Maria Morenus (1881–1966), American mathematician and professor
- Susan Morey, American mathematician specializing in commutative algebra
- Carolyn Morgan, American statistician and applied mathematician
- Hélène Morlon (born 1978), French mathematical biologist, models biodiversity
- Irene Moroz, British applied mathematician
- Joy Morris (born 1970), Canadian researcher on groups and graphs
- Kirsten Morris (born 1960), Canadian control theorist
- Rosa M. Morris (1914–2011), Welsh applied mathematician and aerodynamicist
- Jennifer Morse, American algebraic combinatorialist
- Rose Morton (1925–1999), American expert in the mathematical modeling of bubbles
- Judit Moschkovich, American professor of mathematics education
- Joan Moschovakis, American intuitionistic logician
- Ruth Moufang (1905–1977), German researcher on non-associative algebraic structures, namesake of Moufang loops
- Magdalena Mouján (1926–2005), Argentine mathematician of Basque descent, operations researcher, computing pioneer, and science fiction author
- Édith Mourier (1920–2017), French probability theorist
- Nežka Mramor–Kosta, Slovenian mathematician
- Jennifer Mueller, American applied mathematician, expert in inverse problems and electrical impedance tomography
- Edith Alice Müller (1918–1995), Swiss mathematician and astronomer, studied the group theory of Moorish tile designs
- Anna Mullikin (1893–1975), American mathematician, early investigator of point set theory
- Irene Mulvey, American mathematician, president of American Association of University Professors
- Anca Muscholl (born 1967), Romanian-German mathematical logician and theoretical computer scientist
- Kieka Mynhardt (born 1953), South African and Canadian expert on dominating sets in graph theory
- Emmy Murphy, American symplectic geometer
- Cecilia Wangechi Mwathi (1963–2011), Kenyan mathematician and union activist, first woman in Kenya to become a mathematics professor
- Valerie Myerscough (1942–1980), British mathematician and astrophysicist
- Vera Myller (1880–1970), Russian mathematician and student of David Hilbert, first female professor in Romania
- Wendy Myrvold, Canadian graph theorist, combinatorist, and algorithms researcher

== N ==
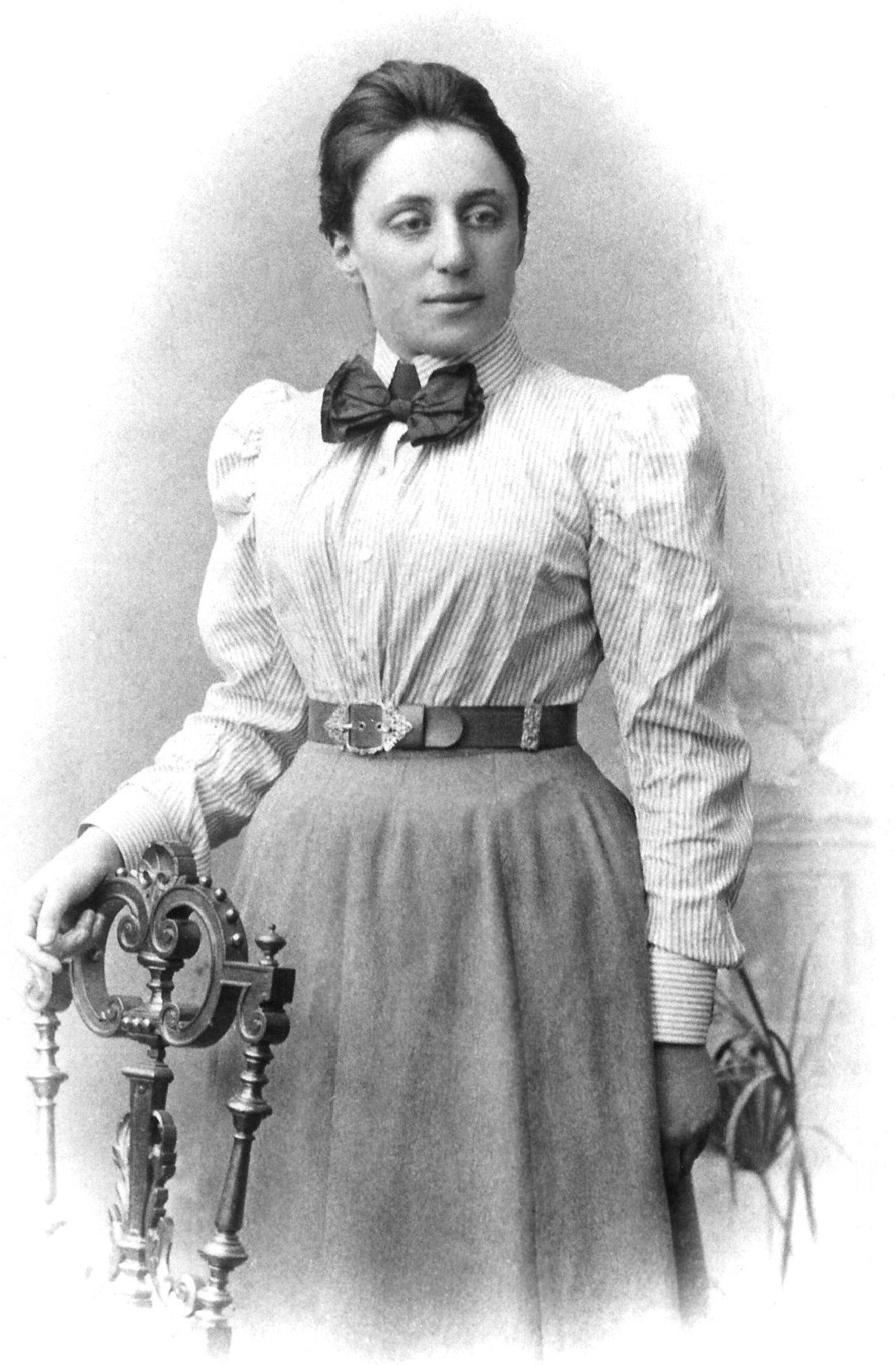
Emmy Noether has been called "the greatest woman mathematician of all time". In the early 1920s she developed the modern formulation of ring theory. She is also known for a result in the calculus of variations known as Noether's theorem, which relates symmetries to conservation laws.

- Anna Nagurney, Ukrainian-American mathematician, economist, educator and author in operations management
- Hasibun Naher, Pakistani applied mathematician who studies tsunamis
- Andrea R. Nahmod (born 1964), American expert in nonlinear Fourier analysis, harmonic analysis, and partial differential equations
- Pia Nalli (1884–1964), Italian researcher in functional analysis and tensor calculus
- Seema Nanda, Indian researcher in applications of mathematics to biology, engineering and finance
- Mangala Narlikar, Indian number theorist, author of Marathi-language mathematics books for schoolchildren
- Tamilla Nasirova (1936–2023), Azerbaijani probability theorist
- Sonia Natale (born 1972), Argentine expert in abstract algebra
- Caryn Navy (born 1953), blind American researcher in set-theoretic topology and Braille technology
- Lyudmyla Nazarova, Ukrainian representation theorist
- Vicky Neale, British number theorist and mathematics popularizer
- Gabriele Nebe (born 1967), German researcher on sphere packings, lattices, and codes
- Deanna Needell, American applied mathematician, won 2016 IMA Prize in Mathematics and Applications
- Sara Negri (born 1967), Italian-Finnish proof theorist
- Evelyn Nelson (1943–1987), Canadian researcher in universal algebra with applications to theoretical computer science
- Gail S. Nelson (born 1959), American mathematician, textbook author, and editor-in-chief of the MAA "Problem Books"
- Nancy Neudauer, American matroid theorist known for her work in mathematical outreach in Africa and South America
- Claudia Neuhauser (born 1962), German-American mathematical biologist whose research concerns spatial ecology
- Hanna Neumann (1914–1971), German-born mathematician who worked on group theory
- Adriana Neumann de Oliveira, Brazilian expert in interacting particle systems
- Robin Neumayer, American mathematician whose research connects the calculus of variations, partial differential equations, and geometric analysis
- Mara Neusel (1964–2014), German-American invariant theorist and advocate for women in mathematics
- Monica Nevins (born 1973), Canadian algebraist
- Virginia Newell (1917–2025), American mathematics educator, author, politician, and centenarian
- Mary Frances Winston Newson (1869–1959), first female American to receive a PhD in mathematics from a European university
- Sylvia de Neymet (1939–2013), First Mexican woman to earn a doctorate in mathematics in Mexico
- Purity Ngina, Kenyan biomathematician
- Giang Nguyen (born 1985), Vietnamese-Australian applied mathematician and chess master
- Aoibhinn Ní Shúilleabháin (born 1983), Irish celebrity and mathematics lecturer
- Nancy K. Nichols, British applied mathematician and numerical analyst
- Olympia Nicodemi, American mathematician and mathematics educator interested in wavelets and the history of mathematics
- Phyllis Nicolson (1917–1968), British developer of the Crank–Nicolson method for solving partial differential equations
- Barbara Niethammer (born 1963), German expert on the growth of particles in liquids
- Sofía Nieto (born 1984), Spanish mathematician and actress
- Nilima Nigam, Indian-Canadian applied mathematician and mathematical physiologist
- Stanisława Nikodym (1897–1988), first Polish woman to earn PhD in mathematics, known for research in continuum theory
- Mila Nikolova (1962–2018), Bulgarian researcher in image processing, inverse problems, and compressed sensing
- Kumiko Nishioka (born 1954), Japanese specialist on transcendental numbers and Mahler functions
- Wiesława Nizioł, Polish researcher in arithmetic algebraic geometry
- Emmy Noether (1882–1935), German researcher in abstract algebra and theoretical physics, named "the greatest woman mathematician of all time"
- Margarita Nolasco Santiago, Mathematics textbook author, member of Puerto Rico Senate
- Khalida Inayat Noor, Pakistani mathematical analyst
- Dorothée Normand-Cyrot, French control theorist
- M. Helena Noronha, Brazilian-American mathematics educator, mentor, and textbook author
- Maria Nosarzewska, Polish mathematician known for Nosarzewska's inequality in the geometry of numbers
- Anne van den Nouweland, Dutch-American cooperative game theorist
- Isabella Novik (born 1971), Israeli-American expert on algebraic and geometric combinatorics
- Frieda Nugel (1884–1966), one of the first German women to obtain a doctorate in mathematics
- Helena J. Nussenzveig Lopes, Brazilian mathematician known for her research on incompressible Euler equations
- Kaisa Nyberg (born 1948), Finnish cryptographer

== O ==
- Katharine Elizabeth O'Brien (1901–1986), American mathematician, musician and poet
- Vivian O'Brien (1924–2010), American applied mathematician and physicist, expert in fluid dynamics and visual perception
- Hilary Ockendon, British applied mathematician, expert in fluid dynamics
- Ortrud Oellermann, South African and Canadian graph theorist
- Yoshiko Ogata, Japanese quantum mathematical physicist
- Frédérique Oggier, Swiss and Singaporean coding theorist
- Hee Oh (born 1969), Korean-American dynamical systems theorist, expert on equidistribution in fractal structures
- Eve Oja (1948–2019), Estonian functional analyst
- Christine O'Keefe, Australian researcher in finite geometry and information security
- Kathleen Adebola Okikiolu (born 1965), British-American researcher on differential operators, developed curricula for inner-city children
- Dianne P. O'Leary (born 1951), American expert on scientific computing, computational linear algebra, and the history of scientific computing
- Janis Oldham (1956–2021), African-American differential geometer and mathematics educator
- Olga Oleinik (1925–2001), Soviet researcher on partial differential equations, elastic media, and boundary layers
- Dorte Olesen (born 1948), first Danish mathematician to be appointed full professor
- Gloria Olive (1923–2006), American-born New Zealand mathematician
- Déborah Oliveros, Mexican discrete and convex geometer
- Kathleen Ollerenshaw (1912–2014), British mathematician and politician, mayor of Manchester, educational advisor to Margaret Thatcher
- Yewande Olubummo (born 1960), Nigerian-American functional analyst
- Rebecca Walo Omana (born 1951), first female mathematics professor in the Democratic Republic of the Congo
- Cathy O'Neil, American arithmetic algebraic geometer and author on the social hazards of machine learning
- Eugenia O'Reilly-Regueiro, Mexican algebraic combinatorist
- Rosa Orellana, American mathematician specializing in algebraic combinatorics and representation theory
- Ewa Orłowska (born 1935), Polish logician
- Omayra Ortega, American mathematical epidemiologist
- Laura Ortíz-Bobadilla, Mexican expert on holomorphic foliations
- Hinke Osinga (born 1969), Dutch expert in dynamical systems, crocheted the Lorenz manifold
- Barbara L. Osofsky (born 1937), American algebraist, first woman in 50 years to address a national AMS meeting, first female AMS journal editor
- Mina Ossiander, American probability theorist
- Sofiya Ostrovska (born 1958), Ukrainian probability theorist and approximation theorist
- Victoria Otero, president of the Royal Spanish Mathematical Society
- Katharine Ott, American harmonic analyst
- Marie Françoise Ouedraogo (born 1967), Burkinabé expert on pseudodifferential operators and superalgebras, president of African Women in Mathematics Association
- Helen Brewster Owens (1881–1968), American suffragette, associate editor of the American Mathematical Monthly
- Robyn Owens, Australian applied mathematician, studies computer vision including face recognition and the imaging of lactation

== P ==
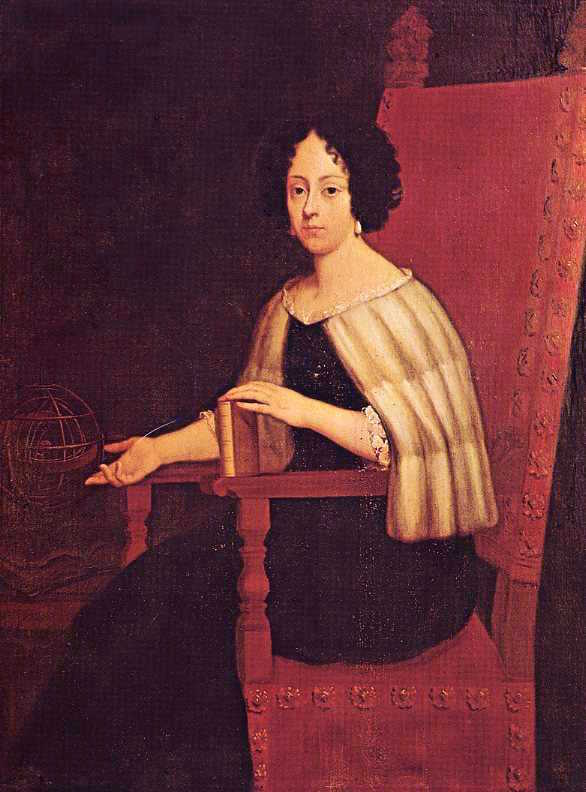
In 1678, Elena Cornaro Piscopia became the first woman to earn a doctoral degree.

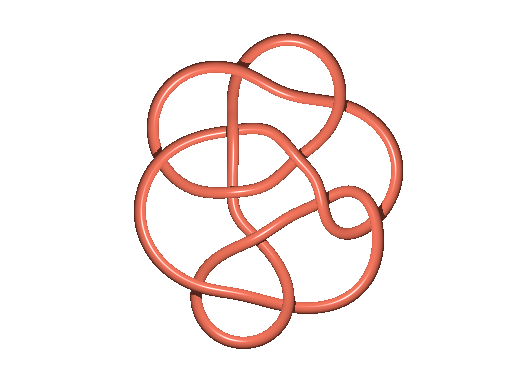
Lisa Piccirillo solved the Conway knot's slicing problem when she was a graduate student.

- Ietje Paalman-de Miranda (1936–2020), Surinamese–Dutch mathematician, first female mathematics professor at University of Amsterdam
- Harriet Padberg (1922–2014), mathematician, music therapist, and pioneer of algorithmic music composition
- Mariolina Padula (died 2012), Italian expert on fluid dynamics
- Christina Pagel, British German operations researcher, applies data analysis and mathematical modelling to health care
- Eleanor Pairman (1896–1973), Scottish mathematician, developed methods to teach mathematics to blind students
- Ilona Palásti (1924–1991), Hungarian researcher in discrete geometry, geometric probability, and random graphs
- Pandrosion (4th century AD), ancient Greek mathematician predating Hypatia, developed an approximation for cube roots
- Erika Pannwitz (1904–1975), German geometric topologist who proved that every knot has a quadrisecant
- Anna Panorska, Polish-American expert on extreme events in stochastic processes and on the effect of weather on baseball
- Greta Panova (born 1983), Bulgarian-American algebraic combinatorist
- Theoni Pappas (born 1944), American mathematics teacher and author of books on popular mathematics
- Raman Parimala (born 1948), Indian mathematician known for her contributions to algebra
- Clare Parnell (born 1970), British astrophysicist and applied mathematician, studies the mathematics of the sun and of magnetic fields
- Haesun Park, Korean-American researcher in numerical analysis and the data sciences
- Jinyoung Park, South Korean combinatorist
- Karen Parshall (born 1955), American historian of mathematics
- Griselda Pascual (1926–2001), Spanish algebraic number theorist and mathematics translator
- Bozenna Pasik-Duncan, Polish-American control theorist and mathematics educator
- Maria Pastori (1895–1975), Italian mathematician, specialist in rational mechanics
- Christine Paulin-Mohring (born 1962), French mathematical logician and computer scientist, developer of Coq theorem prover
- Barbara Paulson (1928–2023), American human computer at NASA's Jet Propulsion Laboratory
- Nataša Pavlović, Serbian–American expert in fluid dynamics and nonlinear dispersive equations
- Sylvie Paycha (born 1960), French mathematician working in operator theory
- Sandrine Péché (born 1977), French expert on random matrices
- Jean Pedersen (1934–2016), American mathematician and author, expert on mathematical paper folding
- M. Cristina Pedicchio, Italian category theorist and academic administrator
- Irena Peeva, American researcher in commutative algebra and its applications
- Jeanne Peiffer (born 1948), Luxembourgian historian of mathematics
- Leona May Peirce 1863–1954), American mathematician and educator
- Magda Peligrad, Romanian probability theorist known for her work on stochastic processes
- Beatrice Pelloni (born 1962), Italian expert on partial differential equations
- Rose Peltesohn (1913–1998), German-Israeli researcher in additive combinatorics
- Kirsi Peltonen, Finnish mathematician whose interests include differential geometry and the connections between mathematics and art
- Charlotte Elvira Pengra (1875–1916), sixth American woman to receive a doctorate in mathematics
- Cristina Pereyra (born 1964), Venezuelan mathematician, author of several books on wavelets and harmonic analysis
- Hazel Perfect (died 2015), British combinatorialist, author, and translator, inventor of gammoids
- Teri Perl (born 1926), American mathematics educator, educational software designer, and author
- Bernadette Perrin-Riou (born 1955), French number theorist, winner of the Ruth Lyttle Satter Prize
- Mary Perry Smith (1926–2015), American mathematics educator, founder of MESA program for under-privileged students
- Karoline Pershell, American mathematician and roboticist
- Laura Person, American low-dimensional topologist
- Ilaria Perugia (born 1969), Italian applied mathematician and numerical analyst
- Adriana Pesci, Argentine fluid dynamicist, expert on flagellar motion, soap films, and the Leidenfrost effect
- Małgorzata Peszyńska (born 1962), Polish-American applied mathematician, models geological flow in porous media
- Rózsa Péter (1905–1977), recursion theorist, first woman elected to the Hungarian Academy of Sciences
- Stefanie Petermichl (born 1971), German-French mathematical analyst, first female winner of the Salem Prize
- Louise Petrén-Overton (1880–1977), first Swedish woman with a doctorate in mathematics
- Guergana Petrova, Bulgarian applied mathematician, uses numerical methods to solve differential equations
- Sonja Petrović, American mathematical statistician
- Linda Petzold (born 1954), researcher in differential algebraic equations and simulation, member of National Academy of Engineering
- Julia Pevtsova, Russian-American representation theorist
- Mamokgethi Phakeng (born 1966), first black female South African to earn a PhD in mathematics education
- Flora Philip (1865–1943), first female member of the Edinburgh Mathematical Society
- Cynthia A. Phillips, American expert on combinatorial optimization
- Dominique Picard (born 1953), French expert on the statistical applications of wavelets
- Sophie Piccard (1904–1990), Russian-Swiss mathematician, first female full professor in Switzerland
- Lisa Piccirillo, American low-dimensional topologist
- Ragni Piene (born 1947), Norwegian algebraic geometer, member of the Norwegian Academy of Science and Letters
- Lillian Pierce, American mathematician whose research connects number theory with harmonic analysis
- Johanna Piesch (1898–1992), Austrian pioneer in switching algebra
- Marie Anne Victoire Pigeon (1724–1767), French mathematician, writer, and teacher
- Faustina Pignatelli (d. 1785), princess of Colubrano, second woman elected to the Academy of Sciences of Bologna
- Gabriella Pinzari, Italian expert on the n-body problem
- Jill Pipher (born 1955), researcher in harmonic analysis, Fourier analysis, differential equations, and cryptography, president of AWM
- Laura Pisati (died 1908), Italian mathematician, first woman invited to speak at International Congress of Mathematicians
- Elena Cornaro Piscopia (1646–1684), Italian philosopher, musician, and mathematics lecturer, first woman to earn a doctorate
- Toniann Pitassi, American-Canadian computational complexity theorist, expert on proof complexity
- Shirley Pledger, New Zealand mathematician and statistician known for her work on mark and recapture methods
- Vera Pless (1931–2020), American mathematician specializing in combinatorics and coding theory
- Kim Plofker (born 1964), American historian of Indian mathematics, winner of the Brouwer Medal
- Gerlind Plonka, German mathematician known for her work on refinable functions and curvelets
- Eileen Poiani, American mathematician, first woman to teach mathematics at Saint Peter's University, first female president of Pi Mu Epsilon
- Claudia Polini, Italian expert on commutative algebra
- Harriet Pollatsek (born 1942), Lie theorist who has applied difference sets to error correcting codes and coding theory
- Pelageya Polubarinova-Kochina (1899–1999), Soviet researcher in fluid mechanics, hydrodynamics, and history of mathematics
- Clarice Poon, British applied mathematician, expert in optimization for image processing and machine learning
- Elena Moldovan Popoviciu (1924–2009), Romanian functional analyst
- Freda Porter (born 1957), American applied mathematician, groundwater consultant, and Native American leader
- Claire Postlethwaite, New Zealand dynamical systems theorist
- Yvonne Pothier (born 1937), Canadian mathematics educator, Catholic nun, and activist for refugees
- Marian Pour-El (1928–2009), American mathematical logician and computable analyst
- Sarah Powell, American scholar of special education in mathematics
- Victoria Powers (1958–2025), American real algebraic geometer and social choice theorist
- Maria Assunta Pozio (died 2018), Italian expert on partial differential equations
- Claire Prada (born 1962), French applied mathematician, expert on time-reversed acoustics
- Cheryl Praeger (born 1948), Australian researcher in group theory, algebraic graph theory and combinatorial designs
- Malabika Pramanik, Indian-Canadian harmonic analyst
- Norma Presmeg (1942–2026), South African and American mathematics education researcher
- Eleanor C. Pressly (1918–2003), American mathematician and sounding rocket engineer
- Emma Previato (1952–2022), researcher in algebraic geometry and partial differential equations
- Candice Renee Price, American mathematician, advocate for greater representation of women and people of color in STEM
- Rachel Justine Pries, American arithmetic geometer and Galois theorist
- Hilary Priestley, British mathematician who used topological methods to study distributive lattices
- Elena Prieto-Rodriguez, Spanish and Australian mathematician, theoretical computer scientist, and mathematics educator
- Michela Procesi (born 1973), Italian expert in Hamiltonian partial differential equations
- Dorette Pronk (born 1968), Dutch and Canadian category theorist and mathematics contest leader
- Christine Proust (born 1953), French expert on Babylonian mathematics
- Mileva Prvanović (1929–2016), Serbian differential geometer, first to earn a doctorate in geometry in Serbia
- Danuta Przeworska-Rolewicz (1931–2012), Polish mathematician and resistance fighter in World War II
- Mary Pugh, American-Canadian expert on thin films
- Amber L. Puha, American probability theorist
- Jessica Purcell, American and Australian low-dimensional topologist
- Florence Purington (1862–1950), first dean of Mount Holyoke College
- Ulla Pursiheimo (born 1944), Finnish control theorist who became the first female mathematics professor in Finland
- Helena Pycior (born 1947), American historian of mathematics and expert on Marie Curie and human-animal relations

== Q ==
- Martine Queffélec (born 1949), French expert in substitution dynamical systems and Diophantine approximation
- Jennifer Quinn, American combinatorialist
- Peregrina Quintela Estévez (born 1960), Spanish applied mathematician

== R ==
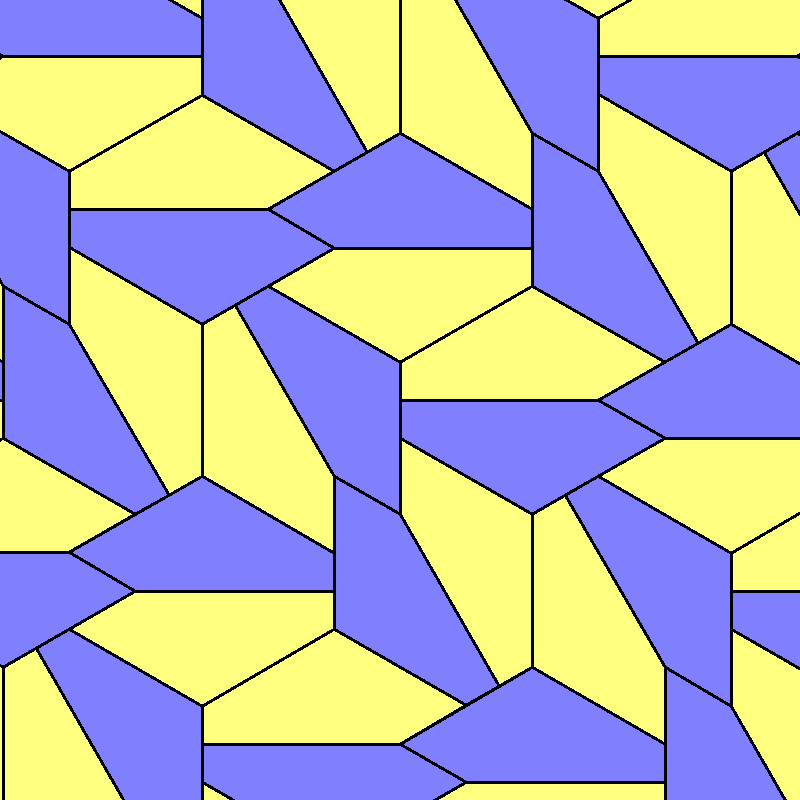
Lacking any formal training, Marjorie Rice conducted a systematic study of pentagon tiling, discovering four of the fifteen known types of tiling convex pentagons.

- Ami Radunskaya, American mathematician, specializes in dynamical systems and applications to medical problems, president of AWM
- Virginia Ragsdale (1870–1945), American specialist in algebraic curves, formulated the Ragsdale conjecture
- Lina Fazylovna Rakhmatullina (1932–2025), Russian expert on functional differential equations
- Alison Ramage, British expert in preconditioning methods for numerical linear algebra
- Kavita Ramanan, Indian-American probability theorist
- Mythily Ramaswamy (born 1954), Indian functional analyst and control theorist
- Susan Miller Rambo (1883–1977), second woman awarded a PhD from the University of Michigan, delegate to 1928 ICM
- Danielle Carr Ramdath (born 1966), American applied mathematician, epidemiologist, and academic administrator
- Sujatha Ramdorai (born 1962), Indian-Canadian algebraic number theorist, expert on Iwasawa theory
- Saly Ruth Ramler (1894–1993), first woman to earn a mathematics doctorate from Charles University
- Jacqui Ramagge, Australian mathematician and academic administrator, president of Australian Mathematical Society
- Asha Rao, Indian-Australian mathematician and expert in cybersecurity
- Annie Raoult (born 1951), French applied mathematician, models cell membranes and other thin nanostructures
- Helena Rasiowa (1917–1994), Polish researcher in the foundations of mathematics and algebraic logic
- Marina Ratner (1938–2017), Russian-American ergodic theorist, member of National Academy of Sciences
- Cora Ratto de Sadosky (1912–1981), Argentine mathematician and human rights activist
- Geneviève Raugel (1951–2019), French numerical analyst and dynamical systems theorist
- Ethel Raybould (1899–1987), Australian mathematician and mathematics benefactor
- Adrienne Sophie Rayl (1898–1989), American mathematician and professor
- Michèle Raynaud (born 1938), French algebraic geometer
- Margaret Rayner (1929–2019), British expert on isoperimetric inequalities, president of Mathematical Association
- Michela Redivo-Zaglia, Italian numerical analyst
- Mary Lynn Reed (born 1967), American mathematician, intelligence researcher, and short fiction writer
- Mary Rees (born 1953), British specialist in complex dynamical systems
- Mina Rees (1902–1997), first female president of the American Association for the Advancement of Science
- Sarah Rees (born 1957), British group theorist
- Karin Reich (born 1941), German historian of mathematics and biographer of mathematicians
- M. Henrietta Reilly (1895–1964), American nun and mathematician
- Anna Barbara Reinhart (1730–1796), Swiss mathematician, wrote commentary on Newton's Principia
- Kristina Reiss (born 1952), German mathematics educator
- Idun Reiten (1942–2025), Norwegian representation theorist, member of the Norwegian Academy of Science and Letters
- Kasia Rejzner (born 1985), Polish mathematical physicist
- Yuriko Renardy, Australian-American expert in fluid dynamics
- Rosemary Renaut, British and American computational mathematician
- Ingrid Rewitzky, South African mathematical logician
- Barbara Reys (born 1953), American mathematics educator known for her research in number sense and mental calculation
- Karen Rhea, American calculus educator and proponent of flipped classrooms
- Ida Rhodes (1900–1986), American pioneer in computer programming, designed the first computer used for Social Security
- Pilar Ribeiro (1911–2011), Portuguese mathematician, founded Portuguese Mathematical Society and Gazeta de Matemática
- Marjorie Rice (1923–2017), American amateur mathematician who discovered new pentagon tilings
- Joan L. Richards (born 1948), American historian of mathematics
- Sophia Foster Richardson (1855–1916), American geometer and textbook author
- Bettina Richmond (1958–2009), German-American algebraist, textbook author, and murder victim
- Mary Rickett (1861–1925), British mathematician and educator
- Cicely Ridley (1927–2008), British-American applied mathematician, developed codes for quantum chemistry and climate models
- Christine Riedtmann (born 1952), Swiss algebraist, president of Swiss Mathematical Society
- Eleanor Rieffel (born 1965), American applied mathematician interested in quantum computing, computer vision, and cryptography
- Carol Jane Anger Rieke (1908–1999), American astronomer and mathematics educator
- Konstanze Rietsch, algebraic geometer
- Edwina Rissland, American researcher on knowledge representation in mathematics and case-based reasoning in computational law
- Beatrice Rivière (born 1974), French expert on numerical simulation of fluid flow through porous media
- Catherine A. Roberts (born 1965), American applied mathematician and executive director of the American Mathematical Society
- Rachel Roberts, American low-dimensional topologist
- Siobhan Roberts, Canadian mathematical biographer
- Vanessa Robins, Australian computational topologist
- Julia Robinson (1919–1985), American researcher on diophantine equations, contributed to solution of Hilbert's Tenth Problem
- Margaret M. Robinson, American number theorist and expert on zeta functions
- Alvany Rocha, American specialist in Lie groups, computed characters of the Virasoro algebra
- Eliane R. Rodrigues, Brazilian-Mexican researcher on stochastic models for pollution and health
- Jana Rodriguez Hertz (born 1970), Argentine and Uruguayan mathematician
- Rosana Rodríguez-López, Spanish expert on the application of fixed-point theorems to differential equations
- Rubí Rodríguez, Chilean complex geometer, president of Chilean Mathematical Society
- Josephine Robinson Roe (1858–1946), American mathematician and university professor
- Sylvie Roelly (born 1960), French probability theorist
- Alice Rogers, English expert on supermanifolds
- Marie Rognes (born 1982), Norwegian researcher in scientific computing and numerical methods
- Judith Roitman (born 1945), American specialist in set theory, topology, Boolean algebra, and mathematics education
- Barbara Rokowska (1926–2012), Polish combinatorist
- Anna Romanowska, Polish abstract algebraist, first convenor of European Women in Mathematics
- Dolores Romero Morales (born 1971), Spanish operations researcher
- Colva Roney-Dougal, British computational group theorist
- Anna Rönström (1847–1920), Swedish educator, school founder, and mathematician
- Marian P. Roque, Filipina expert on partial differential equations, president of the Mathematical Society of the Philippines
- Tatiana Roque, Brazilian historian of mathematics and politician
- Ana Ros Camacho, Spanish mathematical physicist whose work connects superconductivity with quantum field theory
- Frances A. Rosamond (born 1943), Australian researcher in parameterized complexity, advocate for women in computer science and mathematics
- Lauren Lynn Rose, American mathematician active in mathematical outreach, co-creator of the card game EvenQuads
- Margit Rösler, German expert on harmonic analysis, special functions, and Dunkl operators
- Mary G. Ross (1908–2008), first Native American female engineer, studied mathematics for aeronautics and celestial mechanics
- Alida Rossander (1843–1909) and Jenny Rossander (1837–1887), Swedish mathematics teachers and women's rights activists
- Corinna Rossi (born 1968), Italian Egyptologist and historian of Egyptian mathematics and architecture
- Alice Roth (1905–1977), Swiss mathematician known for her invention of Swiss cheese spaces
- Hildegard Rothe-Ille (1899–1942), German mathematician specializing in Ramsey theory
- Linda Preiss Rothschild (born 1945), president of AWM, vice-president of AMS, co-editor-in-chief of Mathematical Research Letters
- Emma Unson Rotor (1913–1998), Filipino-American physicist and mathematician, helped develop the proximity fuse
- Christel Rotthaus, German-American researcher in commutative algebra
- Svetlana Roudenko, Russian-American functional analyst
- Christiane Rousseau (born 1954), French-Canadian mathematician, president of the Canadian Mathematical Society
- Julie Rowlett (born 1978), American geometric analyst
- Marie-Françoise Roy (born 1950), French expert in real algebraic geometry, co-founder of two organizations for women in mathematics
- Julia Rozanska, Soviet topologist
- Maria Aparecida Soares Ruas (born 1948), Brazilian singularity theorist
- Jean E. Rubin (1926–2002), American expert on the axiom of choice
- Mary Ellen Rudin (1924–2013), constructed many counterexamples in topology
- Adela Ruiz de Royo (1943–2019), first lady of Panama
- Mari-Jo P. Ruiz, Filipina graph theorist and operations researcher
- Iris Runge (1888–1966), German applied mathematician, translator and biographer
- Mary Beth Ruskai (1944–2023), proved subadditivity of quantum entropy, bounded the electrons in an atom, advocate for women in mathematics
- Beulah Russell (1878–1940), American mathematician
- Alma Johanna Ruubel (1899–1990, Estonian mathematician, developed curvilinear representational geometry
- Barbara Falkenbach Ryan, American mathematician, computer scientist, statistician and business executive
- Halina Ryffert (1916–1996), Polish cryptographer, mathematician, and professor of acoustics

== S ==
- Irene Sabadini, Italian hypercomplex analyst
- Flora Sadler (1912–2000), Scottish mathematician and astronomer
- Cora Sadosky (1940–2010), Argentine-American analyst, president of the Association for Women in Mathematics
- Chiara Saffirio (born 1985), Italian quantum dynamic systems theorist
- Claudia Sagastizábal, Argentine-Brazilian researcher in convex optimization and energy management
- Ayşe Şahin, Turkish-American expert on dynamical systems
- Laure Saint-Raymond (born 1975), French specialist in partial differential equations, member of the French Academy of Sciences
- Reiko Sakamoto (born 1939), Japanese expert in hyperbolic boundary value problems
- Adriana Salerno (born 1979), Venezuelan-American arithmetic geometer
- Graciela Salicrup (1935–1982), Mexican pioneer in categorical topology
- Judith D. Sally (1937–2024), American researcher in commutative algebra, Noether lecturer
- Sema Salur, Turkish-American differential geometer
- Jean E. Sammet (1928–2017), supervised the first scientific programming group, helped develop COBOL
- Mildred Sanderson (1889–1914), American mathematician, established a correspondence between modular and formal invariants
- Mary Sandoval, American global analyst and spectral geometer
- Marta Sanz-Solé (born 1952), Catalan researcher on stochastic processes, president of the European Mathematical Society
- Winifred Sargent (1905–1979), English researcher on integration theory and BK-spaces
- Alessandra Sarti (born 1974), Italian algebraic geometer, namesake of Sarti surfaces
- Makiko Sasada, Japanese mathematician, expert on hydrodynamic limits of particle systems
- Keri Sather-Wagstaff, American commutative algebraist, academic administrator, and LGBTQ+ activist
- Ruth Lyttle Satter (1923–1989), American researcher on circadian rhythms, namesake of Ruth Lyttle Satter Prize in Mathematics
- Linda Gilbert Saucier (born 1948), American mathematician, prolific textbook author
- Lisa Sauermann (born 1992), German mathematician ranked third in the International Mathematical Olympiad Hall of Fame
- Bonita V. Saunders, American expert on mathematical visualization
- Carla Savage, American researcher on parallel algorithms and combinatorial generation, secretary of AMS
- Cami Sawyer, American and New Zealand expert on distance learning in mathematics
- Karen Saxe, American expert on functional analysis and social choice theory
- Najiba Sbihi (born 1953), Moroccan graph theorist and operations researcher
- Laura Schaposnik (born 1985), Argentine-American algebraic geometer and mathematical physicist
- Renate Scheidler (born 1960), German and Canadian computational number theorist
- Jacquelien Scherpen, Dutch nonlinear control theorist
- Analúcia Schliemann, Brazilian developmental psychologist focusing on mathematical reasoning
- Sibylle Schroll, German representation theorist
- Carol Schumacher (born 1960), Bolivian-born American mathematician, author of inquiry-based learning textbooks
- Jane Cronin Scanlon (1922–2018), American researcher in partial differential equations and mathematical biology
- Alice T. Schafer (1915–2009), American differential geometer, founding member of the Association for Women in Mathematics
- Sakura Schafer-Nameki, German mathematical physicist
- Mary Schaps (born 1948), Israeli mathematician and academic administrator, researcher in deformation theory, group theory, and representation theory
- Doris Schattschneider (born 1939), American mathematician known for writing about tessellations and the art of M. C. Escher
- Michelle Schatzman (1949–2010), French numerical analyst
- Katya Scheinberg, Russian-American expert on derivative-free continuous optimization
- Anne Schilling, American algebraic combinatorialist, representation theorist, and mathematical physicist
- Tamar Schlick, American applied mathematician who develops and applies tools for biomolecule modeling and simulation
- Anja Schlömerkemper (born 1973), German applied mathematician, president of International Society for the Interaction of Mechanics and Mathematics
- Karin Schnass (born 1980), Austrian expert on sparse dictionary learning
- Leila Schneps (born 1961), American-French analytic number theorist and arithmetic geometer, archivist of Grothendieck's works
- Anita Schöbel (born 1969), German operations researcher, expert on optimization for public transportation
- Maria E. Schonbek (born 1979), Argentine-American researcher in fluid dynamics and associated partial differential equations
- Carola-Bibiane Schönlieb (born 1979), Austrian mathematician known for her research in image analysis
- Ida May Schottenfels (1869–1942), American group theorist
- Lynn Schreyer, American applied mathematician, models porous media
- Mary Leontius Schulte (1901–2000), American nun, mathematics educator, and historian of mathematics
- Jennifer Schultens (born 1965), American low-dimensional topologist and knot theorist
- Marie-Hélène Schwartz (1913–2013), French mathematician known for her work on characteristic numbers of spaces with singularities
- Irene Sciriha, Maltese graph theorist
- Jeanette Scissum, American mathematician known for her work on sunspot prediction
- Charlotte Scott (1858–1931), British mathematician who promoted mathematical education of American women
- Elizabeth Scott, American statistician
- Jennifer Scott (born 1960), British numerical analyst
- Catherine Searle, American differential geometer
- Ruthmae Sears, Bahamian-American mathematics educator
- Jennifer Seberry (born 1944), Australian cryptographer, mathematician, and computer scientist, one of the founders of Asiacrypt
- Alexandra Seceleanu, Romanian commutative algebraist
- Rose Whelan Sedgewick (c. 1904–2000), first person to earn a PhD in mathematics from Brown University
- Esther Seiden (1908–2014), Polish-Israeli-American mathematical statistician known for her research on design of experiments and combinatorial design
- Anna Seigal, British applied algebraic geometer
- Annie Selden, American mathematics educator, one of the founders of the Association for Women in Mathematics
- Svetlana Selezneva (born 1963), Russian expert on discrete functions
- Helaine Selin (born 1946), American librarian, historian of science, and ethnomathematician
- Muriel Seltman (1927–2019), British left-wing activist, mathematics educator, historian of mathematics, and author
- Marjorie Senechal (born 1939), American expert on quasicrystals, author on history of science, editor-in-chief of The Mathematical Intelligencer
- Adélia Sequeira, Portuguese applied mathematician specializing in modeling blood flow
- Sylvia Serfaty (born 1975), French expert on superconductivity, winner of the European Mathematical Society Prize
- Vera Serganova, Russian-American researcher on superalgebras and their representations
- Caroline Series (born 1951), English specialist in hyperbolic geometry, Kleinian groups and dynamical systems
- Lily Serna (born 1986), Israeli-Australian arithmetical guru of the SBS game show Letters and Numbers
- Maria Serna, Spanish expert on graph layout and adversarial queueing theory
- Cristina Sernadas (born 1951), Portuguese mathematical logician
- Brigitte Servatius (born 1954), Austrian-American expert on matroids and structural rigidity
- Nataša Šešum, expert in geometric flows
- Lena L. Severance (1855–1942), American mathematician, expert on equipollences
- Ingeborg Seynsche (1905–1994), one of the earliest women to earn a doctorate at the University of Göttingen
- Jeanette Shakalli (born 1985), promoter of mathematics in Panama
- Chehrzad Shakiban (born 1951), first Iranian woman with a Ph.D. in mathematics
- Sara Shakulova (1887–1964), Russian mathematician, first female mathematician of Tatar descent
- Betty Shannon (1922–2017), mathematician and human computer, collaborator with husband Claude Shannon
- Zorya Shapiro (1914–2013), Soviet mathematician, educator and translator
- Tatyana Shaposhnikova (born 1946), Russian-Swedish researcher on multipliers in function spaces, partial differential operators, and history of mathematics
- Mei-Chi Shaw (born 1955), Taiwanese-American researcher on partial differential equations
- Mariya Shcherbina (born 1958), Ukrainian expert on random matrices
- Linda Sheffield, American expert on gifted education in mathematics
- Amy Shell-Gellasch, American historian of mathematics and book author
- Diana Shelstad (born 1947), Australian-American mathematician, formulated the fundamental lemma of the Langlands Program
- Wenxian Shen, Chinese-American dynamical systems theorist
- Irina Shevtsova (born 1983), Russian probability theorist
- Brooke Shipley, American expert in homotopy theory and homological algebra
- Rebecca Shipley, British applied mathematician and healthcare engineer
- Suzanne Shontz, American expert in scientific computing and mesh improvement
- Tatiana Shubin, Soviet-American mathematician, founder of several mathematics circles
- Patricia D. Shure, American mathematics educator and calculus reformer
- Lesley Sibner (1934–2013), American differential geometer and Hodge theorist, produced a constructive proof of the Riemann–Roch theorem
- Martha Siegel, American probability theorist and mathematics educator
- Anna Sierpińska (born 1947), Polish-Canadian scholar of understanding and epistemology in mathematics education
- Mary Silber, American expert in bifurcation theory and pattern formation
- Alice Silverberg (born 1958), American number theorist and cryptographer
- Ruth Silverman (c. 1936–2011), American computational geometer, founder of Association for Women in Mathematics
- Evelyn Silvia (1948–2006), American functional analyst and mathematics educator
- Rodica Simion (1955–2000), Romanian-American pioneer in the study of permutation patterns
- Valeria Simoncini (born 1966), Italian numerical analyst
- Lao Genevra Simons (1870–1949), American mathematician and historian of mathematics
- Hourya Benis Sinaceur (born 1940), Moroccan expert in the theory and history of mathematics
- Margaret P. Sinclair (1950–2012), Canadian mathematics educator
- Mary Emily Sinclair (1878–1955), American mathematician, first woman to earn a doctorate in mathematics at the University of Chicago
- Nathalie Sinclair (born 1970), Canadian researcher in mathematics education
- Suzanne Sindi, American mathematical biologist
- Stephanie Singer, American mathematician and politician, author of books on symmetry
- Sue Singer, British mathematics educator, president of Girls' Schools Association and Mathematical Association
- Ajit Iqbal Singh (born 1943), Indian researcher in functional analysis and harmonic analysis
- Sylvia Skan (1897–1972), British applied mathematician known for the Falkner–Skan boundary layer in fluid mechanics
- Jessica Sklar (born 1973), American mathematician interested in abstract algebra, recreational mathematics, and the popularization of mathematics
- Anna Skripka, Ukrainian-American noncommutative analyst
- Gillian Slater, British mathematician and academic administrator, vice chancellor of Bournemouth University
- Lucy Joan Slater (1922–2008), British expert on hypergeometric functions and the Rogers–Ramanujan identities
- Angela Slavova, Bulgarian expert on waves and cellular neural networks, chair of SIAM
- Alice Slotsky, American historian of mathematics and Assyriologist
- Marian Small (born 1948), Canadian proponent of constructivist mathematical instruction
- Ionica Smeets (born 1979), Dutch number theorist and science communicator
- Deirdre Smeltzer (born 1964), American mathematician, mathematics educator, academic administrator, and textbook author
- Sonja Smets, Belgian and Dutch mathematical logician, works on quantum logic and belief revision
- Adelaide Smith (1878–1938), American mathematician, studied and taught internationally
- Clara Eliza Smith (1865–1943), American mathematician specializing in complex analysis
- Daphne L. Smith, first African-American woman to earn a Ph.D. in mathematics at the Massachusetts Institute for Technology
- Karen E. Smith (born 1965), American specialist in commutative algebra and algebraic geometry
- Kate Smith-Miles, Australian applied mathematician, president of Australian Mathematical Society
- Leslie M. Smith (born 1961), American applied mathematician and engineering physicist working in turbulence
- Martha K. Smith, American mathematics educator and non-commutative algebraist
- Stacey Smith?, Australian-Canadian mathematician known for her scientific work on zombies
- Agata Smoktunowicz (born 1973), Polish-Scottish researcher in abstract algebra, constructed noncommutative nil rings
- Nina Snaith (born 1974), British researcher in random matrix theory, quantum chaos, and zeta functions
- Vera Šnajder (1904–1976), Bosnian mathematician, first Bosnian to publish in mathematics, first female dean in Yugoslavia
- Alena Šolcová (born 1950), Czech applied mathematician and historian of mathematics
- Priyanshi Somani (born 1998), Indian mental calculator
- Mary Somerville (1780–1872), Scottish science writer and polymath, one of two first female members of the Royal Astronomical Society
- Christina Sormani, American researcher on Riemannian geometry, metric geometry, and Ricci curvature
- Vera T. Sós (1930–2023), Hungarian number theorist and combinatorialist
- Mariya Soskova, Bulgarian-American computability theorist
- Chris Soteros, Canadian applied mathematician, studies biomolecules and the knot theory of random space curves
- Hortensia Soto, Mexican-American mathematics educator
- Marilda Sotomayor (born 1944), Brazilian mathematician, economist, and game theorist
- Laila Soueif (born 1956), Egyptian mathematics professor and women's rights activist
- Perla Sousi (born 1984), Greek probability theorist
- Diane Souvaine (born 1954), American computational geometer, advocate for women and minorities in mathematics and gender neutrality in teaching
- Ayşe Soysal (born 1948), Turkish mathematician, president of Boğaziçi University
- Angela Spalsbury (born 1967), American functional analyst and academic administrator
- Britta Späth, German group theorist, representation theorist, and character theorist
- Mary Margaret Speer (1906–1996), American mathematician
- Birgit Speh (born 1949), American expert in Lie groups, namesake of Speh representations
- Domina Eberle Spencer (1920–2022), researcher on electrodynamics and field theory, founded fringe science organization Natural Philosophy Alliance
- M. Grazia Speranza, Italian operations researcher, president of EURO and IFORS
- Pauline Sperry (1885–1967), mathematician, musician, and astronomer, unconstitutionally fired from UC Berkeley for refusing to sign a loyalty oath
- Dolores Richard Spikes (1936–2015), African-American mathematician, first female university chancellor and first female president of a university system in the US
- Nicole Spillane (born 1988), French and Irish applied mathematician
- Vera W. de Spinadel (1929–2017), Argentine-Austrian researcher on metallic means
- Claudia Spiro (1956–2023), American number theorist
- Jean Springer (1939–2007), Jamaican-Canadian specialist in abstract algebra and academic administrator
- Jane Squire (bap. 1686 – 1743), English mathematician studied solutions to finding longitude at sea
- Bhama Srinivasan (1935–2025), representation theorist, president of the Association for Women in Mathematics
- Hema Srinivasan (born 1959), Indian-American mathematician specializing in abstract algebra and algebraic geometry
- Kaye Stacey (born 1948), Australian mathematics educator
- Tanja Stadler (born 1981), German mathematician, expert in phylogenetics
- Julia Stadlmann (born 1998), Austrian analytic number theorist and sieve theorist
- Gigliola Staffilani (born 1966), Italian-American researcher on harmonic analysis and partial differential equations
- Anna Stafford (1905–2004), one of the first postdoctoral researchers at the Institute for Advanced Study
- Helene Stähelin (1891–1970), Swiss mathematician, editor of Bernoulli family letters, and pacifist
- Gwyneth Stallard, British expert on complex dynamics and the iteration of meromorphic functions
- Katherine E. Stange, Canadian-American number theorist
- Zvezdelina Stankova (born 1969), Bulgarian-American expert on permutation patterns, founder of the Berkeley Math Circle
- Nancy K. Stanton, American researcher on complex analysis, partial differential equations, and differential geometry
- Marion Elizabeth Stark (1894—1982), one of the first female American mathematicians to receive a doctorate
- Anastasia Stavrova, Russian expert in algebraic groups, non-associative algebra, and algebraic K-theory
- Jackie Stedall (1950–2014), British historian of mathematics
- Angelika Steger (born 1962), German-Swiss expert on graph theory, randomized algorithms, and approximation algorithms
- Irene Stegun (1919–2008), American mathematician who edited a classic book of mathematical tables
- Gabriele Steidl (born 1963), German researcher in computational harmonic analysis, convex optimization, and image processing
- Mary Kay Stein, American mathematics educator
- Maya Stein, German-Chilean graph theorist
- Berit Stensønes (born 1956), Norwegian mathematician specializing in complex analysis and complex dynamics
- Elizabeth Stephansen (1872–1961), first Norwegian woman to receive a mathematics doctorate
- Edith Stern (born 1952), child prodigy in mathematics and IBM engineer
- Chris Stevens, American topological group theorist, historian of mathematics, and mathematics educator
- Perdita Stevens (born 1966), British algebraist, theoretical computer scientist, and software engineer
- Lorna Stewart, Canadian graph theorist and graph algorithms researcher
- Alice Christine Stickland (1906–1987), British applied mathematician, expert on radio propagation
- Angeline Stickney (1830–1892), American suffragist, abolitionist, and mathematician, namesake of the largest crater on Phobos
- Doris Stockton (1924–2018), American mathematician and textbook author
- Mechthild Stoer, German applied mathematician and operations researcher, namesake of Stoer-Wagner minimum cut algorithm
- Vesna Stojanoska, Macedonian-American homotopy theorist
- Ruth Stokes (1890–1968), American mathematician, astronomer, and cryptologer, pioneer of linear programming, and founder of Pi Mu Epsilon journal
- Yvonne Stokes, Australian expert on fluid mechanics, mathematical biology, and industrial applications of mathematics
- Emily Stone, American mathematician, works in fluid mechanics and dynamical systems
- Betsy Stovall, American harmonic analyst
- Anita Straker, British mathematics educator, president of the Mathematical Association
- Dona Strauss (born 1934), British mathematician, founder of pointless topology and European Women in Mathematics
- Anne Penfold Street (1932–2016), Australian combinatorialist, third woman mathematics professor in Australia
- Ileana Streinu, Romanian-American computational geometer, expert on kinematics and structural rigidity
- Catharina Stroppel (born 1971), German researcher on representation theory, low-dimensional topology, and category theory
- Marilyn Strutchens (born 1962), African-American mathematics educator
- Tatjana Stykel, Russian-German expert on numerical linear algebra, control theory, and differential-algebraic equations
- Dorothy Geneva Styles (1922–1984), American organist, choir director, composer, poet, and mathematician
- Bella Subbotovskaya (1938–1982), Soviet founder of the Jewish People's University
- Indulata Sukla (born 1944), Indian researcher on Fourier series, author of textbook on number theory and cryptography
- Agnès Sulem (born 1959), French applied mathematician, control theorist, and mathematical finance expert
- Catherine Sulem (born 1957), Algerian-born Canadian mathematician and violinist, expert on singularities in wave propagation
- Nike Sun, American probability theorist studying phase transitions and counting complexity
- Iryna Sushko (born 1967), Ukrainian mathematician, applies nonlinear dynamical systems to economics
- Rosamund Sutherland (1947–2019), British mathematics educator
- Louise Nixon Sutton (1925–2006), first African-American woman to earn a mathematics PhD at New York University
- Thyrsa Frazier Svager (1930–1999), African-American mathematician, donated entire salary to support African-American women in mathematics
- Márta Svéd (–2005), Hungarian-Australian mathematician, wrote about non-Euclidean geometry
- Marcia P. Sward (1939–2008), executive director of the Mathematical Association of America
- Lorna Swain (1891–1936), British fluid dynamics researcher, early female lecturer at Cambridge
- Irena Swanson, Yugoslav-born American commutative algebraist and mathematical quilter
- Henda Swart (1939–2016), South African geometer and graph theorist, editor-in-chief of Utilitas Mathematica
- Adela Świątek (1945–2019), Polish mathematician and a popularizer of mathematics
- Jennifer Switkes, American mathematics educator and volunteer prison mathematics instructor
- Polly Sy, Filipino functional analyst
- Esther Szekeres (1910–2005), Hungarian-Australian mathematician posed the happy ending problem in discrete geometry
- Ágnes Szendrei, Hungarian-American expert on universal algebra
- Wanda Szmielew (1918–1976), Polish logician who proved the decidability of the first-order theory of abelian groups
- Zofia Szmydt (1923–2010), Polish researcher on differential equations, potential theory and distributions

== T ==
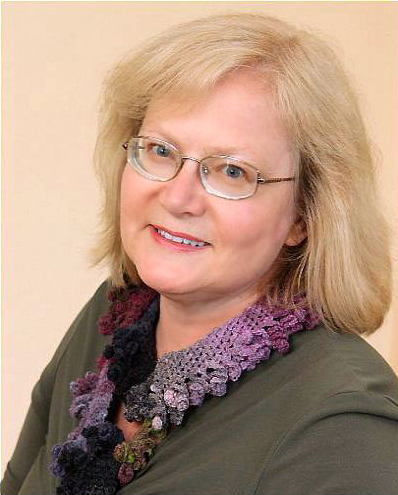
Daina Taimina's crochet illustrates hyperbolic space.

- Laura Taalman, American mathematician known for work on the mathematics of Sudoku and mathematical 3D printing
- Daina Taimiņa (born 1954), Latvian-American mathematician, crochets objects to illustrate hyperbolic space
- Martha Takane, Mexican algebraist and algebraic combinatorist
- Christiane Tammer, German expert in set-valued optimization
- Tan Lei (1963–2016), Chinese-French specialist in complex dynamics and functions of complex numbers
- Betül Tanbay (born 1960), first female president of the Turkish Mathematical Society
- Yunqing Tang, Chinese-American number theorist and arithmetic geometer
- Rosalind Tanner (1900–1992), English mathematician and a historian of mathematics
- Jing Tao, low-dimensional topologist and geometric group theorist
- Anne Taormina, Belgian mathematical physicist interested in string theory, moonshine, and the symmetry of virus capsids
- Gabriella Tarantello (born 1958), Italian mathematician specializing in partial differential equations, differential geometry, and gauge theory
- Éva Tardos (born 1957), Hungarian-American researcher in combinatorial optimization algorithms
- Corina Tarnita, Romanian-American mathematician and theoretical biologist
- Olga Taussky-Todd (1906–1995), Austrian and later Czech-American advocate of matrix theory
- Jean Taylor (born 1944), American mathematician known for her work on soap bubbles and crystals
- Miranda Teboh-Ewungkem (born 1974), American mathematical biologist using ordinary and partial differential equations and statistical methods for modeling the dynamics and transmission of mosquito-borne infectious diseases
- Aretha Teckentrup, British mathematician, data scientist, and numerical analyst
- Mina Teicher, Israeli algebraic geometer
- Monique Teillaud, French computational geometer
- Montserrat Teixidor i Bigas, Spanish-American expert on moduli of vector bundles on curves
- Keti Tenenblat (born 1944), Turkish-Brazilian differential geometer
- Bridget Tenner, American mathematician, expert in permutation patterns
- Katrin Tent (born 1963), German mathematician, expert in group theory, the symmetries of groups, algebraic model theory, and finite geometry
- M. B. W. Tent, American mathematics educator, mathematical biographer
- Chuu-Lian Terng (born 1949), Taiwanese-American differential geometer
- Susanna Terracini (born 1963), Italian mathematician known for her research on chaos in Hamiltonian dynamical systems
- Audrey Terras (born 1942), American number theorist specializing in quantum chaos and zeta functions
- Susanne Teschl (born 1971), Austrian expert on mathematical modeling of breath analysis
- Donna Testerman (born 1960), expert in the representation theory of algebraic groups
- Irina Tezaur, American computational fluid dynamicist, expert on ice sheet dynamics
- Ngamta Thamwattana, Thai-Australian expert in granular materials and nanotechnology
- Theano (6th century BC), one or possibly two different Pythagorean philosophers
- Diana Thomas, American mathematician who studies nutrition and body weight
- Doreen Thomas, South African and Australian mathematician and engineer
- Janet Thomas, founder of the Australian Mathematical Sciences Institute
- Rekha R. Thomas, American mathematician and operations researcher
- Abigail Thompson (born 1958), American low-dimensional topologist, educational reformer
- Frances McBroom Thompson (1942–2014), American mathematics educator and textbook author
- Gillian Thornley (born 1940), New Zealand differential geometer, first woman president of the New Zealand Mathematical Society
- Heidi Thornquist, American applied mathematician, expert on numerical linear algebra and circuit simulation
- Mary Domitilla Thuener (1880–1977), American mathematician, founder of Thomas More College, Kentucky
- Ene-Margit Tiit (born 1934), Estonian mathematician and statistician, founding president of Estonian Statistical Society
- Mary Tiles (born 1946), writer on the philosophy and history of set theory
- Ulrike Tillmann FRS (born 1962), German-English algebraic topologist
- Sheila Tinney (1918–2010), Irish mathematical physicist, first Irishwoman with a mathematical doctorate
- Maryanne Tipler, New Zealand mathematics textbook author
- Françoise Tisseur, French-English numerical analyst
- Jacqueline Naze Tjøtta (1935–2017), French-Norwegian researcher in kinetics, magnetohydrodynamics and theoretical acoustics
- Renate Tobies (born 1947), German historian of mathematics
- Magdalena Toda, Romanian-American differential geometer
- Gordana Todorov (born 1949), American representation theorist and noncommutative algebraist
- Susan Tolman, American symplectic geometer
- Nicole Tomczak-Jaegermann FRSC, Polish-Canadian geometric functional analyst
- Alison Tomlin, British physical chemist and applied mathematician, develops detailed models of combustion
- Cristina Toninelli, Italian probability theorist
- Christina Tønnesen-Friedman, Danish-American Riemannian geometer
- Virginia Torczon, American applied mathematician, computer scientist, and expert in nonlinear optimization
- Antoinette Tordesillas, Australian applied mathematician
- Marie Torhorst (1888–1989), German mathematician, school teacher, and politician
- Anna-Karin Tornberg, Swedish computational mathematician
- Eve Torrence (born 1963), American mathematician, president of Pi Mu Epsilon
- Clara Torres Latorre (born 1997), Spanish mathematics contestant
- Laura Toti Rigatelli (1941–2023), Italian historian of mathematics and biographer of Galois
- Vera Traub, German expert on approximation algorithms in network optimization
- Paula Tretkoff, Australian-American researcher in number theory, noncommutative geometry, and hypergeometric functions
- Christiane Tretter (born 1964), German expert in spectral theory and differential operators
- Věra Trnková (1934–2018) Czech category theorist
- Konstantina Trivisa, Greek-American expert in fluid dynamics and flocking
- A. Mary Tropper (1917–2009), British mathematician, textbook author, and translator
- Mary Esther Trueblood (1872–1939), American mathematician, studied with Felix Klein
- Chrysoula Tsogka, Greek applied mathematician, expert in wave propagation through complex media
- Olga Tsuberbiller (1885–1975), Russian analytical geometer and textbook author
- Virginia Tucker (1909–1985), American human computer at the National Advisory Committee for Aeronautics
- Laurette Tuckerman (born 1956), American and French researcher in computational fluid dynamics
- Annita Tuller (1910–1994), American geometer and textbook author
- Bird Margaret Turner (1877–1962), American mathematician and university professor
- Reidun Twarock, German-born mathematical biologist
- Julianna Tymoczko (born 1975), American algebraic geometer and algebraic combinatorist
- Regina Tyshkevich (1929–2019), Belarusian graph theorist, co-invented split graphs
- Galina Tyurina (1938–1970), Soviet algebraic geometer

== U ==
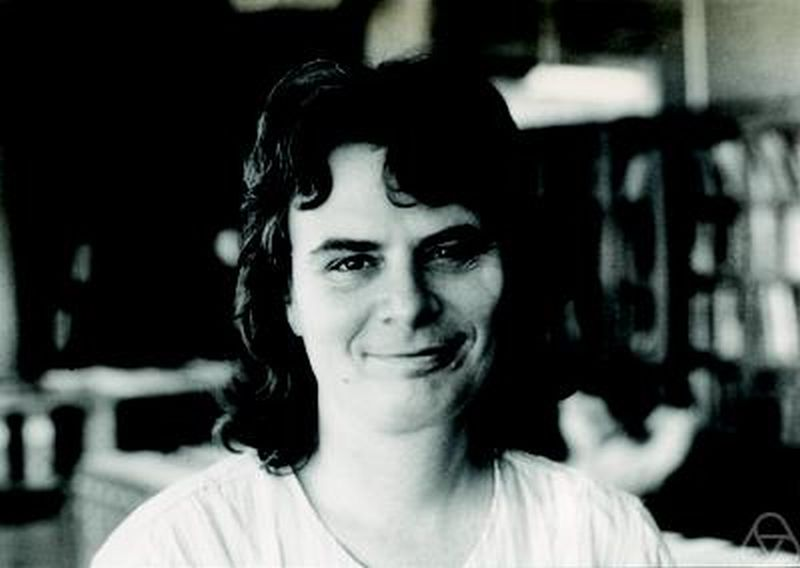
Karen Uhlenbeck is a leading expert in partial differential equations and has worked on a variety of topics related to mathematical physics.

- Olabisi Ugbebor (born 1951), first female mathematics professor in Nigeria
- Karen Uhlenbeck (born 1942), American mathematician, MacArthur Fellow, National Medal of Science, Leroy P. Steele Prize, Abel Prize
- Corinna Ulcigrai (born 1980), Italian researcher on dynamical systems, won European Mathematical Society Prize and Whitehead Prize
- Kristin Umland, American mathematics educator
- Nina Uraltseva (born 1935), Russian mathematical physicist, specialist in nonlinear partial differential equations
- Arantza Urkaregi (born 1954), Spanish mathematician and Basque separatist and feminist politician

== V ==
- Brigitte Vallée (born 1950), French mathematician and computer scientist, expert in lattice basis reduction algorithms
- Clàudia Valls, Spanish and Portuguese mathematician specializing in dynamical systems
- Anna Lavinia Van Benschoten (1866–1927), early American mathematician and university professor
- Pauline van den Driessche (born 1941), British-Canadian pioneer in combinatorial matrix theory and mathematical biology
- Monica VanDieren, American model theorist and academic administrator
- Olena Vaneeva (born 1982), Ukrainian mathematician specializing in group analysis of differential equations
- Ursula van Rienen (born 1957), German applied mathematician, expert in simulating electrical brain stimulation
- Michela Varagnolo, Italian-French representation theorist
- Maria Eulália Vares, Brazilian expert in stochastic processes
- Laura Vargas Koch (born 1990), German algorithmic game theorist and Olympic medal winning judoka
- Alena Varmužová (1939–1997), Czech mathematics educator
- Dorothy Vaughan (1910–2008), African-American mathematician at NASA
- Elena Vázquez Cendón, Spanish expert in modeling waves and shallow water, and numerical solution of hyperbolic problems
- Mariel Vázquez, Mexican mathematical biologist specializing in DNA topology
- Eva Vedel Jensen (born 1951), Danish spatial statistician, stereologist, and stochastic geometer
- Argelia Velez-Rodriguez (born 1936), Black Cuban-American differential geometer
- Tatyana Velikanova (1932–2002), Soviet mathematician, computer programmer, dissident, and political prisoner
- Luitgard Veraart, German financial mathematician
- Michèle Vergne (born 1943), French specialist in analysis and representation theory, member of French Academy of Sciences
- Siobhán Vernon (1932–2002), first Irish-born woman to get a PhD in pure mathematics in Ireland
- Luminița Vese, Romanian specialist in image processing
- Katalin Vesztergombi (born 1948), Hungarian graph theorist and discrete geometer
- Maryna Viazovska (born 1984), Ukrainian mathematician, solved the sphere packing problems in dimensions 8 and 24
- Eva Viehmann (born 1980), German arithmetic geometer
- Marie-France Vignéras (born 1946), French mathematician who proved that one cannot hear the shape of a hyperbolic drum
- Maria Cristina Villalobos, American applied mathematician recognized for her mentorship
- Cynthia Vinzant, American real algebraic geometer
- Bianca Viray, American arithmetic geometer
- Nina Virchenko (born 1930), Ukrainian mathematician and anti-Soviet activist
- Monica Vișan (born 1979), Romanian expert on the nonlinear Schrödinger equation
- Begoña Vitoriano (born 1967), Spanish applied mathematician, uses operations research for humanitarian disaster relief
- Marie A. Vitulli, American algebraic geometer, union organizer, and proponent for women in mathematics on Wikipedia
- Roxana Vivian (1871–1961), first female mathematics doctorate from the University of Pennsylvania
- Karen Vogtmann (born 1949), American geometric group theorist, namesake of Culler–Vogtmann outer space
- Margit Voigt, German expert on graph coloring
- Claire Voisin (born 1962), French expert on Hodge structures and mirror symmetry, member of French Academy of Sciences
- Elisabeth Vreede (1879–1943), Dutch mathematician, astronomer and Anthroposophist
- Kristina Vušković (born 1967), Serbian graph theorist

== W ==
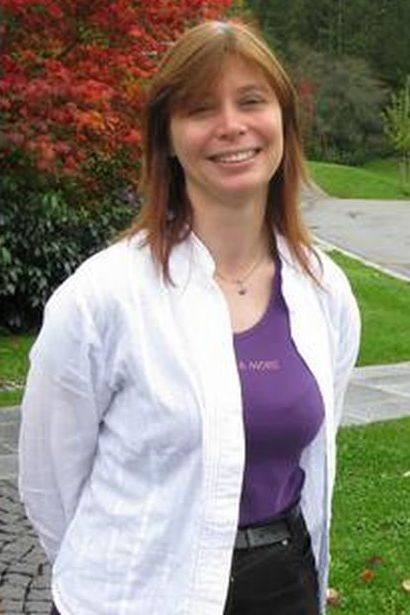
Katrin Wendland, expert on singularities in quantum field theories

- Michelle L. Wachs, American specialist in algebraic combinatorics
- Aissa Wade (born 1967), Senegalese symplectic geometer, president of African Institute for Mathematical Sciences
- Grace Wahba (born 1934), American pioneer in methods for smoothing noisy data
- Nathalie Wahl (born 1976), Belgian topologist
- Yoshiko Wakabayashi (born 1950), Brazilian researcher in combinatorial optimization and polyhedral combinatorics
- Sarah Wakes, New Zealand mathematician and engineer, first female head of mathematics at University of Otago
- Rebecca Waldecker (born 1979), German group theorist
- Irène Waldspurger, French mathematician, expert on phase retrieval
- Muriel Kennett Wales (1913–2009), Irish-Canadian mathematician
- Carol Walker (1935–2026), American group theorist and fuzzy set theorist
- Erica N. Walker, American mathematician, studies racial and gender equity in mathematics education
- Janice B. Walker, American mathematician at Xavier University
- Judy L. Walker, American algebraic coding theorist
- Mary Shore Walker (1882–1952), American mathematician, first woman faculty member at the University of Missouri
- Dorothy Wallace, American number theorist, mathematical biologist, and mathematics educator
- Lynne H. Walling, British number theorist
- Joan E. Walsh (1932–2017), British numerical analyst
- Marion Walter (1928–2021), German-born mathematician who wrote about using mirrors to explore symmetry
- Andrea Walther (born 1970), German expert in automatic differentiation
- Chelsea Walton (born 1983), African-American researcher in noncommutative algebra
- Hong Wang, Chinese mathematical analyst known for work on Kakeya conjecture
- Yilin Wang, French and Swiss expert in complex analysis and probability theory
- Yuan Wang, Chinese-American control theorist
- Yusu Wang, Chinese computational geometer and computational topologist
- Wang Zhenyi (1768–1797), Qing dynasty mathematician and astronomer
- Lesley Ward, Australian harmonic and complex analyst
- Rachel Ward, American applied mathematician who researches machine learning and signal processing
- Virginia Warfield, American mathematics educator
- Mary Wynne Warner (1932–1998), British pioneer in fuzzy topology
- Simone Warzel (born 1973), German mathematical physicist, expert on the many-body problem
- Talitha Washington (born 1974), American applied mathematician and mathematics educator
- Sarah L. Waters, British expert in fluid mechanics and tissue engineering
- Ann E. Watkins, American statistics educator, president of Mathematical Association of America
- Anne Watson, British mathematics educator
- Charlotte Watts (born 1962), British mathematical epidemiologist
- Megan Wawro, American scholar of mathematics education focusing on inquiry-based linear algebra and its applications in quantum mechanics
- Johanna Weber (1910–2014), German-British mathematician and aerodynamicist, contributed to supersonic aircraft design
- Charlotte Wedell (1862–1953), one of four women at the first International Congress of Mathematicians
- Suzanne Weekes, American mathematician, cofounder of the Mathematical Sciences Research Institute Undergraduate Program
- Katrin Wehrheim (born 1974), American symplectic topologist and gauge theorist
- Guofang Wei (born 1965), Chinese-American differential geometer, found new positively-curved manifolds
- Tilla Weinstein (1934–2002), American differential geometer
- Marie Johanna Weiss (1903–1952), American mathematics researcher and textbook author
- Florence Weldon (1858–1936), British human computer, analysed biological variation
- Katrin Wendland (born 1970), German mathematical physicist, expert on singularities in quantum field theories
- Annette Werner (born 1966), German expert on diophantine geometry and non-Archimedean algebraic geometry
- Elisabeth M. Werner, researcher on convex geometry, functional analysis, and probability theory
- Maria Westdickenberg, American-German applied mathematical analyst
- Eléna Wexler-Kreindler (1931–2002), Romanian-French algebraist
- Anna Johnson Pell Wheeler (1883–1966), American researcher on infinite-dimensional linear algebra
- Mary Wheeler (born 1931), American expert on domain decomposition methods for partial differential equations
- Marion Ballantyne White (1871–1958), American mathematician and university professor
- Sue Whitesides, Canadian mathematician and computer scientist, expert in computational geometry and graph drawing
- Alice S. Whittemore (1936–2025), American group theorist, biostatistician, and epidemiologist who studies the effects of genetics and lifestyle on cancer
- Kirsten Wickelgren, American number theorist and geometer
- Margaret Wiecek, Polish-American operations researcher, expert on multi-objective optimization
- Sylvia Wiegand (born 1945), American algebraist, president of the Association for Women in Mathematics
- Anna Wienhard (born 1977), German differential geometer
- Lynda Wiest, American mathematics education researcher
- Michèle Wigger, Swiss and French information theorist
- Evelyn Prescott Wiggin (1900–1964), American mathematician and university professor
- Geertruida Wijthoff (1859–1953), Dutch mathematician and teacher
- Marie S. Wilcox (died 1995), American high school mathematics teacher, textbook author, and president of National Council of Teachers of Mathematics
- Trena Wilkerson, American mathematics educator, president of National Council of Teachers of Mathematics
- Amie Wilkinson (born 1968), American researcher in ergodic theory and smooth dynamical systems
- Emily Willbanks (1930–2007), American mathematician who contributed to defense weapons applications and high performance storage
- Margaret Willerding (1919–2003), American mathematician and textbook author
- Karen Willcox, New Zealand applied mathematician, expert on reduced-order modeling and multi-fidelity methods
- Elizabeth Williams (1895–1986), British mathematician and educationist
- Emily Coddington Williams (1873–1952), American historian of mathematics, translator, novelist, playwright, and biographer
- Kim Williams, scholar of connections between mathematics and architecture
- Lauren Williams, American expert on cluster algebras and tropical geometry
- Roselyn E. Williams, American mathematician, founder of National Math Alliance
- Ruth J. Williams, American probability theorist, president of Institute of Mathematical Statistics
- Ruth Margaret Williams (born 1945), British mathematical physicist, researches discrete gravity
- Sheila Oates Williams (1939–2024), British and Australian abstract algebraist
- Talithia Williams, American statistician and mathematician who researches the spatiotemporal structure of data
- Virginia Vassilevska Williams, Bulgarian-American researcher on graph algorithms and fast matrix multiplication
- Stephanie van Willigenburg, Canadian researcher in algebraic combinatorics and quasisymmetric functions
- Elizabeth Wilmer, American expert on Markov chain mixing times
- Helen Wilson (mathematician) (born 1973), British expert on non-Newtonian fluids, president of British Society of Rheology
- Ulrica Wilson, African-American mathematician specializing in noncommutative rings and the combinatorics of matrices
- Helen Wily (1921–2009), New Zealand mathematician and statistician
- Sarah Witherspoon, American mathematician interested in abstract algebra
- Emily E. Witt, American commutative algebraist and representation theorist
- Barbara Wohlmuth, German expert on the numerical solution of partial differential equations
- Julia Wolf, British mathematician specialising in arithmetic combinatorics
- Louise Adelaide Wolf (1898–1962), American mathematician and university professor
- Gail Wolkowicz, Canadian mathematical biologist known for her work on the competitive exclusion principle
- Maria Wonenburger (1927–2014), Galician-American group theorist, first Spanish Fulbright scholar in mathematics
- Carol Wood (born 1945), American expert in model-theoretic algebra, president of American Women in Mathematics
- Melanie Wood (born 1981), first female American to compete in the International Mathematical Olympiad
- Ruth Goulding Wood (1875–1935), American non-Euclidean geometer
- Sarah Woodhead (1851–1912), first woman to pass the Cambridge University mathematical Tripos examination
- Mary Lee Woods (1924–2017), British mathematician and computer programmer
- Carol S. Woodward, American expert in numerical algorithms and software
- Margaret H. Wright (born 1944), American researcher in optimization, linear algebra, and scientific computing
- Dorothy Maud Wrinch (1894–1976), Argentine-English mathematician and biochemical theorist, expert in protein structure
- Jang-Mei Wu, Taiwanese-American complex analyst
- Sijue Wu (born 1964), Chinese-American expert in the mathematics of water waves
- Emily Kathryn Wyant (1897–1942), American mathematician, founder of honor society Kappa Mu Epsilon
- Lucy R. Wyatt, British mathematician and oceanographer, studies high frequency radar oceanography and ocean surface waves
- Urszula Wybraniec-Skardowska (born 1940), Polish logician
- Cynthia Wyels, American mathematician known for her mentorship of Latino students

== X ==
- Ling Xiao, differential geometer and expert on geometric flow
- Dianna Xu, American mathematician and computer scientist who studies computational problems on curves and surfaces
- Xu Ruiyun, first Chinese woman to earn a doctorate in mathematics

== Y ==
- Carolyn Yackel, American commutative algebraist and mathematical fiber artist
- Erna Beth Yackel (1939–2022), American mathematics educator
- Mayuko Yamashita, Japanese mathematician and mathematical physicist
- Catherine Yan, Chinese-American mathematician interested in algebraic combinatorics
- Grace Yang, Chinese-American expert on stochastic processes in the physical sciences, asymptotic theory, and survival analysis
- Betsy Yanik, American mathematics educator, president of Women and Mathematics Education
- Elena Yanovskaya (born 1938), Soviet and Russian game theorist
- Sofya Yanovskaya (1896–1966), restored mathematical logic research in Soviet Union, edited mathematical works of Karl Marx
- Jane Ye, Chinese-Canadian researcher in variational analysis
- Karen Yeats (born 1980), Canadian mathematician whose research connects combinatorics to quantum field theory
- Florence Yeldham (1877–1945), British school teacher and historian of arithmetic
- Miriam Yevick (1924–2018), Dutch-American mathematical physicist
- Yiqun Lisa Yin, Chinese-American cryptographer, broke the SHA-1 hash scheme and helped develop the RC6 block cipher
- Ruriko Yoshida, Japanese-American combinatorist, statistician, phylogeneticist, and operations researcher
- Anna Irwin Young (1873–1920), charter member of the Mathematical Association of America
- Cynthia Y. Young, American applied mathematician, textbook author, and academic administrator
- Lai-Sang Young (born 1952), Hong Kong born dynamical systems theorist
- Mabel Minerva Young (1872–1963), American geometer
- Virginia R. Young, American expert on the mathematics of insurance
- Noriko Yui, Japanese-Canadian researcher on arithmetic geometry, mathematical physics, and mirror symmetry
- Mariette Yvinec, French computational geometer

== Z ==
- Sara Zahedi (born 1981), Iranian-Swedish researcher in computational fluid dynamics, former child refugee, and winner of EMS Prize
- Martina Zähle (born 1950), German stochastic geometer and geometric measure theorist
- Frieda Zames (1932–2005), American mathematician and disability rights activist
- Antonella Zanna, Italian-Norwegian numerical analyst
- Lyubov Zapolskaya (1871–1943), Russian mathematician
- Thaleia Zariphopoulou (born 1962), Greek-American expert in mathematical finance
- Claudia Zaslavsky (1917–2006), American mathematics educator and ethnomathematician
- Ewelina Zatorska, Polish mathematical analyst
- Anna Zdunik, Polish researcher on dynamical systems
- Mary Lou Zeeman, British expert on dynamical systems and their application to mathematical biology
- Sarah Zerbes (born 1978), German and British algebraic number theorist
- Ping Zhang, graph theorist and textbook author
- Tianyi Zheng, Chinese-American probability and geometric group theorist
- Rozetta Zhilina (1933–2003), Soviet expert in computational problems for nuclear weapons
- Chenchang Zhu, Chinese differential geometer and mathematical physicist
- Tamar Ziegler (born 1971), Israeli researcher in ergodic theory and arithmetic combinatorics, won Erdős Prize
- Magdolna Zimányi (1934–2016), pioneer of Hungarian computing
- Susanna Zimmermann (born 1987), Swiss birational geometer
- Justyna Zwolak, Polish-American applied mathematician, applied machine learning to the control of quantum dots

== See also ==
- Association for Women in Mathematics
- European Women in Mathematics
- List of female scientists
- List of women in statistics
- Noether Lecture
- Timeline of women in mathematics in the United States
- Timeline of women in mathematics worldwide
- Women in computing
- Women in science
