= AWM Service Award =

Mathematics award

The AWM Service Award is an annual award given by the Association for Women in Mathematics. The AWM depends largely on the work of volunteers. In order to recognize individuals for helping to promote and support women in mathematics through exceptional volunteer service to the association the AWM Executive Committee approved the AWM Service Award in 2012 and it was first awarded in 2013. The recipients of the award are recognized at the annual AWM Reception and Awards Presentation at the Joint Mathematics Meetings and in the Notices of the American Mathematical Society.

== List of Award Winners ==
Winners of the AWM Service Award
Award date	Recipient	Institution
2026	Betsy Stovall	University of Wisconsin
2026	Matthew Krauel	California State University, Sacramento
2025	AWM Distinguished Service Award: Anna Leggett	Loyola University Chicago
2025	Kuei-Nuan Lin	Penn State Greater Allegheny
2025	Mei Yin	University of Denver
2024	Johanna Franklin	Hofstra University
2024	Karoline Pershell	Service Robotics & Technologies, Inc.
2023	Katherine Dowd	University of Minnesota
2023	Robin Marek	Kingston, Rhode Island
2023	Tracy Weyand	Rose Hulman Institute of Technology
2022	Ellen Kirkman	Wake Forest University
2022	The Notable Women in Math Playing Cards Management Committee	sarah-marie belcastro, Sherli Koshy-Chenthittayil, Linda McGuire, Monica Morales Hernandez, Denise A. Rangel Tracy, Oscar Vega
2021	Emille D. Lawrence	University of San Francisco
2020	Raegan Higgins	Texas Tech University
2020	Omayra Ortega	Arizona State University
2020	Denise A. Rangel Tracy	Fairleigh Dickinson University
2019	Michelle Snider	Institute for Defense Analyses
2018	Jacqueline Dewar	Loyola Marymount University
2018	Sarah J. Greenwald	Appalachian State University
2018	Jacqueline Jensen-Vallin	Loyola Marymount University
2017	Kathleen (Fowler) Kavanagh	Clarkson University
2017	Michelle Manes	University of Hawaii
2017	Maura Mast	Fordham University
2017	Marie A. Vitulli	University of Oregon
2016	Heather Lewis	Nazareth College of Rochester
2016	Heather Russell	University of Richmond
2016	Rebecca Segal	Virginia Commonwealth University
2016	AWM Lifetime Service Award: Bettye Anne Case	Florida State University
2015	Irina Mitrea	Temple University
2015	Kathryn Leonard	California State University Channel Islands
2015	Elebeoba E. May	University of Houston
2015	Christina Sormani	City University of New York, Graduate Center and Lehman College
2014	Tai Melcher	University of Virginia
2014	Katharine Ott	University of Kentucky
2013	Rebecca A. Herb	University of Maryland College Park
2013	Margaret Bayer	University of Kansas
2013	Holly Gaff	Old Dominion University
2013	Erica Voolich	Somerville High School, Massachusetts
2013	Pao-sheng Hsu	University of Maine Orono
2013	Rachel Kuske	University of British Columbia
2013	Victoria Howle	Texas Tech University
2013	Shari Moskow	Drexel University
2013	Krystyna Kuperberg	Auburn University
2013	Rebecca Goldin	George Mason University

== See also ==
- List of mathematics awards
