= Malena Español =

Argentine-American mathematician

Malena I. Español
- Born: Buenos Aires, Argentina
- Education: Tufts University; University of Buenos Aires
- Awards: Karen EDGE Fellow (2022); Haimo Award (2024); Fellow of the Association for Women in Mathematics (2027)
- Scientific career
- Fields: Applied Mathematics; Computational Mathematics
- Workplaces: The University of Akron; Arizona State University
- Thesis: Multilevel Methods for Discrete Ill-Posed Problems: Application to Deblurring (2009)
- Doctoral advisor: Misha Kilmer

Malena Inés Español is an Argentine-American applied mathematician. Her research involves developing computational methods for solving inverse problems in imaging. She is an associate professor in the Arizona State University School of Mathematical and Statistical Sciences.

== Education and career ==
Español attended the Colegio Nacional de Buenos Aires (National School of Buenos Aires), a public high school in Buenos Aires, Argentina, affiliated with the University of Buenos Aires. She was an undergraduate at the University of Buenos Aires, where she earned a licenciate in applied mathematics in 2003. She moved to Tufts University in the US for graduate study in mathematics, earning a master's degree in 2005 and completing her Ph.D. in 2009. Her doctoral dissertation, Multilevel Methods for Discrete Ill-Posed Problems: Application to Deblurring, was supervised by Misha Kilmer.

After postdoctoral research with Michael Ortiz at the California Institute of Technology, Español took an assistant professorship at the University of Akron in 2012, and was tenured as an associate professor there in 2018. She moved to Arizona State University in 2019, returning to the assistant professor rank, and was again promoted to associate professor in 2024.

== Recognition ==
The EDGE Foundation named Español as the 2022 Karen EDGE Fellow.

She is a 2024 recipient of the Deborah and Franklin Haimo Award for Distinguished College or University Teaching of Mathematics.

She was named 2027 Fellow of the Association for Women in Mathematics for "her extraordinary commitment to mentoring and advancing women in mathematics through leadership, inclusive program development, and transformative outreach. Her mentorship, service to AWM, and training networks, have created inclusive pathways across all career stages".
