= Mitrea =

Mitrea is a Romanian surname. Notable people with this name include:

- Bogdan Mitrea (born 1987), Romanian footballer
- Dorina Mitrea (born 1965), Romanian-American mathematician
- Ionuț Mitrea (born 1990), Romanian canoeist
- Irina Mitrea, Romanian-American mathematician
- Marius Mitrea (born 1982), Romanian rugby union referee
- Miron Mitrea (born 1956), Romanian engineer and politician
