= Karen M. Bliss =

American mathematician

Karen M. Bliss is an American applied mathematician who specializes in biomedical applications and materials science. She has co-authored many modeling handbooks, most notably, Math Modeling: Getting Started and Getting Solutions, for Society for Industrial and Applied Mathematics (SIAM) in 2014 which is used by teachers and students learning the basics along with those participating in the Mathematical Contest in Modeling.

== Education and career ==
For her undergraduate degree, Bliss attended the University of Missouri – Rolla (Missouri University of Science and Technology) from 1994 to 1998 and graduated summa cum laude with a Bachelor of Science in applied mathematics. She attended North Carolina State University for her graduate studies, earning her Master of Science in applied mathematics in May 2000. From 2000 to 2004, Bliss served in the US Navy as a mathematics instructor for machinery operators. Under supervision of Harvey Banks and Hien Tran, she earned her PhD in Applied Mathematics in 2011 from North Carolina State University, with her dissertation on modeling red blood cells in kidney disease patients.

After postdoctoral research at the National Academy of Sciences as a Davies Fellow and teaching at the United States Military Academy, Bliss became an assistant professor of Mathematics at Quinnipiac University. After moving to the Virginia Military Institute as an associate professor in the department of Applied Mathematics and VCUR Programs Coordinator, Bliss left academia in 2023 to work as Senior Manager of Education and Outreach for the Society for Industrial and Applied Mathematics.

== Selected publications ==
With Kathleen Fowler and Benjamin J. Galluzzo, Bliss published Math Modeling: Getting Started and Getting Solutions for the MathWorks Math Modeling Challenge. In 2018, Bliss published a more advanced handbook titled, Math Modeling: Computing and Communicating with Benjamin J. Galluzzo, Kathleen R. Kavanagh, and Rachel Levy.

Her research papers include:

- Analysis of intrinsic stability criteria for isotropic third-order Green elastic and compressible neo-Hookean solids. J. D. Clayton and K. M. Bliss. Mechanics of Materials, volume 68, pages 104 – 119. January 2014. doi: https://doi.org/10.1016/j.mechmat.2013.08.007
- Modeling Red Blood Cell and Iron Dynamics in Patients with Chronic Kidney Disease. H. T. Banks, K. M. Bliss, H. T. Tran. International Journal of Pure and Applied Mathematics, v75, no1, 2012. https://www.researchgate.net/publication/267661351_Modeling_red_blood_cell_and_iron_dynamics_in_patients_with_Chronic_kidney_disease
- NCSU Center for Research in Scientific Computation Technical Report: A Computational Model of Red Blood Cell Dynamics in Patients with Chronic Kidney Disease. K. M. Bliss, H. T. Banks, P. Kotanko, H. T. Tran. February 2011. https://www.researchgate.net/publication/268292348_A_Computational_Model_of_Red_Blood_Cell_Dynamics_in_Patients_with_Chronic_Kidney_Disease
- NCSU Center for Research in Scientific Computation Technical Report: Development of a Model for Erythropoiesis in Patients with Chronic Kidney Disease. K. M. Bliss, H. T. Banks, P. Kotanko, H. T. Tran. January 2010. https://www.researchgate.net/publication/242777639_Development_of_a_Model_of_Erythropoiesis_in_Patients_with_Chronic_Kidney_Disease
