= Rhonda Hughes =

American mathematician

Rhonda Jo Hughes
- Born: Rhonda Weisberg; September 28, 1947 (age 79)
- Education: University of Illinois at Chicago
- Known for: Founding the EDGE Program
- Awards: Fellow of the Association for Women in Mathematics (2017); Gweneth Humphreys Award (2010)
- Scientific career
- Fields: Mathematics, Functional analysis
- Workplaces: Tufts University, Bryn Mawr College
- Thesis: Semi-Groups of Unbounded Linear Operators in Banach Space (1975)
- Doctoral advisor: Shmuel Kantorovitz

Rhonda Jo Hughes (born Rhonda Weisberg September 28, 1947) is an American mathematician, the Helen Herrmann Professor Emeritus of Mathematics at Bryn Mawr College.

== Education ==
Hughes grew up on the South Side of Chicago. She attended Gage Park High School, where she was a cheerleader and valedictorian of her class. She studied engineering at the University of Illinois at Urbana–Champaign for one and a half years, then left school and worked for six months before resuming her education at the University of Illinois at Chicago on an Illinois State Scholarship studying mathematics. There, she came under the mentorship of Yoram Sagher, who encouraged her to pursue graduate studies in mathematics. She earned a Ph.D. from the same university in 1975, under the supervision of Shmuel Kantorovitz, with a dissertation entitled Semi-Groups of Unbounded Linear Operators in Banach Space.

== Career ==
She began her teaching career at Tufts University then spent a year as a fellow at the Bunting Institute of Radcliffe College. She moved to Bryn Mawr College in 1980, where she served as department chair for six years. She is the Helen Herrmann professor emeritus of mathematics at Bryn Mawr, and retired in 2011.

She was president of the Association for Women in Mathematics (AWM) 1987–1988. She has served on the Commission on Physical Science, Mathematics, and Applications of the United States National Research Council. She served as an American Mathematical Society (AMS) Council member at large from 1988 to 1990.

She and Sylvia Bozeman organized the Spelman-Bryn Mawr Summer Mathematics Program for female undergraduate students from 1992 to 1994. In 1998, they founded the EDGE Program (Enhancing Diversity in Graduate Education), a transition program for women entering graduate programs in the mathematical sciences. The program is now in its twentieth year.

Her most recent research involves ill-posed problems.

== Honors ==
In 1998, Hughes received the Deborah and Franklin Haimo Award for Distinguished College or University Teaching of Mathematics.

In 2004 she received the AAAS Mentor Award for Lifetime Achievement, in 2010 the Gweneth Humphreys Award for Mentorship of Undergraduate Women in Mathematics of the Association for Women in Mathematics, and in 2013 she received the Elizabeth Bingham Award of the Philadelphia Chapter of the Association for Women in Science.

In 2017, she was selected as a fellow of the Association for Women in Mathematics in the inaugural class. She was named as a Fellow of the American Mathematical Society, in its 2027 class of fellows.
