= Rachel Levy =

Rachel Levy is the name of:

- Gertrude Rachel Levy (1884–1966), British cultural historian who published under the name G. Rachel Levy
- R.L. Kelly, American electropop musician born as Rachel Levy
- Rachel Levy (mathematician)
- Rachel Levy (1984 or 1985–2002), Israeli victim of the Kiryat HaYovel supermarket bombing
- Sergeant Rachel Levy (circa 1982 – 2001), Israeli victim of the 2001 Azor attack
- Rachel Levy, American college basketball player on the 2017–18 Harvard Crimson women's basketball team

It is also the name of fictional characters:

- Rachel Levy, fictional character in 1930 mystery novel by Dorothy Sayers, Strong Poison
- Rachel Levy, fictional character in British medical drama television series Holby City (series 17)
- Rachel Lévy, fictional character in French soap opera television series Plus belle la vie
- Rachel Levy, fictional character in Israeli comical musical telenovela HaShir Shelanu
- Rachel Levy, fictional character in American comedy-drama The Family Tree (2011 film)
