= Thomas Harriot =

English astronomer, mathematician, ethnographer and translator

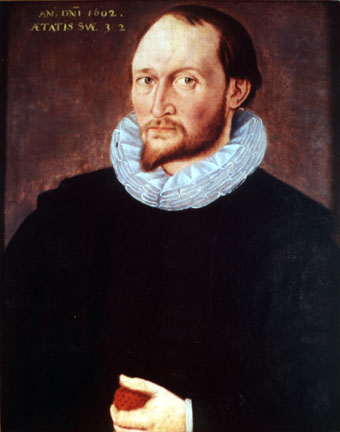
- Portrait often claimed to be Thomas Harriot (1602), which hangs in Trinity College, Oxford. The provenance of this portrait is not known, and there is little evidence to link it to Harriot.
- Born: c. 1560; Oxford, England
- Died: 2 July 1621 (aged 60–61); London, England
- Education: St Mary Hall, Oxford
- Scientific career
- Fields: Astronomy, mathematics, ethnography

Thomas Harriot (/ˈhæriət/; c. 1560 – 2 July 1621), also spelled Harriott, Hariot or Heriot, was an English astronomer, mathematician, ethnographer and translator to whom the theory of refraction is attributed. Thomas Harriot was also recognized for his contributions in navigational techniques, working closely with John White to create advanced maps for navigation. While Harriot worked extensively on numerous papers on the subjects of astronomy, mathematics and navigation, he remains obscure because he published little of it, namely only The Briefe and True Report of the New Found Land of Virginia (1588). This book includes descriptions of English settlements and financial issues in Virginia at the time. He is sometimes credited with the introduction of the potato to the British Isles. Harriot invented binary notation and arithmetic several decades before Gottfried Wilhelm Leibniz, but this remained unknown until the 1920s. He was also the first person to make a drawing of the Moon through a telescope, on 5 August 1609, about four months before Galileo Galilei.

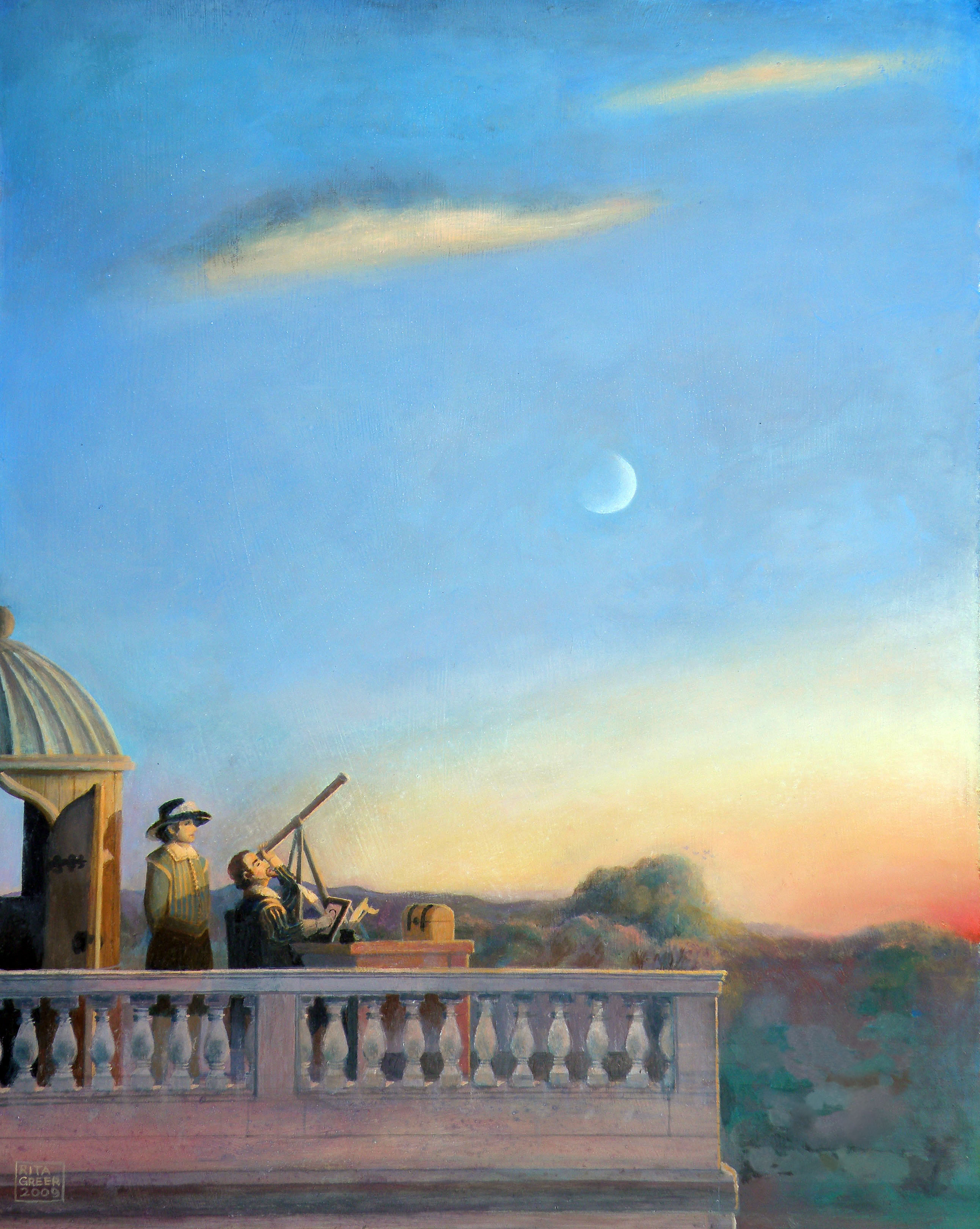
Thomas Harriot observing the Moon through his telescope from the roof of Syon House in west London

After graduating from St Mary Hall, Oxford, Harriot travelled to the Americas, accompanying the 1585 expedition to Roanoke island funded by Sir Walter Raleigh and led by Sir Ralph Lane. He learned the Carolina Algonquian language from two Native Americans, Wanchese and Manteo, and could translate it, making him a vital member of the expedition. On his return to England, he worked for the 9th Earl of Northumberland.

== Biography ==
=== Early life and education ===
Born in 1560 in Oxford, England, Thomas Harriot attended St Mary Hall, Oxford. His name appears in the hall's registry dating from 1577.

Harriot started to study navigation shortly after receiving a bachelor's degree from Oxford University. The study of navigation that Harriot studied concentrated on the idea of the open seas and how to cross to the New World from the Atlantic Ocean. He used instruments such as the astrolabe and sextants to aid his studies of navigation. After educating himself by incorporating ideals from his astronomic and nautical studies, Harriot taught other captains his navigational techniques in Raleigh. His findings were recorded in the Articon but were later never found.

=== Roanoke ===
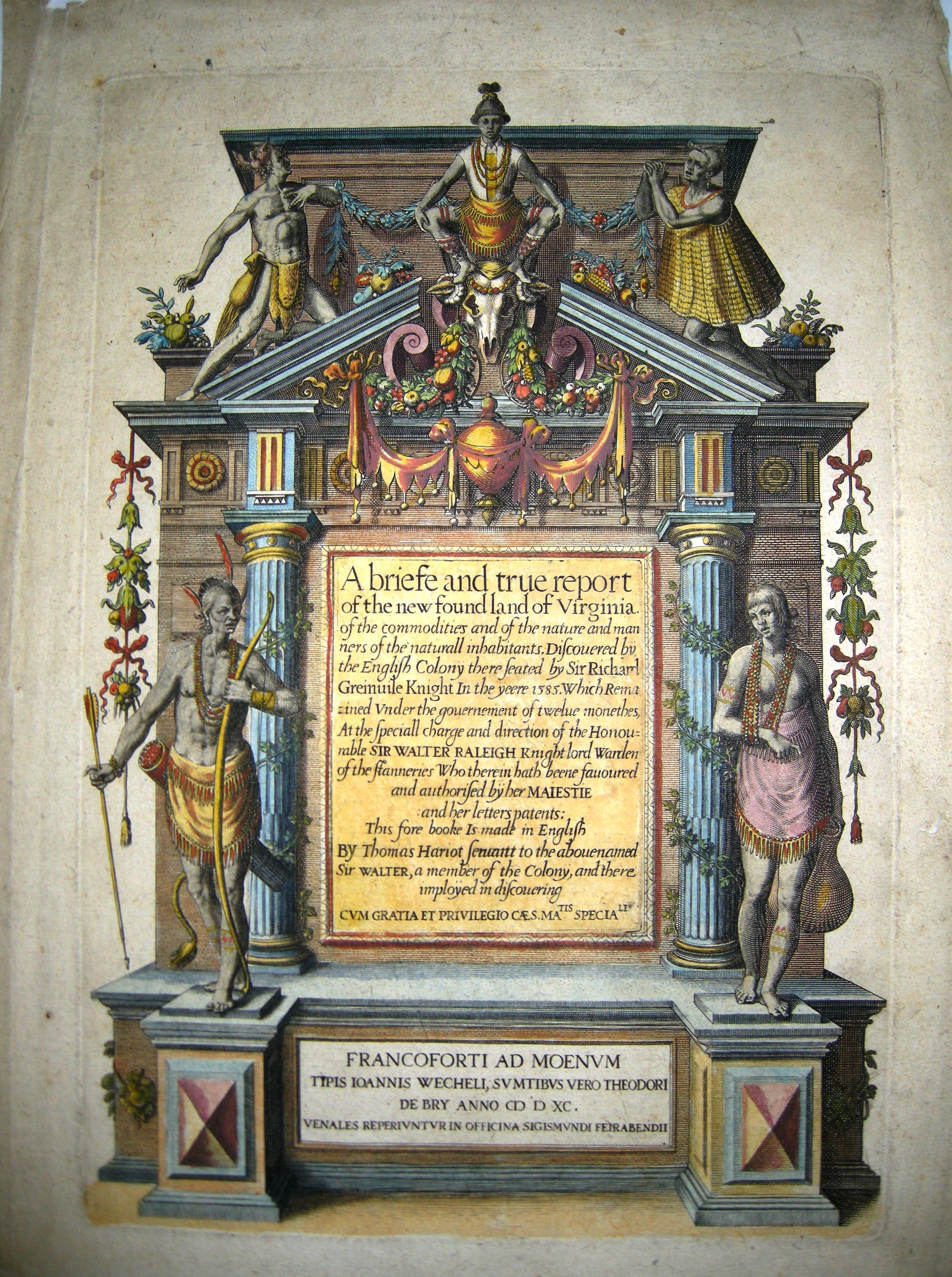
Title page of A Briefe and True Report of the Newfound Land of Virginia

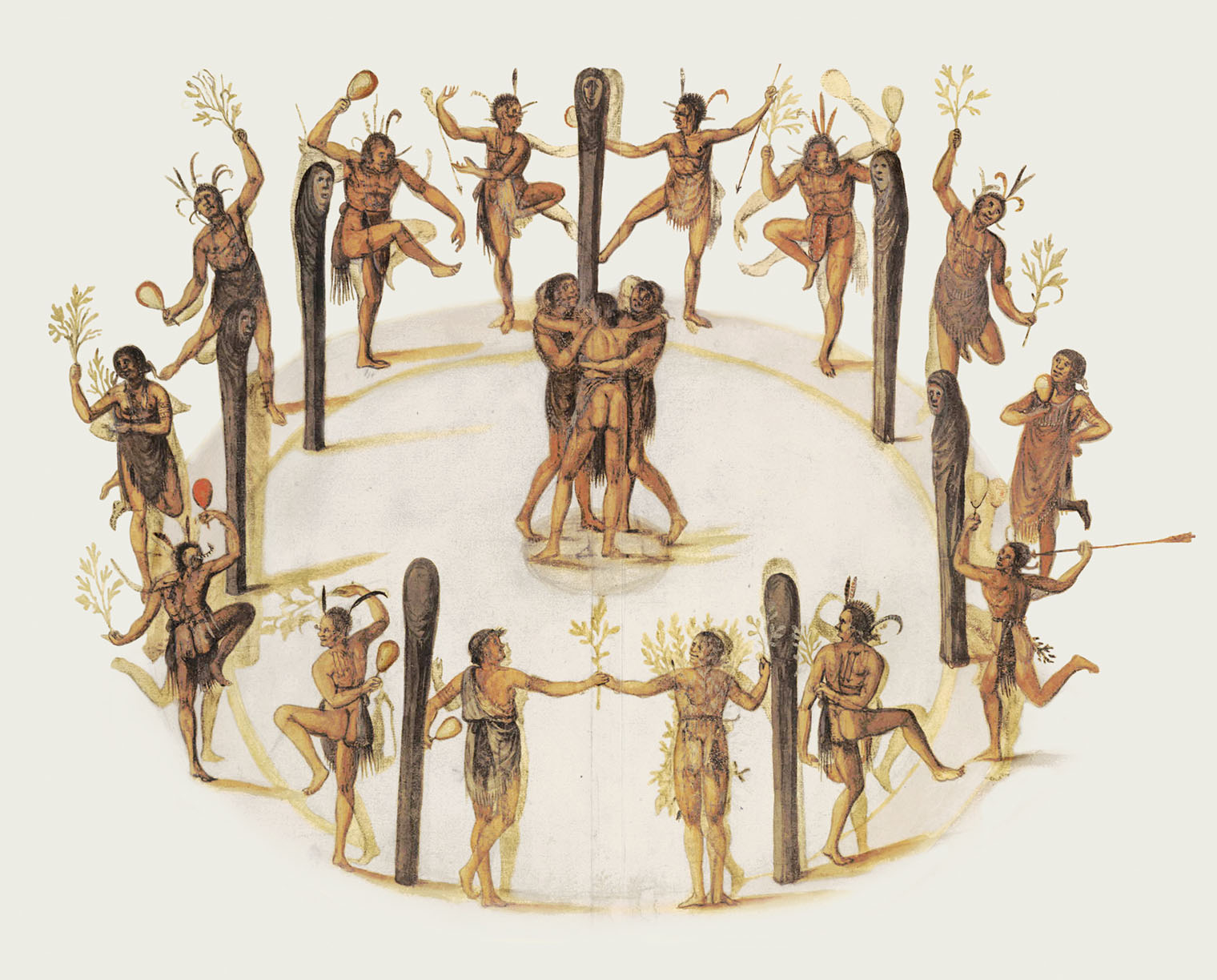
Watercolour by John White of Roanoke Indians

After his graduation from Oxford in 1580, Harriot was first hired by Sir Walter Raleigh as a mathematics tutor; he used his knowledge of astronomy/astrology to provide navigational expertise, help design Raleigh's ships, and serve as his accountant. Prior to his expedition with Raleigh, Harriot wrote a treatise on navigation. He made efforts to communicate with Manteo and Wanchese, two Native Americans who had been brought to England. Harriot devised a phonetic alphabet to transcribe their Carolina Algonquian language.

Harriot and Manteo spent many days in one another's company; Harriot interrogated Manteo closely about life in the New World and learned much that was to the advantage of the English settlers. He believed that Indigenous peoples were intelligent but had inferior technology. In addition, he perceived Native Americans as having a sense of awe towards European inventions:

Many things they sawe with us...as mathematical instruments, sea compasses...[and] spring clocks that seemed to goe of themselves – and many other things we had – were so strange unto them, and so farre exceeded their capacities to comprehend the reason and meanes how they should be made and done, that they thought they were rather the works of gods than men.

He made only one expedition, around 1585–86, and spent some time in the New World visiting Roanoke Island off the coast of North Carolina, expanding his knowledge by improving his understanding of the Carolina Algonquian language. As the only Englishman who had learned Carolina Algonquian prior to the voyage, Harriot was vital to the success of the expedition.

His account of the voyage, named A Briefe and True Report of the New Found Land of Virginia, was published in 1588 (probably written a year before). The True Report contains an early account of the Native American population encountered by the expedition; it proved very influential upon later English explorers and colonists. He wrote: "Whereby it may be hoped, if means of good government be used, that they may in short time be brought to civility and the embracing of true religion." At the same time, his views of Native Americans' industry and capacity to learn were later largely ignored in favor of the parts of the "True Report" about extractable minerals and resources.

As a scientific adviser during the voyage, Harriot was asked by Raleigh to find the most efficient way to stack cannonballs on the deck of the ship. His ensuing theory about the close-packing of spheres shows a striking resemblance to atomism and modern atomic theory, which he was later accused of believing. His correspondence about optics with Johannes Kepler, in which he described some of his ideas, later influenced Kepler's conjecture.

=== Later years ===
Harriot was employed for many years by Henry Percy, 9th Earl of Northumberland, with whom he resided at Syon House, which was run by Henry Percy's cousin Thomas Percy.

The Duke was surrounded by many scholars and learned men and provided a more stable form of patronage than Raleigh. In 1595 the Duke of Northumberland made property in Durham over to Harriot, moving him up the social ladder into 'the landed gentry'. Not long after the Durham transactions, the Duke gave Harriot the use of one of the houses on the estate at Syon, to work on optics and the law of refraction.

Harriot's sponsors began to fall from favor: Raleigh was the first, and Harriot's other patron Henry Percy, the Earl of Northumberland, was imprisoned in 1605 in connection with the Gunpowder Plot as he was closely connected to one of the conspirators, Thomas Percy. Harriot himself was interrogated and briefly imprisoned but was soon released. Walter Warner, Robert Hues, William Lower, and other scientists were present around the Earl of Northumberland's mansion as they worked for him and assisted in the teaching of the family's children.

While this was occurring, Harriot continued his work involving mainly astronomy, and in 1607 Harriot used his notes from the observations of Halley's Comet from Ilfracombe to elaborate on his understanding of its orbit. Soon after, in 1609 and 1610 respectively, Harriot turned his attention towards the physical aspects of the Moon and his observations of the first sightings of sunspots.

In early 1609, he bought a "Dutch trunke" (telescope), invented in 1608, and his observations were among the first uses of a telescope for astronomy. Harriot is now credited as the first astronomer to draw an astronomical object after viewing it through a telescope: he drew a map of the Moon on 5 August 1609 [O.S. 26 July 1609], preceding Galileo by several months. By 1613, Harriot had created two maps of the whole Moon, with many identifiable features such as lunar craters depicted in their correct relative positions that were not to be improved upon for several decades. He also observed sunspots in December 1610.

=== Death ===
From 1614 Harriot was consulting Théodore de Mayerne, who was among James I's doctors, for an apparent cancer of the left nostril that was gradually eating away the septum and was apparently linked to a cancerous ulcer on his lip. This progressed until 1621, when he was living with a friend named Thomas Buckner on Threadneedle Street. There he died, apparently from skin cancer. It was suspected that Harriot's cancer was due to excessive tobacco consumption.

He died on 2 July 1621, three days after writing his will (discovered by Henry Stevens). His executors posthumously published his Artis Analyticae Praxis on algebra in 1631; Nathaniel Torporley was the intended executor of Harriot's wishes, but Walter Warner in the end pulled the book into shape. It may be a compendium of some of his works but does not represent all that he left unpublished (more than 400 sheets of annotated writing). It is not directed in a way that follows the manuscripts and it fails to give the full significance of Harriot's writings.

Thomas Harriot was buried in the church of St Christopher le Stocks in Threadneedle Street, near where he died. The church was subsequently damaged in the Great Fire of London, and demolished in 1781 to enable expansion of the Bank of England.

=== Telescope and Moon mapping ===
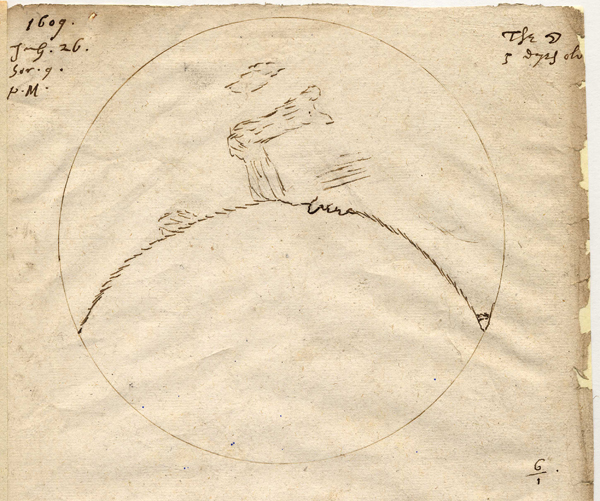
Harriot's illustration of the Moon from 1609.

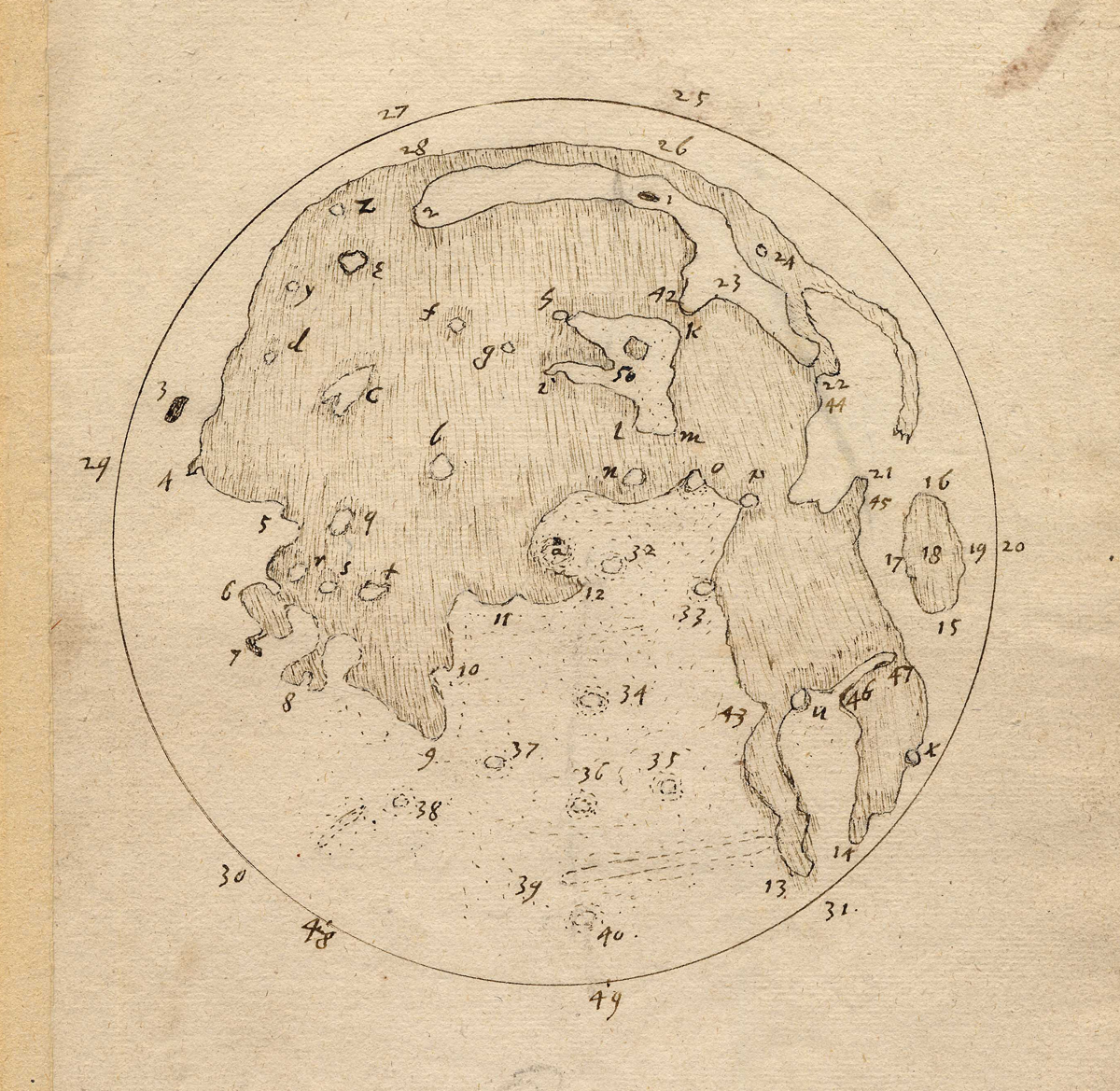
Harriot's map of the moon from late 1610.

Harriot's 5 August [O.S. 26 July] 1609 drawing of his observation of the Moon has been noted as the first recorded telescopic observation ever made, predating Galileo Galilei's 30 November 1609 observation by almost four months. Galileo's drawings, which were the first such observations to be published, contained greater detail such as identifying previously unknown features including mountains and craters. In a late 1610 drawing Harriot inaccurately drew how far the crescent Moon would be illuminated around its limb, inaccurately drew the position of the craters, and did not draw the relief details that one would see along the Moon's light/dark terminator. Critics, such as Terrie Bloom, accused Harriot of plagiarizing depictions directly from Galileo's works and argued that Harriot's representation of the Moon was an inadequate representation that needed to be improved. However, both descriptions were also deemed valuable due to the scientists focusing on different specific observations. Galileo describes the arrangement in a topographical way while Harriot used cartographical concepts to illustrate his views of the Moon. Harriot used a 6X Dutch telescope for his observations of the Moon. Harriot's recordings and descriptions were very simple with minimal detail causing his sketches to be difficult to analyze by later scientists. Galileo's astronomical observations regarding the Moon were published in his book Sidereus Nuncius in 1610 and Harriot's observations were published in 1784 with some not coming to light until 1965. Harriot's lack of publication is presumed to be connected to the issues with the Ninth Earl of Northumberland and the Gunpowder Plot. Harriot was also known to have read and admired the work of Galileo in Sidereus Nuncius. Harriot continued his observations of the Moon until 1612.

== Sunspots ==
Thomas Harriot is recognized as the first person to observe sunspots in 1610 with the use of a telescope. Harriot observed the sunspot with the use of a telescope in a direct and hazardous way. Even though Harriot observed the Sun directly through his telescope, there were no recorded injuries to his eyes. Harriot's depiction of the sunspots were documented in 199 drawings that provided details about the solar rotation and its acceleration. Like many of Harriot's other notes, depictions of the sunspots were not published. Similar to the early observation of the Moon, Galileo was also known to contribute his observations of sunspots and published his findings in 1613. The specifics as to how Harriot's telescope was set up remains largely unknown. However, it is known that Harriot used different magnifications of telescopes with 10X and 20X power being used most often. Harriot chose to observe the sunspots after sunrise because it made the vertical easier to analyze. According to Harriot's notes there was a total of 690 observations of sunspots recorded. Harriot's findings challenged the idea of the unchanging heavens by explaining the Sun's axial rotation and provided further support for the heliocentric theory.

== Compounding ==
Around 1620, Harriot's unpublished papers include the early basis of continuous compounding. Harriot uses modern mathematical concepts to explain the process behind continuous compounding. The concept of compounded interest occurs when the more times interest is added within the year assuming the rate stays the same then the final interest will be larger. Based on this observation, Harriot created mathematical equations that included logarithms and series calculations to illustrate his concepts.

== Legacy ==
Harriott also studied optics and refraction, and discovered Snell's law 20 years before Snellius did; like so many of his works, this remained unpublished. In Virginia he learned the local Algonquian language, which may have had some effect on his mathematical thinking. He founded the "English school" of algebra. Around 1600, he introduced an algebraic symbolism close to modern notation; thus, computation with unknowns became as easy as with numbers. He is also credited with discovering Girard's theorem, although the formula bears Girard's name as he was the first to publish it.

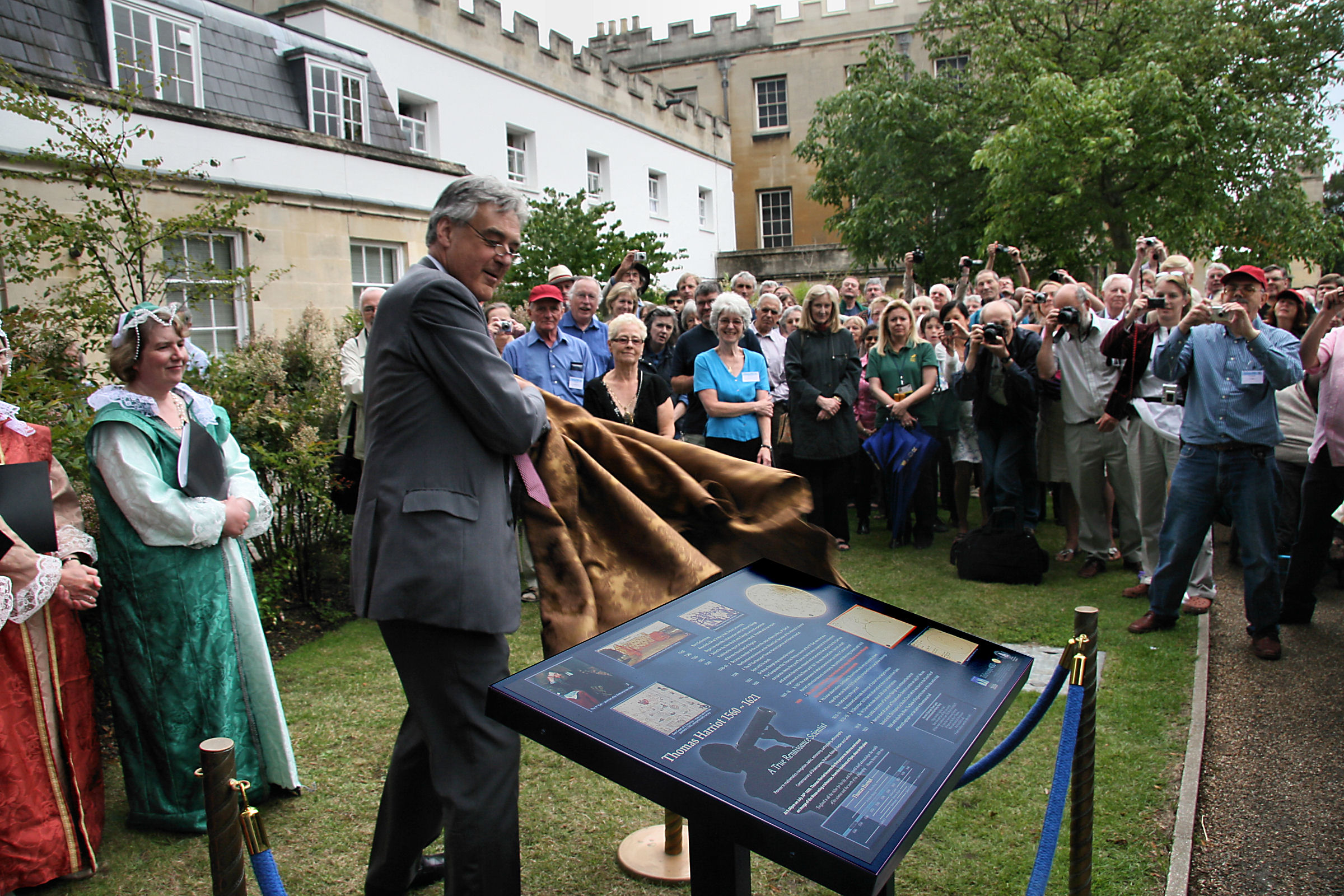
Lord Egremont unveils a plaque commemorating Thomas Harriot at Syon House, West London (July 2009)

His algebra book Artis Analyticae Praxis (1631) was published posthumously in Latin by his friend and executor Walter Warner. Unfortunately, the editors did not understand much of his reasoning and removed the parts they did not comprehend such as the negative and complex roots of equations. Because of the dispersion of Harriot's writings the full annotated English translation of the Praxis was not completed until 2007. A more complete manuscript, De numeris triangularibus et inde de progressionibus arithmeticis: Magisteria magna, was finally published in facsimile form with commentary by Janet Beery and Jackie Stedall in 2009. Harriot introduced innovations such as symbolic algebra and mathematical notation: he is credited with the first widespread use of the inequality signs "<" and ">". The first biography of Harriot was written in 1876 by Henry Stevens of Vermont but not published until 1900 fourteen years after his death. The publication was limited to 167 copies and so the work was not widely known until 1972 when a reprint edition appeared. Prominent American poet, novelist and biographer Muriel Rukeyser wrote an extended literary inquiry into the life and significance of Hariot (her preferred spelling), The Traces of Thomas Hariot (1970, 1971). Interest in Harriot continued to revive with the convening of a symposium at the University of Delaware in April 1971 with the proceedings published by the Oxford University Press in 1974. John W. Shirley the editor (1908–1988) went on to publish A Sourcebook for the Study of Thomas Harriot and his Harriot biography (1983). The papers of John Shirley are held in Special Collections at the University of Delaware.

Harriot's accomplishments remain relatively obscure because he did not publish any of his results and also because many of his manuscripts have been lost; those that survive are in the British Museum and in the archives of the Percy family at Petworth House (Sussex) and Alnwick Castle (Northumberland). He was frequently accused of being an atheist, and it has been suggested that he deliberately refrained from publishing for fear of intensifying such attacks; as the literary historian Stephen Greenblatt writes "... he preferred life to fame. And who can blame him?"

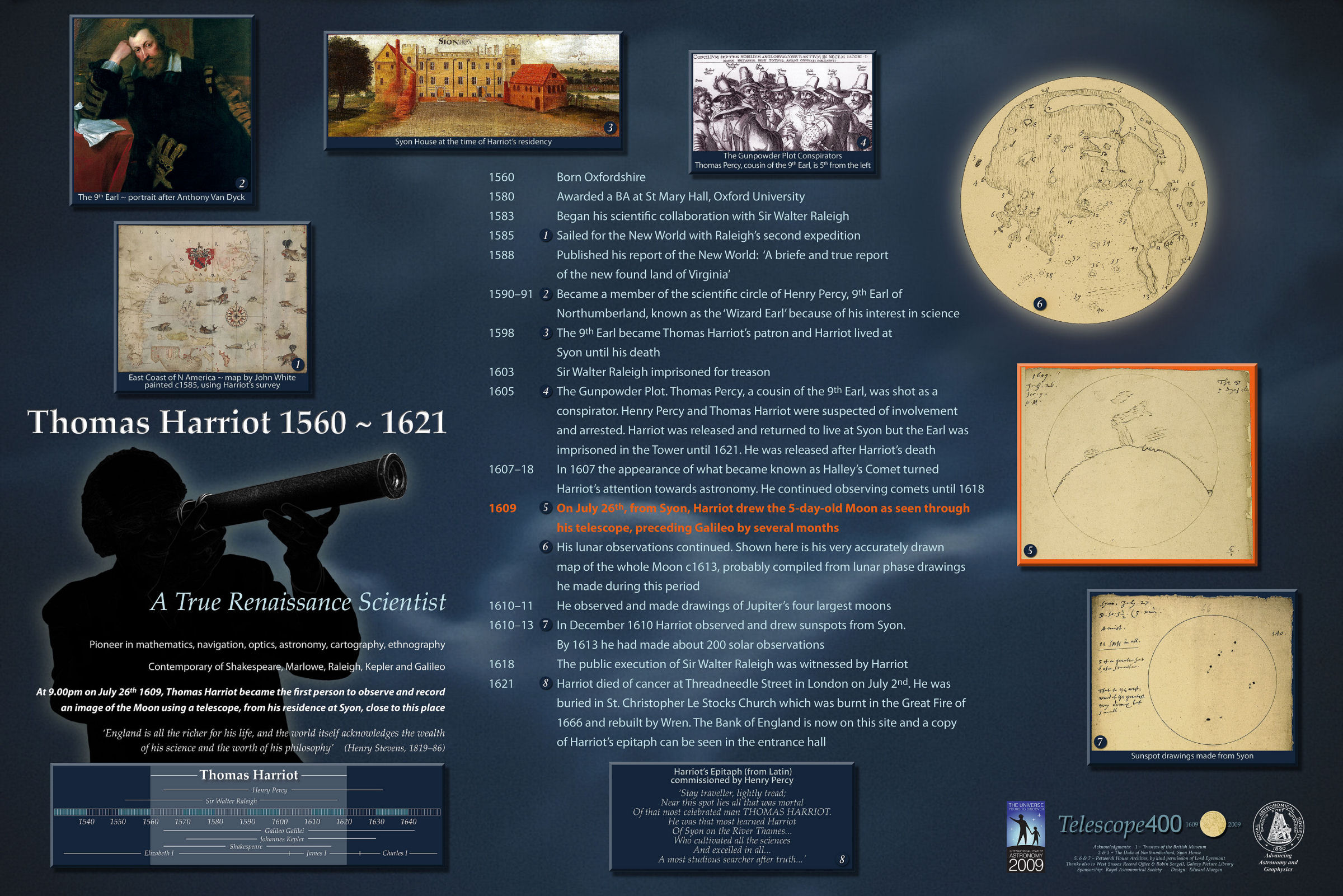
The Thomas Harriot plaque in the grounds of Syon House (W. London).

An event was held at Syon House, West London, to celebrate the 400th anniversary of Harriot's first observations of the Moon on 26 July 2009. This event, Telescope400, included the unveiling of a plaque to commemorate Harriot by Lord Egremont. The plaque can now be seen by visitors to Syon House, the location of Harriot's historic observations. His drawing made 400 years earlier is believed to be based on the first observations of the Moon through a telescope. The event (sponsored by the Royal Astronomical Society) was run as part of the International Year of Astronomy (IYA).

The observatory in the campus of the College of William & Mary is named in Harriot's honor. A crater on the Moon was named after him in 1970; it is on the Moon's far side and hence unobservable from Earth.

In July 2014 the International Astronomical Union launched NameExoWorlds, a process for giving proper names to certain exoplanets and their host stars. The process involved public nomination and voting for the new names. In December 2015, the IAU announced the winning name was Harriot for the exoplanet 55 Cancri Af. The winning name was submitted by the Royal Netherlands Association for Meteorology and Astronomy of the Netherlands. It honors the astronomer.

The Thomas Harriot College of Arts and Sciences at East Carolina University in Greenville, NC is named in recognition of this Harriot's scientific contributions to the New World such as his work A Briefe and True Report of the New Found Land of Virginia.

== See also ==
- The School of Night

== Sources ==
- Boyle, Rebecca (2024). Our Moon: A Human History. Sceptre. ISBN 9781529342789.
- Kupperman, Karen Ordahl (2000). Indians and English: Facing Off in Early America. Ithaca: Cornell University Press. ISBN 0801482828.
- Mancall, Peter C. (2007). Hakluyt's Promise: An Elizabethan's Obsession for an English America. New Haven: Yale University Press. ISBN 9780300164220.
- Milton, Giles (2000). Big Chief Elizabeth – How England's Adventurers Gambled and Won the New World'. London: Hodder & Stoughton. ISBN 9780312420185.
- Rukeyser, Muriel (1971). The Traces of Thomas Hariot. NY: Random House.
- Vaughan, Alden T. (2002). "Sir Walter Ralegh's Indian Interpreters, 1584–1618". The William and Mary Quarterly. 59 (2): 341–376. doi:10.2307/3491741. ISSN 0043-5597. JSTOR 3491741.
