= Mohamed Omar (mathematician) =

Canadian mathematician

- Born: Alexandria, Egypt
- Education: University of Waterloo, University of California Davis
- Awards: Mathematical Association of America Henry L. Alder Award (2018) Karen EDGE Fellow (2020)
- Scientific career
- Fields: Mathematics, combinatorics, algebra
- Workplaces: York University
- Doctoral advisor: Jesús A. De Loera

Mohamed Omar is a mathematician interested in combinatorics, and algebra. Omar is currently a Professor of Mathematics at York University.

== Early life and education ==
Omar was born in Alexandria, Egypt to an Egyptian mother and an Ethiopian father, but was raised in Toronto, Canada.

He attended the University of Waterloo, where he received a bachelor's double degree in pure mathematics and combinatorics & optimization in 2006, followed by a master's degree in combinatorics & optimization in 2007. Omar's master's thesis was titled "Combinatorial Approaches to the Jacobian Conjecture" and was advised by Ian P. Goulden.

Omar then attended graduate school in the mathematics department at the University of California Davis. He completed his Ph.D. in mathematics in 2011. Omar's doctoral advisor was Jesús A. De Loera, and his dissertation was titled "Applications of Convex and Algebraic Geometry to Graphs and Polytopes".

== Career ==
After completion of his doctorate, Omar became the Harry Bateman Research Instructor at the California Institute of Technology. In the fall of 2013 Omar moved to Harvey Mudd College and took a position as tenure track faculty in the mathematics department. In 2023, Omar then moved to York University as a professor in the Department of Mathematics and Statistics.

Beyond the classroom, Omar has been involved in numerous outreach efforts to promote diversity in Science, Technology, Engineering and Mathematics (STEM) fields, as well as mathematical enrichment for high school students. He has participated in the Bridge to Enter Advanced Mathematics (BEAM) program as an instructor. Omar has also served as faculty at the Canada/USA Mathcamp, and eventually served on the board of directors for the Mathematics Foundation of America, which organizes the camp.

Omar's work in promoting diversity has been written about in Forbes Magazine, and he has been a guest on the Scientific American podcast "My Favorite Theorem". He also maintains a YouTube channel where he posts videos about advanced mathematical concepts as well as videos aimed at helping young students prepare for standardized tests.

== Honors and awards ==
Omar has received several awards for the quality of his teaching. In the 2013–2014 academic year, he was awarded the Associated Students of the California Institute of Technology (ASCIT) Teaching Award. In 2018, the Mathematical Association of America awarded him the Henry L. Alder Award. In 2020, Omar was selected as a fellow in the 2020 Inaugural Class of Karen EDGE Fellows. Omar was also recognized by Mathematically Gifted & Black as a Black History Month 2017 Honoree. He was awarded the Inaugural AMS Claytor-Gilmer Fellowship in 2021.
