= Susan D'Agostino =

American mathematician and science writer

Susan E. D'Agostino is an American mathematician and science writer, an associate editor at the Bulletin of the Atomic Scientists, and the author of the book How to Free Your Inner Mathematician: Notes on Mathematics and Life (2020).

== Education and career ==
D'Agostino grew up in New York City. After dropping calculus in high school, she majored in anthropology at Bard College, while working on a dairy farm. At age 25, she set herself a task of earning a mathematics doctorate, beginning with the remedial mathematics missing from her high school education. With the encouragement of mathematician James Henle, she earned a master's degree in mathematics education at Smith College, and then completed her doctorate at Dartmouth College in 2003, with a dissertation in coding theory supervised by Thomas R. Shemanske. While a student, she interviewed coding theory pioneer Vera Pless, and won first place in an essay-writing contest of the Association for Women in Mathematics.

Although not originally intending to go on in academia, she took a position as a faculty member at Southern New Hampshire University, the first person hired there with a mathematics Ph.D. She worked there for nearly ten years, earning tenure and receiving the university's excellence in teaching award. After the university, formerly a regional teaching school, reinvented itself as an online education provider with a massively increased enrollment, she decided to leave academia, becoming a science writer instead.

In 2018, she was named as a recipient of a Taylor/Blakeslee University Fellowship for graduate study in science writing, from the Council for the Advancement of Science Writing, and by 2020, she was studying for a master's degree in science writing from Johns Hopkins University. She completed it in 2021, and in the same year became an associate editor for the Bulletin of the Atomic Scientists. She also has a Master of Fine Arts in nonfiction writing from Southern New Hampshire University.

== Writing ==
D'Agostino has written for "The Atlantic, The Washington Post, Wired, Scientific American, Quanta, BBC Science Focus, Nature, Financial Times, Undark, Atlas Obscura, Discover, Slate, Literary Hub, and the Chronicle of Higher Education, among others".

She is the author of the book How to Free Your Inner Mathematician: Notes on Mathematics and Life (2020). The book received the 2023 Euler Book Prize of the Mathematical Association of America. She was also editor-in-chief of a book about the EDGE program for women in mathematics, A Celebration of the EDGE Program's Impact on the Mathematics Community and Beyond (2019).
