= Betsy Stovall =

American mathematician

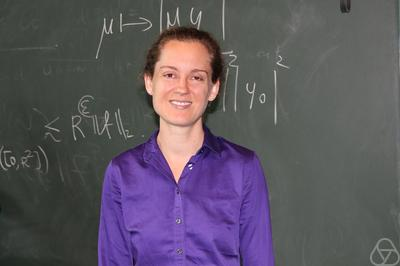
Stovall at Oberwolfach in 2017

Lindsay Elizabeth "Betsy" Stovall is an American mathematician known for her research in harmonic analysis. She is the Mary Herman Rubinstein Professor in the College of Letters & Science at the University of Wisconsin–Madison.

== Education and career ==
Stovall is a graduate of Emory University, and received her PhD in 2009 from University of California, Berkeley, where her advisor was F. Michael Christ. Before joining the University of Wisconsin in 2012, she was associate adjunct professor at the University of California, Los Angeles.

She is the Associate Secretary for the Central Section of the American Mathematical Society, with a term beginning in February 2022.

Stovall was a member of the American Mathematical Society (AMS) Abstracts Editorial Committee from 2022 - 2023.

== Recognition ==
Stovall was named to the 2023 class of Fellows of the American Mathematical Society, "for contributions to harmonic analysis". In 2026, she received the AWM Service Award "for spearheading the local organizing efforts to create a spectacular 2025 AWM Research Symposium in Madison."
