= Emille D. Lawrence =

American mathematician

- Education: Spelman College and University of Georgia
- Awards: AWM Service Award; Fellow of the Association for Women in Mathematics (2024); Karen EDGE Fellow (2021)
- Scientific career
- Fields: Mathematics
- Workplaces: University of San Francisco
- Thesis: Characterizing Right-Veering Homeomorphisms of the Punctured Torus via the Burau Representation (2007)
- Doctoral advisor: Clint McCrory and Will Kazez

Emille Davie Lawrence is a mathematician specializing in topological graph theory. She is Term Associate Professor and Chair of Mathematics and Statistics at the University of San Francisco.

== Education and career ==
Lawrence received her BS in Mathematics from Spelman College and her PhD in Mathematics from the University of Georgia in 2007. Her dissertation was jointly supervised by Clint McCrory and Will Kazez. She is a low-dimensional topologist with mathematical interests that include braid groups, geometric group theory, and spatial graphs. She is also an advocate for broadening participation in the mathematical sciences through outreach and mentoring. She is Editor-In-Chief for the American Mathematical Society's blog Math Mamas.

== Awards and honors ==
In 2021, Lawrence received the Association for Women in Mathematics (AWM) Service Award "for her service as Chair of the 50th Anniversary Committee and her leadership role as Chair, since 2016, of the Mentor Network Committee and for her mentorship as Founding Faculty Sponsor of the AWM Student Chapter at the University of San Francisco. In all of these roles, Emille has worked to increase participation in the AWM by a diverse population of mathematicians at all stages of their careers."

In 2021, Lawrence was awarded a Karen Edge Fellowship and was featured on the AWM website Women Do Math. In 2024, she was selected as a fellow of the Association for Women in Mathematics.
