= Ulrica Wilson =

American mathematician

Ulrica Wilson is an American mathematician specializing in the theory of noncommutative rings and in the combinatorics of matrices. She is an associate professor at Morehouse College, associate director of diversity and outreach at the Institute for Computational and Experimental Research in Mathematics (ICERM), and a former vice president of the National Association of Mathematicians.

== Education and career ==
Wilson is African-American, and originally from Massachusetts, but grew up in Birmingham, Alabama. She is a 1992 graduate of Spelman College, and completed her Ph.D. at Emory University in 2004. Her dissertation, Cyclicity of Division Algebras over an Arithmetically Nice Field, was supervised by Eric Brussel.

Wilson has contributed to the advancement of black women, women of color, and women in general in the field of mathematical sciences through the program EDGE Enhancing Diversity in Graduate Education, which is a program that helps minorities with support in order to achieve academic goals and obtain Doctoral Degrees.

After two stints as a postdoctoral researcher, she joined the Morehouse College faculty in 2007, and became associate director at ICERM in 2013. She serves on the Education Advisory Board for ICERM.

In collaboration with ICERM, Wilson is also co-director of the REUF program, The Research Experience for Undergraduate Faculty, this program was founded under the American Institute of Mathematics (AIM) to provide undergraduate faculty a community of scholars that support exchange and expand research ideas and projects to engage in with undergraduate students.

== The EDGE Program ==
In 2011, Wilson became Co-Director of the EDGE Program, a program to mentor, train, and support the academic development and research activities of women in mathematics. The program was designed to focus on training and creating jobs in mathematical sciences for women, especially those from underrepresented groups. The EDGE program helped increase the number of women, especially in minority groups, to take over in academia, industry and government roles. The EDGE program first began offering summer sessions to equip women in research providing annual conferences, mini-research, and collaborations with prestigious universities. The EDGE program has since expanded and its activities are centered on providing ongoing support for women toward the academic development and research productivity of women at several critical stages of their careers. EDGE focuses on women at 4 career stages—entering graduate students, advanced graduate students, postdoctoral students, and early career researchers. Since Wilson became Co-Director, over 50 women participated in various EDGE program activities and 18 EDGE participants received their PhDs. Numerous women have been granted sabbatical support and one woman was even able to use her mini-sabbatical to continue and build her research with a senior mathematician at Purdue University.

== Recognition ==
In 2003, Wilson was awarded the Marshall Hall Award from Emory College of Arts and Sciences in recognition of excellent performance while teaching and outstanding research as a doctoral student.

Wilson was the Morehouse College Vulcan Teaching Excellence Award winner for 2016–2017. She was recognized by Mathematically Gifted & Black as a Black History Month 2017 Honoree. In 2018, she won the Presidential Award for Excellence in Science, Mathematics, and Engineering Mentoring. She is on the Board of directors of Enhancing Diversity in Graduate Education (EDGE), a program that helps women entering graduate studies in the mathematical sciences. She was included in the 2019 class of fellows of the Association for Women in Mathematics " for her many years of supporting the professional development of women in their pursuit of graduate degrees in mathematics, most visibly through mentoring, teaching and program administration within the EDGE Program, and also as associate director of diversity and outreach at The Institute for Computational and Experimental Research in Mathematics (ICERM)". She was awarded the 2023 Award for Impact on the Teaching and Learning of Mathematics from the AMS for her "many initiatives on the teaching and learning of mathematics for many different segments of the mathematics community."
