= Shmuel Onn =

Israeli mathematician

- שמואל און
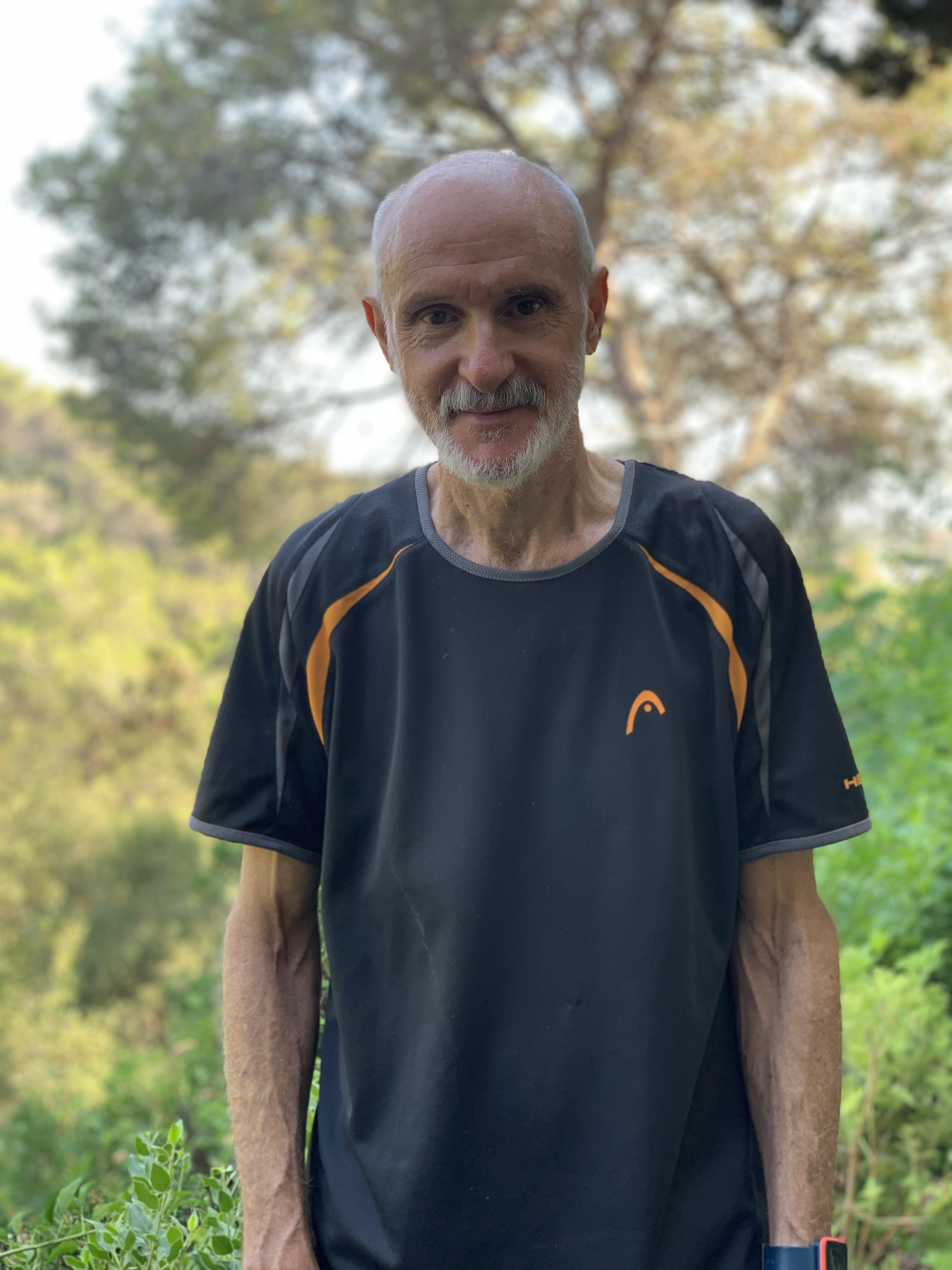
- Born: 1960 (age 65–66); Israel
- Education: Technion; Cornell University
- Spouse: Ruth
- Children: Amos and Naomi
- Scientific career
- Fields: Operations research, Mathematics
- Workplaces: Technion
- Thesis: Discrete Geometry, Group Representations and Combinatorial Optimization: an Interplay (1992)
- Doctoral advisor: Louis J. Billera, Bernd Sturmfels, Leslie E. Trotter Jr.

Shmuel Onn (Hebrew: שמואל און; born 1960) is a mathematician, Professor of Operations Research and Dresner Chair at the Technion - Israel Institute of Technology. He is known for his contributions to integer programming and nonlinear combinatorial optimization.

== Education ==
Shmuel Onn did his high school education in Kadoorie Agricultural High School. He received his B.Sc. (Cum Laude) in Electrical Engineering from Technion in 1980, and following his obligatory service in the Navy, received his M.Sc. from Technion in 1987. Onn obtained his Ph.D. in operations research from Cornell University, with minors in applied mathematics and computer science, in 1992. His thesis, "Discrete Geometry, Group Representations and Combinatorial Optimization: an Interplay", was advised by Louis J. Billera, Bernd Sturmfels, and Leslie E. Trotter Jr.

During 1992–1993 he was a postdoctoral fellow at DIMACS, and during 1993-1994 he was an Alexander von Humboldt postdoctoral fellow at the University of Passau, Germany.

== Career ==
In 1994 Onn joined the Faculty of Data and Decision Sciences of Technion, where he is currently professor and Dresner Chair. He was also a Visiting Professor and Nachdiplom Lecturer at the Institute for Mathematical Research, ETH Zürich in 2009, and visiting professor at the Mathematics Department in the University of California, Davis (2001-2002). Professor Onn has been also a long-term visitor at various mathematical research institutes including Mittag-Leffler in Stockholm, MSRI in Berkeley, and Oberwolfach in Germany. He also served as associate editor for Mathematics of Operations Research in 2010–2016 and associate editor for Discrete Optimization in 2004–2010.

Onn advised several students and postdoctoral researchers who proceeded to pursue academic careers, including Antoine Deza, Sharon Aviran, Tal Raviv, Nir Halman, and Martin Koutecký.

== Research ==
Shmuel Onn is known for his contributions to integer programming and nonlinear combinatorial optimization. In particular, he developed an algorithmic theory of linear and nonlinear integer programming in variable dimension using Graver bases. This work introduced the theory of block-structured and n-fold integer programming, and the broader theory of sparse and bounded tree-depth integer programming, shown to be fixed-parameter tractable. These theories were followed up by other authors, and have applications in a variety of areas.

Some other contributions of Onn include a framework that uses edge-directions for solving convex multi-criteria combinatorial optimization problems and its applications, a universality theorem showing that every integer program is one over slim three-dimensional tables, the settling of the complexity of hypergraph degree sequences, and the introduction of colorful linear programming.

== Honors and awards ==
- 2010, INFORMS Computing Society (ICS) Prize.
- 2009, Nachdiplom Lecturer, Institute for Mathematical Research, ETH Zürich.

== Books ==
- Nonlinear discrete optimization: An algorithmic theory. Zurich Lectures in Advanced Mathematics. European Mathematical Society (EMS), Zürich, 2010.

== Personal life ==
Shmuel is married to Ruth. They have two children, Amos and Naomi, and live in Haifa.
