= Tamara G. Kolda =

American applied mathematician

- Education: University of Maryland Baltimore County; University of Maryland College Park
- Awards: ACM Fellow (2019); Presidential Early Career Award for Scientists and Engineers (2003)
- Scientific career
- Fields: Applied mathematics Computational science
- Workplaces: Oak Ridge National Laboratory; Sandia National Laboratories
- Thesis: Limited-Memory Matrix Methods With Applications (1997)
- Doctoral advisor: Dianne P. O'Leary

Tamara G. Kolda is an American applied mathematician and former Distinguished Member of Technical Staff at Sandia National Laboratories. She is noted for her contributions in computational science, multilinear algebra, data mining, graph algorithms, mathematical optimization, parallel computing, and software engineering.

== Education ==
Kolda received her bachelor's degree in mathematics in 1992 from the University of Maryland Baltimore County and her PhD in applied mathematics from the University of Maryland College Park in 1997.

== Career and research ==
Kolda was a Householder Postdoctoral Fellow at Oak Ridge National Laboratory from 1997 to 1999 before joining Sandia National Laboratories.

=== Awards and honors ===
Kolda received a Presidential Early Career Award for Scientists and Engineers in 2003, best paper prizes at the 2008 IEEE International Conference on Data Mining and the 2013 SIAM International Conference on Data Mining, and has been a distinguished member of the Association for Computing Machinery since 2011. She was elected a Fellow of the Society for Industrial and Applied Mathematics in 2015. She was elected a Fellow of the Association for Computing Machinery in 2019 for "innovations in algorithms for tensor decompositions, contributions to data science, and community leadership." She was elected to the National Academy of Engineering in 2020, for "contributions to the design of scientific software, including tensor decompositions and multilinear algebra".

== Publications ==
=== Books ===
1. Ballard, Grey; Kolda, Tamara G. (2025). Tensor Decompositions for Data Science. Cambridge University Press. doi:10.1017/9781009471664. ISBN 978-1-009-47167-1.
2. Kolda, Tamara G. (2024). Unlocking LaTeX Graphics: A Concise Guide to TikZ and PGFPLOTS.

=== Selected publications ===
Tensor decomposition and algorithms

- Jin, Ruhui; Kileel, Joe; Kolda, Tamara G.; Ward, Rachel (2024). "Scalable Symmetric Tucker Tensor Decomposition". SIAM Journal on Matrix Analysis and Applications. 45 (4): 1746–1781. arXiv:2204.10824. doi:10.1137/23M1582928.
- Ward, Rachel; Kolda, Tamara G. (2023). "Convergence of Alternating Gradient Descent for Matrix Factorization". Advances in Neural Information Processing Systems 36 (NeurIPS 2023). arXiv:2305.06927.
- Phipps, Eric T.; Johnson, Nicholas T.; Kolda, Tamara G. (2023). "Streaming Generalized Canonical Polyadic Tensor Decompositions". Proceedings of Platform for Advanced Scientific Computing (PASC'23) Conference. ACM. doi:10.1145/3592979.3593405.
- Larsen, Brett W.; Kolda, Tamara G.; Zhang, Anru R.; Williams, Alex H. (2024). "Tensor Decomposition Meets RKHS: Efficient Algorithms for Smooth and Misaligned Data". arXiv:2408.05677 [math.NA].
- Brown, Gabriel H.; Kileel, Joe; Kolda, Tamara G. (2025). "The Fascinating World of 2 × 2 × 2 Tensors: Its Geometry and Optimization Challenges". arXiv:2504.03937 [math.NA].

Educational and expository writing

- Kolda, Tamara G.; Caflisch, Russel E.; Fonseca, Irene; Fuentes, Montserrat; Garibaldi, Ryan; Grandine, Tom; Jackson, Trachette; Meng, Xiao-Li; Pipher, Jill; Tao, Terence (2023). "Illustrating the Impact of the Mathematical Sciences (Poster Series)". National Academies.
- Klinvex, Alicia; Kolda, Tamara (2023). "Automating Conference Scheduling with Genetic Algorithms at CSE23 and Beyond". SIAM News. 56 (9).
