= Victoria Howle =

American mathematician

- Occupation: Professor
- Known for: Trilinos

Academic background
- Education: Cornell University

Academic work
- Discipline: Applied mathematics
- Sub-discipline: Numerical linear algebra
- Institutions: Texas Tech University
- Doctoral students: Pavithra Venkatachalapathy

Victoria E. Howle is an American applied mathematician specializing in numerical linear algebra. She is known as one of the developers of the Trilinos open-source software library for scientific computing. She is a full professor in the Department of Mathematics and Statistics at Texas Tech University.

== Education and career ==
Howle graduated from Rutgers University in 1988 with a bachelor's degree in English literature. She earned her Ph.D. in 2001 from Cornell University. Her dissertation, Efficient Iterative Methods for Ill-Conditioned Linear and Nonlinear Network Problems, was supervised by Stephen Vavasis.

After working as a researcher at Sandia National Laboratories from 2000 to 2007, she took a faculty position at Texas Tech in 2007.

== Service and recognition ==
Howle was one of the inaugural winners of the AWM Service Award of the Association for Women in Mathematics in 2013. The award honored her service to the association, including founding its annual essay contest in which students write biographies of contemporary women mathematicians.
