= Rebecca A. Herb =

American mathematician

- Occupation: Professor Emerita at the University of Maryland

Academic background
- Education: University of Washington

Academic work
- Discipline: Mathematician
- Sub-discipline: Abstract algebra
- Institutions: University of Maryland

Rebecca A. Herb (born 1948) is an American mathematician and professor emerita at the University of Maryland. Her research involves abstract algebra and Lie groups.

In 2012, Herb became one of the inaugural fellows of the American Mathematical Society. In 2013, she was one of ten recipients of the first Service Awards of the Association for Women in Mathematics “for her service as AWM Treasurer (2004–2012), and her help during AWM’s transition from its headquarters at the University of Maryland to the management company STAT.”

Herb earned her Ph.D. in 1974 from the University of Washington under the supervision of Garth William Warner, Jr. From 2004 until 2012 (when she was succeeded by Ellen Kirkman), Herb was treasurer of the Association for Women in Mathematics.

Herb was an American Mathematical Society (AMS) Council Member at Large from 1993 to 1994.
