= Dorina Mitrea =

Romanian-American mathematician

Dorina Irena-Rita Mitrea (born April 30, 1965) is a Romanian-American mathematician known for her work in harmonic analysis, partial differential equations, and the theory of distributions, and in mathematics education. She is a professor of mathematics and former chair of the mathematics department at Baylor University.

== Education and career ==
Mitrea earned a master's degree in 1987 from the University of Bucharest. Her thesis, Riemann’s Theorem for Simply Connected Riemann Surfaces, was supervised by Cabiria Andreian Cazacu. She completed her doctorate in 1996 from the University of Minnesota. Her dissertation, Layer Potential Operators and Boundary Value Problems for Differential Forms on Lipschitz Domains, was supervised by Eugene Barry Fabes.

Mitrea joined the University of Missouri mathematics faculty in 1996, and became M. & R. Houchins Distinguished Professor of Mathematics at the University of Missouri in 2016. She moved to Baylor as professor and chair in 2019.

== Books ==
Mitrea is the author of:

- Layer Potentials, the Hodge Laplacian, and Global Boundary Problems in Nonsmooth Riemannian Manifolds (with Marius Mitrea and Michael E. Taylor, Memoirs of the American Mathematical Society, 2001)
- Calculus Connections: Mathematics for Middle School Teachers (with Asma Harcharras, Pearson Prentice Hall, 2007)
- Distributions, Partial Differential Equations, and Harmonic Analysis (Universitext, Springer, 2013; 2nd ed., 2018)
- Groupoid Metrization Theory: With Applications to Analysis on Quasi-Metric Spaces and Functional Analysis (with Irina Mitrea, Marius Mitrea, and Sylvie Monniaux, Birkhäuser, 2013)
- The Hodge-Laplacian: Boundary Value Problems on Riemannian Manifolds (with Irina Mitrea, Marius Mitrea, and Michael E. Taylor, De Gruyter, 2016)
- $L^p$-Square Function Estimates on Spaces of Homogeneous Type and on Uniformly Rectifiable Sets (with Steve Hofmann, Marius Mitrea, and Andrew J. Morris, Memoirs of the American Mathematical Society, 2017)
- Singular Integral Operators, Quantitative Flatness, and Boundary Problems (with Juan José Marín, José María Martell, Irina Mitrea, and Marius Mitrea, Progress in Mathematics, 344, Birkhäuser, 2022)
- Geometric Harmonic Analysis I: A Sharp Divergence Theorem with Nontangential Pointwise Traces (with Irina Mitrea and Marius Mitrea, Developments in Mathematics 72, Springer, 2022. ISBN 978-3031059490)
- Geometric Harmonic Analysis II: Function Spaces Measuring Size and Smoothness on Rough Sets (with Irina Mitrea and Marius Mitrea, Developments in Mathematics 73, Springer, 2022. ISBN 978-3031137174)
- Geometric Harmonic Analysis III: Integral Representations, Calderón-Zygmund Theory, Fatou Theorems, and Applications to Scattering (with Irina Mitrea and Marius Mitrea, Developments in Mathematics 74, Springer, 2023. ISBN 978-3-031-22737-0, doi:10.1007/978-3-031-22735-6)
- Geometric Harmonic Analysis IV: Boundary Layer Potentials on Uniformly Rectifiable Domains, and Applications to Complex Analysis (with Irina Mitrea and Marius Mitrea, Developments in Mathematics 75, Springer, 2023. ISBN 978-3031291814)
- Geometric Harmonic Analysis V: Fredholm Theory and Finer Estimates for Integral Operators, with Applications to Boundary Problems (with Irina Mitrea and Marius Mitrea, Developments in Mathematics 76, Springer, 2023.ISBN 978-3031315602)

== Recognition ==
Mitrea was elected as a Fellow of the American Mathematical Society in the 2024 class of fellows.

== Personal life ==
She is married to Marius Mitrea. Her husband is also a mathematician, and moved with Mitrea from Missouri to Baylor.
