= The History of Mathematics: A Very Short Introduction =

2012 book by Jackie Stedall

- First edition
- Author: Jackie Stedall
- Language: English
- Series: Very Short Introductions
- Genre: Non-fiction
- Publisher: Oxford University Press
- Publication date: 2012

The History of Mathematics: A Very Short Introduction is a book on the history of mathematics. Rather than giving a systematic overview of the historical development of mathematics, it provides an introduction to how the discipline of the history of mathematics is studied and researched, through a sequence of case studies in historical topics. It was written by British historian of mathematics Jackie Stedall (1950–2014), and published in 2012 as part of the Oxford University Press Very Short Introductions series of books. It has been listed as essential for mathematics libraries, and won the Neumann Prize for books on the history of mathematics.

== Topics ==
The History of Mathematics consists of seven chapters, featuring many case studies. Its first, "Mathematics: myth and history", gives a case study of the history of Fermat's Last Theorem and of Wiles's proof of Fermat's Last Theorem, making a case that the proper understanding of this history should go beyond a chronicle of individual mathematicians and their accomplishments, and that mathematics has always been done as part of a cultural milieu rather than as an isolated activity in an ivory tower. The second chapter takes a wider view, using the Chinese Book on Numbers and Computation as one of its case studies; it asks which cultural accomplishments should be counted as mathematics, and who counted as mathematicians, making the point that these two questions are not the same. The third chapter covers the way that ancient mathematics has been passed down to present historians, the ways that documentary evidence has been destroyed over the years, and the ways that, when it has been preserved, it has been altered in transmission. A case study here is Euclid's Elements and its transmission through Mathematics in medieval Islam to Europe.

Chapter 4 concerns the ways in which mathematics has been taught and learned, beginning with the scribal schools of Babylon and including also the historical role of women in mathematics, and chapter 5 concerns the ways in which its practitioners have supported themselves. Chapter 6 provides another case study, of the Pythagorean theorem, the different ways in which it has been reinterpreted, or other pieces of mathematics reinterpreted in its light, and the ways in which historians have shifted their views on questions of who was first for results like this that have been found across multiple ancient cultures. Another point of both chapters 3 and 6 is the importance of understanding mathematical works within the view of their subject at the time, rather than reinterpreting them anachronistically into modern concepts of mathematics. A final chapter discusses the history of the history of mathematics, as a discipline.

== Audience and reception ==
The History of Mathematics is a quick read, largely avoids the use of formulas or other technical material, and is accessible to readers without significant background knowledge in this area. As well as being of general interest, it is suitable as reading material for courses in the history of mathematics, and informative for professional mathematicians and historians of mathematics as well as for students.

A rare negative opinion is provided by reviewer Franz Lemmermeyer, a German historian of number theory, who strongly disagrees with the book's philosophy of studying everyday work in mathematics instead of the achievements of great men, calling it "rewriting the history of mathematics in a politically corrected way". Nevertheless, Lemmermeyer writes that it "should be read by everyone interested in the history of mathematics".

The Basic Library List Committee of the Mathematical Association of America has listed The History of Mathematics as an essential book for all undergraduate mathematics libraries, and it won the 2013 Neumann Prize of the British Society for the History of Mathematics (named for Peter M. Neumann) for the best general-audience English-language book on the history of mathematics.
