= Maura Mast =

Irish American mathematician

Maura B. Mast

23rd President of Seattle University
- Incumbent
- Assumed office September 1, 2026
- Preceded by: Eduardo Peñalver

Personal details
- Education: University of Notre Dame (BA); University of North Carolina at Chapel Hill (PhD)
- Scientific career
- Known for: Differential geometry; quantitative reasoning; Common Sense Mathematics
- Awards: AWM Service Award (2017); AWM Fellow (2020)
- Fields: Mathematics; differential geometry; quantitative reasoning
- Workplaces: University of Northern Iowa; Northeastern University; Wellesley College; University of Massachusetts Boston; Fordham University, Seattle University
- Thesis: Closed Geodesics in 2-step Nilmanifolds (1992)
- Doctoral advisor: Pat Eberlein

Maura B. Mast is an Irish-American mathematician, mathematics educator, and academic administrator who is the 23rd and current president of Seattle University since 2026. Her research specialties are in differential geometry and quantitative reasoning. With Ethan D. Bolker, she is the author of the textbook Common Sense Mathematics.

== Early life and education ==
Mast is the daughter of Cecil B. Mast (1927–2008), a mathematics professor at the University of Notre Dame in South Bend, Indiana. Her mother was Irish, and Mast has dual Irish and American citizenship. She grew up in South Bend and did her undergraduate studies at Notre Dame, with a double major in mathematics and anthropology.

She completed her doctorate in mathematics in 1992 at the University of North Carolina at Chapel Hill. Her dissertation, Closed Geodesics in 2-step Nilmanifolds, concerned the differential geometry of geodesics on curved surfaces, and was supervised by Pat Eberlein.

== Career ==
Mast became a faculty member at the University of Northern Iowa in 1992. After visiting professorships at Northeastern University and Wellesley College, she moved to the University of Massachusetts Boston in 1998. There, in 2009, she became associate vice provost for undergraduate studies. In 2015, she came to Fordham University as the first female dean of Fordham College at Rose Hill. In 2022, she was promoted to the rank of full professor at Fordham University. In June 2026, she was named the 23rd president of Seattle University, becoming the first woman to serve in the role.

== Activism ==
Mast has been an active member of the Clavius Group, a group of Jesuit and lay mathematicians, and is a strong supporter of the Jesuit vision of Catholic spirituality.

She has also been a passionate advocate for the advancement of women in mathematics and science, which she writes is "crucial for the future of the country and for women". She has participated in the governance of the Association for Women in Mathematics as Clerk and Executive Committee member of the association.

Mast was chair of the Special Interest Group on Quantitative Literacy of the Mathematical Association of America for 2006–2007.

== Books ==
- Common Sense Mathematics (with Ethan D. Bolker, Mathematical Association of America, 2016)
- Women in Mathematics: Celebrating the Centennial of the Mathematical Association of America (edited with Janet Beery, Sarah J. Greenwald, and Jacqueline Jensen-Vallin, Springer, 2017)

== Recognition ==
In 2017 Mast was given the Association for Women in Mathematics Service Award. The Association for Women in Mathematics has included Mast in the 2020 class of AWM Fellows for "her sustained and deep contributions to promoting and encouraging the participation of women in the mathematical sciences through AWM, the Joint Committee on Women, the MAA, and through leadership in academia".
