= De numeris triangularibus et inde de progressionibus arithmeticis: Magisteria magna =

17th-century mathematics text

De numeris triangularibus et inde de progressionibus arithmeticis: Magisteria magna is a 38-page mathematical treatise written in the early 17th century by Thomas Harriot, lost for many years, and finally published in facsimile form in 2009 in the book Thomas Harriot's Doctrine of Triangular Numbers: the "Magisteria Magna". Harriot's work dates from before the invention of calculus, and uses finite differences to accomplish many of the tasks that would later be made more easy by calculus.

== De numeris triangularibus ==
Thomas Harriot wrote De numeris triangularibus et inde de progressionibus arithmeticis: Magisteria magna in the early 1600s, and showed it to his friends. By 1618 it was complete, but in 1621 Harriot died before publishing it. Some of its material was published posthumously, in 1631, as Artis analyticae praxis, but the rest languished in the British Library among many other pages of Harriot's works, and became forgotten until its rediscovery in the late 1700s. It was finally published in its entirety, as part of the 2009 book Thomas Harriot’s Doctrine of Triangular Numbers: the "Magisteria Magna".

The title can be translated as "The Great Doctrine of triangular numbers and, through them, of arithmetic progressions". Harriot's work concerns finite differences, and their uses in interpolation for calculating mathematical tables for navigation. Harriot forms the triangular numbers through the inverse process to finite differencing, partial summation, starting from a sequence of constant value one. Repeating this process produces the higher-order binomial coefficients, which in this way can be thought of as generalized triangular numbers, and which give the first part of Harriot's title.

Harriot's results were only improved 50 years later by Isaac Newton, and prefigure Newton's use of Newton polynomials for interpolation. As reviewer Matthias Schemmel writes, this work "shows what was possible in dealing with functional relations before the advent of the calculus".

The work was written as a 38-page manuscript in Latin, and Harriot wrote it up as if for publication, with a title page. However, much of its content consists of calculations and formulas with very little explanatory text, leading at least some of Harriot's contemporaries such as Sir Charles Cavendish to complain of the difficulty of understanding it.

== Thomas Harriot’s Doctrine ==
The monograph Thomas Harriot’s Doctrine of Triangular Numbers: the "Magisteria Magna", edited by Janet Beery and Jackie Stedall, was published in 2009 by the European Mathematical Society in their newly created Heritage of European Mathematics series. Its subject is De numeris triangularibus, and the third of its three sections consists of a facsimile reproduction of Harriot's manuscript, with each page facing a page of commentary by the editors, including translations of its Latin passages. The earlier parts of Beery and Stedall's book survey the material in Harriot's work, the context for this work, the chronology of its loss and recovery, and the effect of this work on the 17th-century mathematicians who read it.

Although reviewer Matthias Schemmel suggests that the 2009 monograph is primarily aimed at historians of mathematics, who "will welcome this book as providing new insights into the development of mathematics", he suggests that it may also be of interest to other mathematicians and could perk their interest in the history of mathematics.
