= Lauren Lynn Rose =

American mathematician

- Education: Tufts University (BA, 1982); Cornell University (MS, 1985; PhD, 1988)
- Known for: Educational Mathematics, Math Outreach, Quads
- Children: 1
- Awards: AWM Fellow
- Scientific career
- Fields: Algebraic combinatorics, Commutative algebra, Discrete Geometry, Math Outreach
- Institutions: Ohio State University , Wellesley College, Bard College
- Thesis: The Structure of Modules of Splines over Polynomial Rings (1988)
- Doctoral advisor: Louis Billera
- Website: https://laurenrose.org/

Lauren Lynn Rose is an Associate Professor of Mathematics at Bard College and founder of several mathematical outreach programs.

== Education ==
Rose received her B.A. in Mathematics from Tufts University in 1982. In 1985, she was a visiting graduate student at Rutgers University. In 1985, she received her Master's of Science from Cornell University. She continued on at Cornell to earn her Ph.D. in Mathematics in 1988. Her dissertation, The Structure of Modules of Splines over Polynomial Rings, was supervised by Louis Billera.

== Career ==
In 1987, Rose did a post-doc and taught at Ohio State University. In 1990, she became an assistant professor at Wellesley College until 1997 before she began teaching at Bard College as an assistant professor. She was promoted to associate professor in 2000 at Bard College.

Rose is a member of National Museum of Mathematics advisory council.

== Math outreach ==
Rose co-founded a Math Circle at Bard College called the "Bard Math Circle" in 2007 alongside colleague Japheth Wood, and later started the Mid-Hudson Math Teacher’s Circle in 2013, and the Girls' Math Club in 2017 al. The Bard Math Circle was created by students and faculty at Bard College to address the death of math enrichment opportunities in the Mid-Hudson Valley for elementary, middle, and high school students. The Girls' Math Club was aimed at improving girls' confidence in math and encouraging them in the field starting in middle school. It was made possible by a $6,000 grant form the Mathematical Association of America known as the Tensor Women and Mathematics Grant.

Rose is a co-organizer of the Julia Robinson Mathematics Festival Community Math Circle.

Rose is the founder of Math & Girls + Inspiration = Success (MAGPIES). MAGPIES is a virtual mathematics outreach program created during the academic year 2020–2021 to address the lack of outreach opportunities during the pandemic. It is primarily for upper elementary to middle school girls with the goal of creating a "safe space for girls to experience the joy of mathematics in a collaborative and inclusive setting".

Rose is a national leader in the math circle movement, and in 2022 she chaired the Special Interest Group of the MAA on math circles for students and teachers.

== Awards and honors ==
In 2022, Rose was selected as an AWM Fellow for her "broad efforts in the professional development of women in mathematics ... her commitment to involving people from diverse communities in mathematics, through Math Circles and outreach in prisons; and for her creative contributions to the AWM including the We Speak Series and the Card Project".

== Game designer ==
Rose is a co-creator of the card game EvenQuads. This card game is a SET-like game and was produced in 2021 by the Association for Women in Mathematics (AWM). The EvenQuads deck allows for five different games to be played and has biographies of women mathematicians on the back.

== Selected publications ==
- Billera, Louis; Rose, Lauren (1991). "A dimension series for multivariate splines". Discrete & Computational Geometry. 6: 107–128. doi:10.1007/BF02574678.
- Billera, Louis J.; Rose, Lauren L. (January 1992). "Modules of piecewise polynomials and their freeness". Mathematische Zeitschrift. 209 (1): 485–497. doi:10.1007/BF02570848.
- Rose, Lauren L; Terao, Hiroaki (February 1991). "A free resolution of the module of logarithmic forms of a generic arrangement". Journal of Algebra. 136 (2): 376–400. doi:10.1016/0021-8693(91)90052-A.
