= MAA FOCUS =

- Cover of January 2009 issue
- Editor: Jacqueline Jensen-Vallin
- Categories: Mathematics
- Frequency: 6 times a year starting in 2009
- Paid circulation: 22,100
- Unpaid circulation: 300
- Total circulation: 22,400 (2008)
- First issue: March 1981
- Company: Mathematical Association of America
- Country: United States
- Based in: Washington, D.C.
- Language: English
- Website: http://www.maa.org/pubs/focus.html
- ISSN: 0731-2040

MAA FOCUS is the newsmagazine of the Mathematical Association of America. It carries news items and short articles of interest to the organization's members.

== History and profile ==
The magazine was first published in March 1981; the first editor was Marcia P. Sward, who held that position until September 1985. Beginning in 2009 the magazine is published six times a year; previously it was published nine times a year. The magazine is printed on glossy paper with a final trim size of 8-1/4 inches wide by 10-5/8 inches high. Circulation in 2008 was 22,400 copies.
