= Dianne P. O'Leary =

American mathematician

- Born: November 20, 1951 (age 74); Chicago, Illinois
- Education: Purdue University; Stanford University
- Awards: Hertz Foundation Fellow; Fellow of the Association for Computing Machinery (2006); Fellow of Society for Industrial and Applied Mathematics (2009)
- Scientific career
- Fields: Applied mathematics Scientific computing
- Workplaces: University of Michigan; University of Maryland, College Park
- Thesis: Hybrid Conjugate Gradient Algorithms (1976)
- Doctoral advisor: Gene H. Golub
- Doctoral students: Misha Kilmer; Tamara G. Kolda

Dianne Prost O'Leary (born 1951) is an American mathematician and computer scientist whose research concerns scientific computing, computational linear algebra, and the history of scientific computing. She is Distinguished University Professor Emerita of Computer Science at the University of Maryland, College Park, and is the author of the book Scientific Computing with Case Studies (SIAM, 2009).

== Early life and education ==
O'Leary was born November 20, 1951, in Chicago. She majored in mathematics at Purdue University, graduating in 1972, and completed her Ph.D. in computer science at Stanford University in 1976. Her dissertation, Hybrid Conjugate Gradient Algorithms, was supervised by Gene H. Golub.

== Career ==
After taking an assistant professorship in mathematics at the University of Michigan, she moved to Maryland in 1978, with a joint appointment in computer science and the Institute for Physical Science and Technology. She also became affiliated with Maryland's applied mathematics program in 1979, and became a member of Maryland's Institute for Advanced Computer Studies in 1985. She became Distinguished University Professor in 2014, the same year that she retired.

From 2009 to 2015 she was editor in chief of the SIAM Journal on Matrix Analysis and Applications.

== Recognition ==
The University of Waterloo gave O'Leary an honorary doctorate in 2005. She was named a Fellow of the Association for Computing Machinery in 2006, "for mentoring activities and contributions to numerical algorithms", and became one of the inaugural Fellows of the Society for Industrial and Applied Mathematics (SIAM) in 2009. In 2008 she was the Sonia Kovalevsky Lecturer of SIAM and the Association for Women in Mathematics.
