= Marcia P. Sward =

American mathematician

- Born: February 1, 1939; Maywood, Illinois
- Died: September 21, 2008 (aged 69); Washington, D.C.
- Education: University of Illinois Urbana-Champaign
- Awards: AMS Citation for Public Service
- Scientific career
- Doctoral advisor: Edward J. Scott

Marcia Peterson Sward (February 1, 1939 – September 21, 2008) was an American mathematician and nonprofit organization administrator. She had a varied career as a teacher and an administrator of mathematical organizations, culminating in the position of executive director of the Mathematical Association of America. After retirement she started a new career in environmental education, specializing in children's programs such as GreenKids.

== Life and education ==
Sward was born Marcia Ruth Peterson in Maywood, Illinois on February 1, 1939.

She received a bachelor's degree from Vassar College in 1961. She received a master's degree in 1963 and a PhD in mathematics in 1967 from the University of Illinois at Urbana-Champaign. Her PhD thesis was written under Edward J. Scott and titled The Mixed Boundary Value Problem Along the Line of Parabolicity for a Certain Class of Hyperbolic Partial Differential Equations.

Sward died in Washington, D.C., on September 21, 2008.

== Work ==
Sward was unable to get an academic job immediately after receiving her PhD, and worked as a housemother at Catholic University in Washington, D.C. She then received an appointment at Trinity College in Washington, D.C., and worked there from 1968 to 1980 and was department head from 1979 to 1980.

Sward then switched in mid-career from academic to nonprofit organization executive. She stated in an interview with Association Management magazine that one reason was a low threshold of boredom, but also emphasized the need to stretch one's skills. She said, "As a professor I really didn't manage anything. The focus was on the intellectual work. So when I switched to association management, I had to learn how to manage programs, delegate, work with committees, raise money, work with budgets." Her first executive position was as the first Associate Executive Director of the Mathematical Association of America. Among the duties of the newly created position were directing the organization's three journals and creating a newsletter that turned out to be MAA Focus. Sward became the newsletter's first editor and held that position for the remainder of her time as Associate Executive Director.

She left the MAA in September 1985 to become the first executive director of the Mathematical Sciences Education Board of the United States National Research Council, then returned in 1989 as executive director of the MAA upon the retirement of Alfred B. Willcox. During this time she helped create many new programs, for example Project NExT, for which she persuaded ExxonMobil to provide funding. She worked with Ed Dubinsky to develop Special Interest Groups inside MAA. She received the Citation for Public Service from the Council of the American Mathematical Society in 1992.

In 1999 Sward retired from the executive director position and spent a year sailing in The Bahamas. She switched careers again to work with the National Environmental Education and Training Foundation as senior director for education and environment and then in 2004 became Deputy Executive Director of the Audubon Naturalist Society of the Central Atlantic States. She led their Environmental Education department until her death in 2008. During her time there she worked to get the ANS Nature Preschool started, began the GreenKids program (an outreach program that sends naturalists to Montgomery County, Maryland, schools), and helped start the Loudoun Environmental Stewardship Alliance. She was influenced by Richard Louv's book Last Child in the Woods to work on projects that made a difference in the lives of children.

== Selected publications ==
- Jon W. Scott; Tina H. Straley; Marcia P. Sward, eds. (2004). Leading the Mathematical Sciences Department. Washington, D.C.: Mathematical Association of America. ISBN 978-0-88385-174-6.
