= Katharine Ott =

American mathematician

Katharine A. "Katy" Ott is an American mathematician specializing in harmonic analysis and partial differential equations, and known for her advocacy of women in mathematics. She is a professor of mathematics at Bates College in Lewiston, Maine, where she chairs the Department of Mathematics.

== Education and career ==
Ott is originally from Cumberland, Maine. She was an undergraduate at Middlebury College, graduating in 2003. She went to the University of Virginia for graduate study in mathematics, received a master's degree there in 2005, and completed her Ph.D. in 2008. Her doctoral dissertation, Boundary Integral Equations in Non-Smooth Domains, was supervised by Irina Mitrea.

After postdoctoral research at the University of Kentucky, she continued at the University of Kentucky as an assistant professor beginning in 2011. At the University of Kentucky, she organized the Sonia Kovalevsky Day program of activities for female secondary school students and their teachers. In 2014 she moved to Bates College; she was tenured there as an associate professor in 2018 and promoted to full professor in 2024.

== Recognition ==
For her work organizing the Sonia Kovalevsky Day program, Ott received the 2014 National Service Award of the Association for Women in Mathematics. She was named a Fellow of the Association for Women in Mathematics in 2024, "for immense dedication to outreach to girls and women, including directing GirlsGetMath at ICERM; supporting AWM through committees, grant-writing, the newsletter, and AWM’s USA Science and Engineering Festival booth; and leading award-winning tutoring and volunteering initiatives in Maine".

Bates College gave Ott the 2023 Kroepsch Award for Excellence in Teaching, the highest teaching award of the college.
