= EDGE program =

Educational organization

EDGE Foundation
- Established: 1998
- Founders: Sylvia Bozeman; Rhonda Hughes
- Type: 501(c)(3) nonprofit organization
- President: Ami Radunskaya
- Vice President: Ulrica Wilson
- Secretary and Treasurer: Talithia Williams
- Board of directors: Sylvia Bozeman; Robert Bryant; Cecilia Conrad; Ingrid Daubechies; Lloyd Douglas; Raegan Higgins; Rhonda Hughes; Ellen Kirkman
- Website: EDGE Foundation

The EDGE Program was established in 1998 to help women get advanced degrees in mathematics. It is sponsored by the EDGE Foundation (Enhancing Diversity in Graduate Education), established in 2013 in Claremont, California, United States.

== History ==
The EDGE program was launched in 1998 by Sylvia Bozeman and Rhonda Hughes to support female students pursuing graduate degrees in the mathematical sciences. The first EDGE summer session was held at Bryn Mawr College in 1998 and the location alternated between Bryn Mawr and Spelman College until 2003. Since 2003 the summer program has been hosted by Pomona College, Florida A&M University, Harvey Mudd College, Mills College, New College of Florida, North Carolina A&T State University, North Carolina State University, Purdue University, and Texas Tech.

In 2013, the Sylvia Bozeman and Rhonda Hughes EDGE Foundation was established. The mission of this 501(c)(3) non-profit organization is to support and oversee all EDGE programming.

== Purpose ==
The EDGE program is designed to offer comprehensive mentoring for women pursuing careers in the mathematical sciences. Activities are designed to provide ongoing support toward the academic development and research productivity at several critical stages, including entering graduate students, advanced graduate students, postdocs and early career mathematicians. Along with its signature summer session, the Foundation supports an annual conference, mini-sabbaticals for research collaborations, regional research symposia, regional mentoring clusters, travel support for research talks, and other open-ended mentoring activities. The EDGE Summer Session is a four-week residential program for women entering graduate programs in the mathematical sciences. The workshops are immersion experiences that simulate the fast pace of studying graduate level mathematics.

== Sponsors ==
EDGE receives support from The National Science Foundation. Other sponsors include:

American Mathematical Society
Bryn Mawr College
California State Polytechnic University, Pomona
Cornell University
Henry Luce Foundation
National Security Agency
Pomona College
Spelman College
Springer Publishing
Texas Tech University
University of Michigan
University of Nebraska–Lincoln
University of Washington
Worcester Polytechnic Institute

== Impact and awards ==
In 2015 EDGE received the Presidential Award for Excellence in Science, Mathematics and Engineering Mentoring (PAESMEM) The citation for the award commented on the phenomenal success of this organization, and noted that at the time of the award over 200 women had participated in 16 EDGE summer sessions. Fifty-six women (of whom 46 percent are minorities) had completed Ph.D. programs, and over 65 were still working toward their Ph.D. Remarkably, in 2009, EDGE participants accounted for over 35 percent of all Ph.D.s granted to African-American women.

In 2019, Karen Uhlenbeck became the first woman to be awarded the prestigious Abel Prize, which is considered the Nobel Prize of mathematics. On May 21, 2019, Uhlenbeck was presented the Abel Prize by King Harald of Norway, and in an interview with Ionica Smeets following the ceremony, Uhlenbeck announced that she will be donating half of her Abel Prize award to the EDGE program and the Institute for Advanced Study's Women and Mathematics (WAM) Program.

On April 11, 2015, the Association for Women in Mathematics presented their “A Mathematics Program that Makes a Difference” Award to EDGE and commended Sylvia Bozeman and Rhonda Hughes for their success in promoting diversity. The citation reads, in part:

Be it resolved that the American Mathematical Society and its Committee on the Profession recognize the Enhancing Diversity in Graduate Education Program for its significant efforts to increase the presence of women, with a special focus on women of color, in the upper ranks of mathematical scientists.

In September 2019, the book A Celebration of the EDGE Program's Impact on the Mathematics Community and Beyond (edited by Susan D'Agostino, Amy Buchman, Sarah Bryant, Michelle Craddock Guinn, and Leona Harris) was published by Springer in their Association for Women in Mathematics Series.

== Karen EDGE Fellowship Program ==
When Karen Uhlenbeck won the Abel Prize she donated a large part of it to the EDGE Foundation, which subsequently set up the Karen EDGE Fellowship Program. The Karen EDGE Fellows include:

- Pamela Harris – 2020 Inaugural Class of Fellows
- Mohamed Omar – 2020 Inaugural Class of Fellows
- Bobby Wilson – 2020 Inaugural Class of Fellows
- Emille Lawrence – 2021
- Manuel Rivera – 2021
- Malena Español – 2022
- Henok Mawi – 2023
- Mariana Smit Vega Garcia – 2024

== Similarly named organizations ==
This EDGE foundation should not be confused with the similarly named Evidence and Data for Gender Equality (EDGE) project, an initiative of the United Nations Statistics Division that seeks to improve statistics associated with gender issues. There is also a science and technology think tank and website named Edge Foundation, Inc. and a UK-based educational foundation called Edge.
