= Tai Melcher =

American mathematician

Tai Alexis Melcher is an American mathematician and an associate professor of mathematics at the University of Virginia. Her research combines mathematical analysis and probability theory, especially focusing on heat kernels in degenerate geometric spaces.

== Education and career ==
Melcher completed her Ph.D. in 2004 at the University of California, San Diego, with the dissertation Hypoelliptic Heat Kernel Inequalities on Lie Groups supervised by Bruce Driver.

After postdoctoral research at the University of California, Berkeley, she joined the University of Virginia mathematics department, and was tenured there in 2015.

== Recognition ==
Melcher was one of two 2014 recipients of the AWM Service Award of the Association for Women in Mathematics. She was named as a Fellow of the Association for Women in Mathematics, in the 2027 class of fellows, "for her creation of the Women in Probability network; co-organizing various activities thereof; professional mentoring of early career probabilists; and involvement in numerous AWM events".
