= Margaret Bayer =

American mathematician

- Born: 1955 (age 70–71)
- Education: Cornell University (PhD, 1983)
- Scientific career
- Institutions: University of Kansas
- Thesis: Facial Enumeration in Polytopes, Spheres and Other Complexes (1983)
- Academic advisors: Louis Joseph Billera
- Website: https://bayer.ku.edu/

Margaret M. Bayer is an American mathematician working in polyhedral combinatorics. She is a professor of mathematics at the University of Kansas.

== Education ==
Bayer earned her Ph.D. in 1983 from Cornell University. Her dissertation, Facial Enumeration in Polytopes, Spheres and Other Complexes, was supervised by Louis Billera.

== Recognition ==
Bayer was a Sigma Xi Distinguished Lecturer for 1998–1999.

In 2012 the University of Kansas named Bayer as one of 24 "Women of Distinction" among their students, faculty, and alumnae.

Bayer was one of the inaugural winners of the AWM Service Award of the Association for Women in Mathematics, in 2013, for her work editing book reviews for the AWM Newsletter. In 2020 Bayer was named a Fellow of the Association for Women in Mathematics "for her far-reaching work on the combinatorics and geometry of polytopes; for a long record of successfully mentoring, advising, and supervising women in mathematics at all levels; and for her service to AWM and the profession."

== Personal life ==
She was married to Ralph Byers (1955–2007), also a mathematician at the University of Kansas; they had two daughters.
