= Grandma Got STEM =

Grandma Got STEM is a blog by Rachel Levy, a mathematician at Harvey Mudd College, about earlier generations of women in science, technology, engineering, and mathematics (STEM). Levy founded the blog in March 2013, and by June 2013 had already accumulated 100 posts to it.

The blog is aimed at a general audience. Its entries include pictures and stories about women who worked in STEM fields, and are intended to counter stereotypes of older women as being technologically inept, as well as to inspire future generations of women in STEM.

As the name of the blog suggests, the women featured on the blog are generally old enough to be grandmothers, although not all of them had children. Although many famous researchers are included, the blog posts also feature women who worked at lower-level teaching and laboratory assistant positions in STEM.
