= Janet Beery =

American mathematician and historian

Janet Lynn Beery is an American mathematician and historian of mathematics who serves as a professor of mathematics and computer science at the University of Redlands. She also served as the editor-in-chief of mathematics history journal Convergence from 2009 to 2019, and has authored a book on the mathematics of Thomas Harriot.

== Education and career ==
Beery graduated from the University of Puget Sound in 1983, majoring in mathematics and English literature. She went to Dartmouth College for her graduate education in mathematics, earning a master's degree there in 1985 and completing her Ph.D. in 1989. Her dissertation, Transitive Groups of Prime Degree, was in group theory, supervised by Thomas F. Bickel.

While at Dartmouth, she also worked as an instructor at the University of Puget Sound. She has been on the University of Redlands faculty since 1989.

== Contributions ==
With Jackie Stedall, Beery is the editor of Thomas Harriot’s Doctrine of Triangular Numbers: the 'Magisteria Magna' (European Mathematical Society, 2009). She is also an editor of Women in Mathematics – Celebrating the Centennial of the Mathematical Association of America (Springer, 2017), with Sarah J. Greenwald, Jacqueline Jensen-Vallin, and Maura Mast.

She has been editor-in-chief of Convergence, a journal of the Mathematical Association of America, since 2009. She has also been active with the College Board in developing examination questions and instructional material for the AP Calculus exam, and has been clerk of the Association for Women in Mathematics since 2014.

== Recognition ==
In 2010 the Mathematical Association of America gave Beery their Meritorious Service Award.
