= Bobby Wilson (mathematician) =

Mathematician

- Education: University of Chicago
- Known for: Harmonic Analysis, Dispersive PDE, Geometric measure theory
- Awards: Karen EDGE Fellow (2020)
- Scientific career
- Fields: Mathematics
- Workplaces: University of Washington
- Doctoral advisor: Wilhelm Schlag

Bobby Wilson is a mathematician and associate professor at the University of Washington.

== Professional career and research ==
Wilson obtained his Ph.D. at the University of Chicago in 2015 under the supervision of Wilhelm Schlag. He was an undergraduate at Morehouse College. He was a CLE Moore Instructor at MIT 2015–2018. He was twice an MSRI Postdoctoral Fellow (New Challenges in PDE and Harmonic Analysis) and will participate in the MSRI program Mathematical problems in fluid dynamics in 2021. His research "has been primarily concerned with questions concerning structure theory of measures and the dynamics of dispersive evolutionary equations."

== Honors ==
In 2020, he was awarded one of three Karen EDGE Fellowships and he was profiled in Mathematically Gifted & Black.
