= Yashashree Kulkarni =

Indian-American materials scientist

Yashashree Kulkarni is a Bill D. Cook Professor of Mechanical Engineering at the University of Houston, and the president of the Society Of Engineering Science. Her research involves the mechanical properties of advanced materials, including nanocrystalline and nanotwinned metals.

== Education and career ==
Kulkarni studied civil engineering as an undergraduate at IIT Bombay in India, graduating in 2001. She then went to the California Institute of Technology for graduate study in applied mechanics, earned a master's degree in 2002, and completed her Ph.D. in 2006. Her dissertation, Coarse-Graining of Atomistic Description at Finite Temperature, was supervised by Michael Ortiz.

After postdoctoral research at the University of California, San Diego, Kulkarni joined the University of Houston as an assistant professor of mechanical engineering in 2009. She was elected president of the Society Of Engineering Science in 2024.

== Recognition ==
Kulkarni was the 2017 recipient of the Sia Nemat-Nassar Early Career Award of the American Society of Mechanical Engineers (ASME). She was elected as an ASME Fellow in 2022.
