= Heather Russell =

Canadian singer

- Born: August 10, 2000 (age 25)
- Origin: Toronto, Canada
- Genres: Pop; R&B; jazz; soul
- Occupation: Singer
- Years active: 2010–present
- Website: heatherrussellofficial.com

Heather Marie Russell (born August 10, 2000) is a Canadian singer-songwriter. Her sound is predominantly pop/soul & contemporary R&B music.

She was signed to Syco Records at the age of 10 by Simon Cowell. Russell and her father co-wrote the song "Crazy Glue" with Rune Westberg and Victoria Horn *Lady V which Jessica Sanchez, American Idol 2012 contestant, covered on her debut EP.

== Early life ==
Russell was born on August 10, 2000, in Toronto, Canada. Her parents Monica Cidade and James Russell (divorced), who are also musicians, raised her with her younger brother Robin. She expressed that she wanted to be a singer/songwriter at the age of 5 at which time she started taking piano lessons and began to write songs with her father.

== Career ==
After one month on YouTube, her original song "Beautiful" garnered the attention of Rob Fusari, who then signed Russell to a production deal. Fusari introduced Heather to Simon Cowell and had her flown to London to meet him. Upon meeting, and witnessing her performance, Cowell signed Russell on the spot to a temporary recording contract with Syco Entertainment. She then signed for talent representation with Rob Light at CAA. The Syco Entertainment recording contract ended in 2012 allowing Russell to dedicate her time with Rob Light at CAA.

Since the age of 11, Russell has worked with producers and writers Babyface, Rob Fusari, Walter Afanasieff, Evan Bogart, Neffu, Smith Carlson, Onree Gill and Howard Benson. In 2013, she worked with BBox Entertainment which then signed a distribution agreement with Kobalt Label Services in the spring of 2015. BBOX/Kobalt released Russell's debut EP, Phases, in October 2015. The video for "Got This Feeling" premiered with Tiger Beat Magazine and was featured on Us Weekly.

Russell's single, "Got This Feeling", was used in an episode of Pretty Little Liars on January 12, 2016.
