= Michael Ortiz (mathematician) =

Spanish-American researcher (born 1954)

Miguel Ortiz
- Born: 6 August 1954 (age 72) (Francoist Spain)
- Education: University of California, Berkeley (MS, PhD); Polytechnic University of Madrid (BS)
- Known for: Quasi continuum method, optimal transportation mesh-free (OTM), variational methods in computational mechanics
- Scientific career
- Workplaces: Brown University; California Institute of Technology; Bonn University
- Thesis: Topics in constitutive theory for inelastic solids (1981)
- Doctoral advisor: Egor Popov
- Doctoral students: Yashashree Kulkarni

Miguel Ortiz (born August 6, 1954) is a dual Spanish-American scientist and researcher in the fields of structural, continuum and computational mechanics and is a Frank and Ora Lee Marble Professor Emeritus of Aeronautics and Mechanical Engineering at California Institute of Technology. Prior to his arrival at Caltech in 1995, he was Professor of Engineering at Brown University.

Since 2020 he is a Professor Emeritus in the Engineering and Applied Science Division at Caltech, also holding positions as Research Chair in the Institute of Applied Mathematics, University of Bonn and as adjunct professor and Timoshenko Distinguished Fellow in the departments of Mechanical Engineering and Aeronautics and Astronautics of Stanford University.

== Awards ==
- Rodney Hill Prize, International Union of Theoretical and Applied Mechanics (IUTAM) 2008.
- Timoshenko Medal, American Society of Mechanical Engineers (ASME), 2015.
- Doctor Honoris Causa, Universidad Politecnica de Madrid, Spain, 2019.
- John von Neumann Medal, US Association for Computational Mechanics (USACM), 2019.

== Academy Membership ==
- 2013 Elected Member of the U.S. National Academy of Engineering (NAE).
- 2007 Elected Fellow of the American Academy of Arts & Sciences (AAAS).
- 1999 Corresponding Member, Spanish Academy of Engineering.
