= Sylvia Bozeman =

American mathematician

- Born: August 1, 1947; Camp Hill, Alabama
- Education: Alabama A&M University; Vanderbilt University; Emory University
- Parent(s): Horace T. Sr. Robbie Jones
- Scientific career
- Thesis: Representations of Generalized Inverses of Fredholm Operators (1980)
- Academic advisors: Luis Kramarz

Sylvia D. Trimble Bozeman (née Sylvia Trimble, born 1 August 1947) is an African American mathematician and mathematics educator and professor emerita at Spelman College.

== Early life and education ==
Sylvia Bozeman was born in Camp Hill, Alabama on 1 August 1947. She was the third of five children to Horace T. Sr. (an insurance agent) and Robbie Jones (a housewife). Her mother was the first to cultivate Bozeman’s love for mathematics. Bozeman attended segregated primary and secondary schools in Camp Hill, and was encouraged by her teachers and parents to continue her education. Her high school mathematics teacher, Mr. Frank Holley, further cultivated her interest. He came back after school and taught trigonometry (a course not offered in the curriculum) to her and a group of committed students.

Bozeman graduated from Edward Bell High School in Camp Hill in 1964 and enrolled in undergraduate studies in mathematics at the historically black school Alabama A&M University, during which she also worked on summer projects at NASA and Harvard University. She graduated in 1968 as salutatorian and moved with her husband Robert, also a mathematician, to Vanderbilt University, which had been integrated the prior year, where they both began their graduate studies. She earned a master's degree in 1970, despite not having studied much of the prerequisite coursework that her white classmates had.

In 1968, linear algebra was emerging as a regular required course in mathematics curricula. It was offered for the first time when she was a senior at Alabama A&M, but she didn't take it. The Vanderbilt faculty suggested Bozeman take it her first year in graduate school, but when she realized it was an undergraduate course, she refused, later saying "I paid for that decision for the rest of my graduate years. I spent a long time trying to learn linear algebra on my own".

== Doctorate and career ==
As my career provides me with many opportunities of professional involvement, it is my commitment to always remain 'connected' with mathematics through teaching and/or other scholarly endeavors, and to continue to promote the development of women in mathematics.

— Sylvia Bozeman, 1997

The Bozemans had a son and a daughter while Sylvia taught part-time at Vanderbilt and Tennessee State University and Robert finished his doctoral studies in mathematics. The areas of her research have included operator theory, image processing, and efforts to enhance the success of groups currently underrepresented in mathematics.

In 1974, Bozeman took a teaching position at Spelman College, a college for Black women in Atlanta, Georgia; Robert was then teaching at the nearby Morehouse College, another historically Black college. While there, she worked under Shirley Mathis McBay, Etta Zuber Falconer, and Gladys Glass, mathematicians who were pushing to improve Spelman's science and Mathematics programs. She began as an instructor in 1974, became assistant professor in 1980, an associate in 1984, and full professor in 1991. Throughout her years at Spelman, Bozeman taught classes including calculus, abstract algebra, transition to higher math, and linear algebra. She also enjoyed mentoring students and junior faculty.

In 1976, Bozeman took up graduate studies again at Emory University while continuing to hold a position at Spelman. She earned her doctorate from Emory in 1980 under the supervision of Luis Kramarz and John Neuberger; her thesis was titled Representations of Generalized Inverses of Fredholm Operators. This made her the 23rd or 24th black woman to receive a Math Ph.D. in the United States.

Bozeman served as chair of the Spelman Mathematics Department from 1982 to 1993, as a vice provost for the college, and as an adjunct faculty member in the Math Department at Atlanta University from 1983 to 1985. In 1993, Bozeman established the Center for the Scientific Applications of Mathematics at Spelman College, and served as director.

Bozeman retired from Spelman in 2013 after serving the college for 39 years.

== EDGE program ==
Sylvia Bozeman was one of the founders of Enhancing Diversity in Graduate Education (EDGE), a transition program for women entering graduate studies in mathematical sciences. According to Bozeman, male faculty tend to be less sensitive to how women treat their studies; for example, women might not speak in class unless they really know what they are talking about, and generally have higher standards for their grades.

Students in the EDGE program form study groups and learn how to give and receive information; the program also brings in senior graduates and panelists. In 2007 the EDGE Program was given special recognition by the American Mathematical Society for its effectiveness.

== Research and recognition ==
Bozeman's research has focused on functional analysis and image processing, and has been funded by the Army Research Office, the National Science Foundation, and NASA.

Her efforts to encourage women from underrepresented groups to pursue graduate degrees in mathematics were recognized by President Obama when he appointed her to the President’s Committee on the National Medal of Science. Her awards, honors, and recognitions include:

- Distinguished Alumni of the Year Award – Alabama A&M University/NAFEO (1996)
- Presidential Faculty Award for Distinguished Service – Spelman College (1995)
- Distinguished Teaching Award - Southeastern Section of the Mathematical Association of America (MAA) (1995)
- White House Initiative Faculty Award for Excellence in Science and Technology (1988)
- Tenneco UNCF Award for Excellence in Teaching (1988)
- Election to Phi Beta Kappa
- Section Governor in the Mathematical Association of America, the first African-American to reach that level (1997)
- Fellow of the American Association for the Advancement of Science (2009)
- Fellow of the American Mathematical Society (AMS) (2012)
- Fellow of the Association for Women in Mathematics, in the inaugural class (2017)
- Black History Month Honoree – Mathematically Gifted & Black (2017)
- In 2019 she received the inaugural MAA Award for Inclusivity.

She is a former AMS Council member at large. She was included in a deck of playing cards featuring notable women mathematicians published by the Association for Women in Mathematics.
