= Pao-sheng Hsu =

Mathematics educator

- Education: 1975 PhD
- Alma mater: Polytechnic University
- Occupation: Mathematics educator
- Years active: 1975–present

Pao-sheng Hsu is a mathematics educator, an independent consultant and researcher.

== Career ==
After primary school, Pao-sheng Hsu’s education was conducted in both Chinese and English, with Chinese history and literature taught in Chinese and other subjects taught in English. Hsu completed her PhD under George Bachman at Polytechnic University (previously the Polytechnic Institute of New York, now the New York University Tandon School of Engineering) in 1975; her dissertation was titled An Application of Compactification: Some Theorems on Maximal Ideals.

In 1999, 2000, and 2001, Hsu served in the "Human Rights of Mathematicians" committee of the American Mathematical Society.

In 2006, Hsu, mathematician and past Association for Women in Mathematics (AWM) president Suzanne Lenhart and middle school teacher Erica Voolich founded the AWM Teacher Partnership Program. "The goal of the program is to link teachers of mathematics in schools, museums, technical institutes, two-year colleges, and universities with other teachers working in an environment different from their own and with mathematicians working in business, government, and industry." At the outset, the program focused on pairing individuals. In March 2011, the program was revised with a new format to provide a forum to exchange ideas related to issues that both mathematicians and teachers of mathematics perceive as important. As of 2007, she is an organizer of the AWM Teacher Partnership, with Suzanne Lenhart and Erica Voolich. She also translated a news article about the discussion "Complexities and Opportunities for Women in Mathematics" at the 2002 International Congress of Mathematicians for the AWM newsletter.

With Jacqueline Dewar and Harriet Pollatsek, she edited the volume Mathematics Education: A Spectrum of Work in Mathematical Sciences Departments, which was published by Springer International Publishing on 26 November 2016 as part of the Association for Women in Mathematics series.

== Awards ==
Hsu was presented with an Association for Women in Mathematics (AWM) Service Award in 2013 "for her role in establishing the Teacher Partnership, long-time service on the [Math] Education Committee which included representing AWM at the CBMS Forum in 2009 and 2010, and service on the AWM Web Task Force (2008–2010)."

She was elected a fellow of the Association for Women in Mathematics in the Class of 2019 "for her sustained efforts and achievements as a researcher and leader in mathematics education, especially for AWM; for her building of bridges connecting the communities of mathematicians, mathematics educators, and K–12 teachers; and for her work as a teacher and scholar of mathematics".
