= Ellen Kirkman =

American mathematician

- Education: Michigan State University
- Known for: Noncommutative algebra, representation theory
- Awards: Treasurer of Association for Women in Mathematics; Fellow of the American Mathematical Society; Fellow of the Association for Women in Mathematics; Service Award of Association for Women in Mathematics
- Scientific career
- Fields: Mathematics
- Workplaces: Wake Forest University
- Thesis: On the Characterization of Inertial Coefficient Rings (1975)
- Doctoral advisor: Edward E. Ingraham

Ellen Elizabeth Kirkman is a professor of mathematics at Wake Forest University. Her research interests include noncommutative algebra, representation theory, and homological algebra.

== Education ==
She received her Ph.D. in Mathematics and M.A. in Statistics from Michigan State University in 1975. Her doctoral dissertation, On the Characterization of Inertial Coefficient Rings, was supervised by Edward C. Ingraham.

== Professional activities ==
Kirkman is on the board of directors for Enhancing Diversity in Graduate Education (EDGE), a program dedicated to helping women pursuing studies in mathematical sciences. From 2012 to 2020, she served as treasurer of the Association for Women in Mathematics (AWM).

Kirkman's professional activities include serving on the American Mathematical Society (AMS) Nominating Committee from 2009 to 11, as a Mathematical Association of America (MAA) Governor from 2006 to 2008, on the Joint Data Committee of AMS-ASA-MAA-IMS-SIAM (2000– 2007 and 2009–present) and directing the CBMS 2010 survey of undergraduate mathematical sciences programs. She is also an associate editor of Communications in Algebra.

Kirkman served as treasurer and was on the Executive Committee of the Association for Women in Mathematics from 2012 to 2020.

== Recognition ==
In 2012, Kirkman became a fellow of the American Mathematical Society. is also a fellow of the Association for Women in Mathematics inducted in 2019. Additionally, she received service awards from Wake Forest University and the Southeastern Section of the MAA. In 2022, she received the AWM Service Award "for her eight years of service (2012 – 2020) as AWM Treasurer and Chair of the Financial Oversight and Investment Committee, for her service on the Membership Portfolio Committee, and for her role as an organizer and a research leader in the WINART (Women in Noncommutative Algebra and Representation Theory) Research Network."
