= Jackie Stedall =

British mathematics historian

- Born: Jacqueline Anne Stedall; 4 August 1950; Romford, Essex, England, UK
- Died: 27 September 2014 (aged 64)
- Occupation: Mathematics historian

Academic background
- Education: Queen Mary's High School
- Alma mater: Girton College, Cambridge; University of Kent; Bristol Polytechnic; Open University

Academic work
- Discipline: Mathematics
- Sub-discipline: History of mathematics
- Institutions: University of Bristol; The Queen's College, Oxford
- Notable works: The History of Mathematics: A Very Short Introduction (2012)

Jacqueline Anne "Jackie" Stedall (4 August 1950 – 27 September 2014) was a British mathematics historian. She wrote nine books, and appeared on radio on BBC Radio 4's In Our Time programme.

== Early life ==
Stedall was born in Romford, Essex, and attended Queen Mary's High School in Walsall. Her academic achievements included a BA in mathematics from Girton College, Cambridge, an MSc in statistics from the University of Kent, a PGCE from Bristol Polytechnic (now the University of the West of England), and a PhD in the history of mathematics from the Open University. Her PhD focused upon John Wallis' 1685 work Treatise of Algebra.

== Career ==
After her MSc degree, Stedall worked for three years as a statistician at the University of Bristol, and four years as an administrator for War on Want. Subsequently, she worked as a teacher for eight years. Stedall's academic career began in 2000, when she became a Clifford Norton student at The Queen's College, Oxford, studying the history of science. She later became a fellow of the college, and created a third-year module on the history of mathematics at the University of Oxford. In 2002, Stedall became the managing editor of the British Society for the History of Mathematics's newsletter, which later became the BSHM Bulletin journal. She worked alongside fellow mathematical historian Eleanor Robson.

Stedall appeared multiple times on the BBC Radio 4 programme In Our Time. Topics that she discussed on the programme included Archimedes, whether Isaac Newton or Gottfried Wilhelm Leibniz were the founder of calculus, the Fibonacci sequence, prime numbers in finance, and Renaissance era mathematics.

== Books ==
Stedall wrote a 2008 book Mathematics Emerging which was used as the primary textbook for her course. She also co-edited and published the Oxford Handbook of the History of Mathematics. With Janet Beery, she co-edited Thomas Harriot’s Doctrine of Triangular Numbers: the 'Magisteria Magna' (European Mathematical Society, 2009).

In 2012, Stedall wrote the book The History of Mathematics: A Very Short Introduction, part of the Oxford University Press' Very Short Introduction series of books. The book focused on "what mathematical historians do and how they do it". It won the 2013 Neumann Prize for the best English-language book on the history of mathematics.

== Personal life ==
Stedall was married and had two children.

Whilst suffering from cancer, Stedall joined the Painswick Friends' meeting house, which "helped her find peace with her illness". In March 2014, she was robbed by a Romanian fraud gang, who stole her bank card.

Stedall died of cancer on 27 September 2014. In her will, she donated money to Queen's College Library for the preservation of mathematical history books. In 2015, the Canadian Society for History and Philosophy of Mathematics held a special session to remember Stedall, and in 2016, the British Society for the History of Mathematics held a two-day meeting at Queen's College on sixteenth- and seventeenth-century algebra, which they dedicated to Stedall.
