= Misha Kilmer =

American applied mathematician

Misha Elena Kilmer is an American applied mathematician known for her work in numerical linear algebra and scientific computing. She is William Walker Professor of Mathematics at Tufts University. Starting July 1, 2021, she will serve as Deputy Director of ICERM, where she served on the Scientific Advisory Board.

== Education and career ==
Kilmer graduated magna cum laude from Wake Forest University in 1992, and earned a master's degree from Wake Forest in 1994. She completed her Ph.D. in 1997 at the University of Maryland, College Park. Her dissertation, Regularization of Ill-Posed Problems, was jointly supervised by Dianne P. O'Leary and Gilbert W. Stewart. After postdoctoral research at Northeastern University, she joined the Tufts faculty in 1999. She was given the William Walker Professorship in 2016, and chaired the Tufts Mathematics Department from 2013 to 2019.

== Recognition ==
In 2019 Kilmer was named a SIAM Fellow "for her fundamental contributions to numerical linear algebra and scientific computing, including ill-posed problems, tensor decompositions, and iterative methods". She was elected to the 2026 class of Fellows of the American Mathematical Society.
