= Jacqueline Jensen-Vallin =

American mathematician & academic

Jacqueline Ann Jensen-Vallin is an American mathematician. She is a chair and professor of mathematics at Lamar University, former editor-in-chief of MAA FOCUS, the newsletter of the Mathematical Association of America (MAA), and a former governor of the Texas Section of the MAA. Her research interests include combinatorial group theory, low-dimensional topology, and knot theory; she is also known for her work in mathematics education and the history of women in mathematics.

== Education and career ==
Jensen-Vallin did her undergraduate studies at the University of Connecticut, completing a double major in mathematics and psychology in 1995. She went to the University of Oregon for her graduate studies, and completed her doctorate there in 2002. Her dissertation, Finding $\pi_2$-Generators for Exotic Homotopy Types of Two-Complexes, concerned algebraic geometry and was supervised by Micheal Dyer.

After completing her doctorate, she joined the faculty at Sam Houston State University in 2002. She moved to Lamar University in 2014.

== Book ==
With Janet Beery, Sarah J. Greenwald, and Maura B. Mast, Jensen-Vallin is an editor of the book Women in Mathematics: Celebrating the Centennial of the Mathematical Association of America (Springer, 2017).

== Awards and honors ==
Jensen-Vallin was one of the 2008 winners of the Henry L. Alder Award for Distinguished Teaching by a Beginning College or University Mathematics Faculty Member.

The Association for Women in Mathematics gave her their Service Award in 2018.
