= Kathleen Kavanagh =

American applied mathematician

Kathleen Rose Kavanagh (also published as Kathleen R. Fowler) is an American applied mathematician whose research involves simulation-based engineering, particular for problems involving air quality, water quality, and sustainable irrigation. She is a professor of mathematics at Clarkson University, and a director of the New York State Education IMPETUS for Career Success providing science enrichment for middle and high school students in three counties of New York State.. Kavanagh is also the associate director for the Institute for STEM Education at Clarkson University.

== Education and career ==
Kavanagh is a graduate of the State University of New York at Plattsburgh. She completed her Ph.D. at North Carolina State University in 2003; her dissertation, Nonsmooth Nonlinearities in Applications in Hydrology, was supervised by Carl T. (Tim) Kelley. She has been a faculty member in the mathematics department of Clarkson University since 2003, and was promoted to full professor in 2015. She has served as the Vice President for Education for SIAM since October 2018.

== Recognition ==
Kavanagh was a 2010 winner of the Henry L. Alder Award for Distinguished Teaching by a Beginning College or University Mathematics Faculty Member of the Mathematical Association of America. In 2018, Clarkson University gave her their Distinguished Teaching Award.
