= Rachel Levy (mathematician) =

American mathematician and blogger

Rachel Levy (born 1968) is an American mathematician and blogger. She currently serves as the inaugural Executive Director of the North Carolina State University Data Science Academy. She was a 2020-21 AAAS Science and Technology Policy Fellow, serving in the United States Senate and sponsored by the American Mathematical Society. From 2018-2020 she served as deputy executive director of the Mathematical Association of America(2018-2020). As a faculty member at Harvey Mudd College from 2007-2019 her research was in applied mathematics, including the mathematical modeling of thin films, and the applications of fluid mechanics to biology. This work was funded by The National Science Foundation, Research Corporation, Howard Hughes Medical Institute, and US Office of Naval Research.

She now focuses on mathematics education, data science, and undergraduate mathematics research. She served as vice president for education of the Society for Industrial and Applied Mathematics (SIAM), and as editor-in-chief of SIAM Undergraduate Research Online (SIURO), an online publication of SIAM for undergraduate research in applied mathematics.

She currently serves on the following advisory boards:

- National Academies Roundtable on Data Science Postsecondary Education
- Charles A. Dana Center Launch Years Consensus Panel
- Education Advisory Board of the Institute for Computational and Experimental Research in Mathematics (ICERM)
- Mathematics Advisory Group (MAG) of Transforming Postsecondary Education in Mathematics (TPSE)

She was a co-founder of the BIG Math Network and the Math Modeling Hub.

She coined the acronym VITAL for faculty who are visitors, instructors, TAs, adjuncts and lecturers.

== Education and career ==
Levy did her undergraduate studies at Oberlin College, completing a double major in English and Mathematics in 1989. She then earned a master's degree in Educational Media and Instructional Design in 1996 from the University of North Carolina at Chapel Hill, another master's degree in applied mathematics from North Carolina State University, and a PhD in 2005 from North Carolina State University. Her dissertation, Partial differential equations of thin liquid films: analysis and numerical simulation, was supervised by Michael Shearer.

She taught mathematics to secondary school and beginning college students from the time she was an undergraduate until her return to graduate school. After postdoctoral research at Duke University, she joined the Harvey Mudd College faculty from 2007 to 2019. At Harvey Mudd College, she was promoted to Professor of Mathematics and served as Associate Dean for Faculty Development. She was the Iris and Howard Critchell Assistant Professor from 2011 to 2012.

== Contributions and publications ==
Levy co-authored Math Modelling: Computing and Communicating, a practical handbook for high school students with experience with computation and an interest in math modelling. (Society for Industrial and Applied Mathematics, 2018)

With Richard Laugesen and Fadil Santosa, Levy is the author of a book for mathematical scientists seeking work, BIG Jobs Guide: business, industry, and government careers for mathematical scientists, statisticians, and operations researchers (Society for Industrial and Applied Mathematics, 2018)

She is the lead author of the early grade section of the Guidelines for Assessment and Instruction in Mathematical Modeling Education (GAIMME) Report (Society for Industrial and Applied Mathematics and Consortium for Mathematics and Its Applications (COMAP, 2018)

With Michael Shearer, Levy is the author of a textbook on partial differential equations, Partial Differential Equations: An Introduction to Theory and Applications (Princeton University Press, 2015).

Levy's research in applied mathematics has included work on surfactants, miniature robotic submarines, and flukeprints, the tracks left by whales on the surface of the ocean. She has also studied the use of flipped classrooms in undergraduate education.

She created a blog, Grandma Got STEM, about earlier generations of women in science, technology, engineering, and mathematics and currently blogs for MAA MathValues.

== Awards and honors ==
- Fellow of the American Mathematical Society, in its 2027 class of fellows.
- SIAM Fellow in the 2021 class of fellows, "for leadership in applied mathematics education, especially in mathematical modeling, across the entire educational spectrum".
- HMC Leadership Award 2016 Outstanding Faculty Member, April 2016].
- Mathematical Association of America Henry L. Alder Award for Distinguished Teaching, 2013
- Fulbright Specialist Roster, 2015–present.
- Iris and Howard Critchell Chair, Harvey Mudd College, 2011-12.
- Avery Professor, Claremont Graduate University, Spring 2011.
- Project NExT Fellow, American Institute of Mathematics, 2007.
- Microsoft Future Professors Fellowship, 2003-04.

=== Writing recognition ===
- NCTM Linking Research and Practice Outstanding Publication Award, ML Hernández, R Levy, MD Felton-Koestler and R Zbiek, “Modeling in the High School Curriculum,” Mathematics Teacher, vol. 110, no. 5, Dec 2016/Jan 2017.
- MAA Teaching Tidbits, 2016-17 Most Read Blogpost,“5 Ways to Respond when Students Respond with Incorrect Answers.”
- The Best Writing on Mathematics 2016, Featured article, “Industrial Mathematics Inspires Mathematical Modeling Tasks with High Cognitive Demand” from Princeton Companion to Applied Mathematics, 2016.
- American Scientist Macroscope Blog, Most Read Blogpost, 2015 and 2016, “5 Reasons to teach Mathematical Modeling”
- SIAM Student Paper Prize, "Kinetics and Nucleation for Driven Thin Film Flow," 2005.
