= Irina Mitrea =

Romanian mathematician

- Education: University of Bucharest, University of Minnesota
- Awards: Ruth I. Michler Memorial Prize (2008–2009): von Neumann Fellowship (2014–2015); AMS Fellow (2015); AWM Fellow (2019)
- Scientific career
- Fields: Mathematics
- Workplaces: University of Virginia, Worcester Polytechnic Institute, Temple University
- Doctoral advisor: Carlos Kenig, Mikhail Safonov
- Doctoral students: Katharine Ott

Irina Mitrea is a Romanian-American mathematician who works as professor and department chair at the Department of Mathematics of Temple University. She is known for her contributions to harmonic analysis, particularly on the interface of this field with partial differential equations, geometric measure theory, scattering theory, complex analysis and validated numerics. She is also known for her efforts to promote mathematics among young women.

== Education and career ==
Mitrea earned a master's degree from the University of Bucharest in 1993, and completed her doctorate in 2000 at the University of Minnesota under the supervision of Carlos Kenig and Mikhail Safonov. Her dissertation was Spectral Properties of Elliptic Layer Potentials on Non-Smooth Domains. Her publications include over fifty research articles and three books published by Springer‐Verlag, Birkhäuser, and De Gruyter. After temporary positions at the Institute for Advanced Study and Cornell University, she joined the faculty of the University of Virginia in 2004, and earned tenure there in 2007. She also taught at the Worcester Polytechnic Institute before moving to Temple. She is the founder of the Girls and Mathematics Program at Temple University, a week-long summer camp in mathematics for middle-school girls. She is a member of the National Alliance for Doctoral Studies in the Mathematical Sciences, an organization providing mentorship to "build a national community of students, faculty, and staff who will work together to transform our departments, colleges, and universities into institutions where all students are welcome."

== Recognition ==
In 2008, Mitrea won the Ruth I. Michler Memorial Prize of the Association for Women in Mathematics. In 2014, she was elected as a fellow of the American Mathematical Society "for contributions to partial differential equations and related fields as well as outreach to women and under-represented minorities at all educational levels." Also in 2014, Mitrea was awarded a Von Neumann Fellowship at the Institute for Advanced Study in Princeton, New Jersey. In 2015 she received the AWM Service Award from the Association for Women in Mathematics. She is part of the 2019 class of fellows of the Association for Women in Mathematics.
