= List of Very Short Introductions books =

Works in Oxford University Press series

Very Short Introductions is a series of books published by Oxford University Press.

== List of books in the series ==
# on spine	Topic	Author(s)	UK print publication date	Original publication	Category
001	Classics	Mary Beard, John Henderson	24 Feb 2000	1995	Classical Studies
002	Music	Nicholas Cook	24 Feb 2000; 25 Feb 2021 (2nd ed.)	1998	Music
003	Buddhism	Damien Keown	24 Feb 2000; 28 Feb 2013 (2nd ed.)	1996	Religion
004	Literary Theory	Jonathan Culler	24 Feb 2000; 28 July 2011 (2nd ed.)	1997	Literature/Philosophy
005	Hinduism	Kim Knott	24 Feb 2000; 25 Feb 2016 (2nd ed.)	1998	Religion
006	Psychology	Gillian Butler, Freda McManus	24 Feb 2000; 23 Jan 2014 (2nd ed.)	1998	Psychology
007	Islam	Malise Ruthven	24 Feb 2000; 26 Jan 2012 (2nd ed.)	1997	Religion
008	Politics	Kenneth Minogue	24 Feb 2000	1995	Politics
009	Theology	David F. Ford	24 Feb 2000; 24 Oct 2013 (2nd ed.)	1999	Religion
010	Archaeology	Paul Bahn (illustrator: Bill Tidy)	24 Feb 2000; 30 Aug 2012 (2nd ed.)	1996	Archaeology
011	Judaism	Norman Solomon	24 Feb 2000; 28 Aug 2014 (2nd ed.); 13 May 2026 (3rd ed.)	1996	Religion
012	Sociology	Steve Bruce	24 Feb 2000; 27 Sep 2018 (2nd ed.)	1999	Sociology
013	The Koran	Michael Cook	24 Feb 2000		Religion
014	The Bible	John Riches	24 Feb 2000; 28 Oct 2021 (2nd ed.)		Religion
015	Social and Cultural Anthropology	John Monaghan, Peter Just	24 Feb 2000		Anthropology
016	History	John Arnold	24 Feb 2000		History
017	Roman Britain	Peter Salway	10 Aug 2000; 1 Aug 2015 (2nd ed.)	Chapter from The Oxford Illustrated History of Britain, 1984	History – U.K.
018	The Anglo-Saxon Age	John Blair	10 Aug 2000	Chapter from The Oxford Illustrated History of Britain, 1984	History – U.K.
019	Medieval Britain	John Gillingham, Ralph A. Griffiths	10 Aug 2000	Chapters from The Oxford Illustrated History of Britain, 1984	History – U.K.
020	The Tudors	John Guy	10 Aug 2000; 29 Aug 2013 (2nd ed.)	Chapter from The Oxford Illustrated History of Britain, 1984	History – U.K.
021	Stuart Britain	John Morrill	10 Aug 2000	Chapter from The Oxford Illustrated History of Britain, 1984	History – U.K.
022	Eighteenth-Century Britain	Paul Langford	10 Aug 2000	Chapter from The Oxford Illustrated History of Britain, 1984	History – U.K.
023	Nineteenth-Century Britain	Christopher Harvie, H. C. G. Matthew	10 Aug 2000	Chapters from The Oxford Illustrated History of Britain, 1984	History – U.K.
024	Twentieth-Century Britain	Kenneth O. Morgan	10 Aug 2000	Chapter from The Oxford Illustrated History of Britain, 1984	History – U.K.
025	Heidegger	Michael Inwood	12 Oct 2000; 24 Jan 2019 (2nd ed.)	Past Masters series, 1997	Philosophy/Biography
026	Ancient philosophy	Julia Annas	12 Oct 2000; 23 Nov 2023 (2nd ed.)		Classical Studies/Philosophy
027	Socrates	C. C. W. Taylor	12 Oct 2000; 22 Aug 2019 (2nd ed.)	Past Masters series, 1998	Classical Studies/Philosophy/Biography
028	Marx	Peter Singer	12 Oct 2000; 22 Mar 2018 (2nd ed.)	Past Masters series, 1980	Philosophy/Politics/Biography
029	Logic	Graham Priest	12 Oct 2000; 26 Oct 2017 (2nd ed.)		Mathematics/Philosophy
030	Descartes	Tom Sorell	12 Oct 2000	Past Masters series, 1987	Philosophy/Biography
031	Machiavelli	Quentin Skinner	12 Oct 2000; 25 July 2019 (2nd ed.)	Past Masters series, 1981	Politics/Literature/History/Biography
032	Aristotle	Jonathan Barnes	12 Oct 2000	Past Masters series, 1982	Classical Studies/Philosophy/Biography
033	Hume	A. J. Ayer	12 Oct 2000	Past Masters series, 1980	Philosophy/Biography
033	Hume	James Anthony Harris	23 Sep 2021		Philosophy/Biography
034	Nietzsche	Michael Tanner	19 Oct 2000	Past Masters series, 1987	Philosophy/Biography
035	Darwin	Jonathan Howard	22 Feb 2001	Past Masters series, 1982	History of Science/Biological Sciences/Biography
036	The European Union	John Pinder, Simon Usherwood	22 Feb 2001; 13 Dec 2007 (2nd ed.); 25 July 2013 (3rd ed.); 25 Jan 2018 (4th ed.)		Politics
037	Gandhi	Bhikhu Parekh	22 Feb 2001	Past Masters series, 1997	History/Politics/Biography
038	Augustine	Henry Chadwick	22 Feb 2001	Past Masters series, 1986	Philosophy/Religion/Biography
039	Intelligence	Ian J. Deary	22 Feb 2001; 1 June 2020 (2nd ed.)		Psychology
040	Jung	Anthony Stevens	22 Feb 2001	Past Masters series, 1994	Psychology/Popular Health/Biography
041	Buddha	Michael Carrithers	22 Feb 2001	Past Masters series, 1983	Religion/Philosophy/Biography
042	Paul	E. P. Sanders	22 Feb 2001	Past Masters series, 1991	Religion/Biography
043	Continental philosophy	Simon Critchley	22 Feb 2001		Philosophy
044	Galileo	Stillman Drake	22 Feb 2001	Past Masters series, 1980	History of Science/Physics/Biography
045	Freud	Anthony Storr	22 Feb 2001	Past Masters series, 1989	Psychology/Popular Health/Biography
046	Wittgenstein	A. C. Grayling	22 Feb 2001	Past Masters series, 1988	Philosophy/Linguistics/Biography
047	Indian philosophy	Sue Hamilton	22 Feb 2001	Non-VSI, 2000	Philosophy/Religion
048	Rousseau	Robert Wokler	23 Aug 2001	Past Masters series, 1995	Philosophy/Politics/Biography
049	Hegel	Peter Singer	23 Aug 2001	Past Masters series, 1983	Philosophy/Biography
050	Kant	Roger Scruton	23 Aug 2001	Past Masters series, 1982	Philosophy/Politics/Biography
051	Cosmology	Peter Coles	23 Aug 2001		Physics
052	Drugs	Leslie Iversen	23 Aug 2001; 23 June 2016 (2nd ed.)		Medicine - Clinical/Pharmacology
053	Russian literature	Catriona Kelly	23 Aug 2001		Literature
054	The French Revolution	William Doyle	23 Aug 2001; 28 Nov 2019 (2nd ed.)		History
055	Philosophy	Edward Craig	21 Feb 2002; 24 Sep 2020 (2nd ed.)	Non-VSI, 2002	Philosophy
056	Barthes	Jonathan Culler	21 Feb 2002	Modern Masters series, Fontana Press, 1983	Literature/Biography
057	Animal rights	David DeGrazia	21 Feb 2002		Philosophy
058	Kierkegaard	Patrick Gardiner	21 Feb 2002	Past Masters series, 1988	Philosophy/Biography
059	Russell	A. C. Grayling	21 Feb 2002	Past Masters series, 1996	Philosophy/Biography
060	Shakespeare (Note: Greer, Shakespeare: ISBN 978-0-19-280249-1. Wells, William Shakespeare: ISBN 978-0-19-871862-8.)	Germaine Greer	21 Feb 2002	Past Masters series, 1986	Literature/Biography
060	William Shakespeare	Stanley Wells	23 Apr 2015		Literature/Biography
061	Clausewitz	Michael Howard	21 Feb 2002	Past Masters series, 1983	History/Politics/Biography
062	Schopenhauer	Christopher Janaway	21 Feb 2002	Past Masters series, 1994	Philosophy/Biography
063	The Russian Revolution	S. A. Smith	21 Feb 2002		History
064	Hobbes	Richard Tuck	30 May 2002	Past Masters series, 1989	Philosophy/Politics/Biography
065	World music	Philip V. Bohlman	30 May 2002; 23 July 2020 (2nd ed.)		Music
066	Mathematics	Timothy Gowers	22 Aug 2002		Philosophy/Mathematics
067	Philosophy of science	Samir Okasha	30 May 2002; 28 July 2016 (2nd ed.)		Philosophy/History of Science
068	Cryptography	Fred Piper, Sean Murphy	30 May 2002 27 Feb 2025 (2nd ed.)		Computing/Mathematics
069	Quantum Theory	John Polkinghorne	30 May 2002		Chemistry/Physics
070	Spinoza	Roger Scruton	30 May 2002	Past Masters series, 1986	Philosophy/Biography
071	Choice Theory	Michael Allingham	22 Aug 2002		Economics
072	Architecture	Andrew Ballantyne	22 Aug 2002		Architecture
073	Poststructuralism	Catherine Belsey	22 Aug 2002; 25 Nov 2022 (2nd ed.)		Philosophy
074	Postmodernism	Christopher Butler	10 Oct 2002		Philosophy
075	Democracy	Bernard Crick	10 Oct 2002		Politics/History
076	Empire	Stephen Howe	22 Aug 2002		History
077	Fascism	Kevin Passmore	22 Aug 2002; 29 May 2014 (2nd ed.)		History/Politics
078	Terrorism	Charles Townshend	10 Oct 2002; 8 Sep 2011 (2nd ed.); 24 May 2018 (3rd ed.)		Sociology/Terrorism and National Security Law/ Warfare and Defense
079	Plato	Julia Annas	13 Feb 2003		Classical Studies/Philosophy/Biography
080	Ethics	Simon Blackburn	8 May 2003; 28 Jan 2021 (2nd ed.)	Being Good: An Introduction to Ethics, 2001 rev. 2003	Philosophy
081	Emotion	Dylan Evans	13 Feb 2003; 26 Sep 2019 (2nd ed.)	Emotion: The Science of Sentiment, 2001	Anthropology/Psychology
082	Northern Ireland	Marc Mulholland	23 Jan 2003; 26 Mar 2020 (2nd ed.)	The Longest War: Northern Ireland's Troubled History, 2002	History/Human Geography
083	Art Theory	Cynthia Freeland	13 Feb 2003	But Is It Art?: An Introduction to Art Theory, 2001	Art
084	Locke	John Dunn	8 May 2003	Past Masters series, 1984	Philosophy/Biography
085	Modern Ireland	Senia Paseta	27 Mar 2003		Human Geography
086	Globalization	Manfred Steger	27 Mar 2003; 22 Jan 2009 (2nd ed.); 4 Apr 2013 (3rd ed.); 27 Apr 2017 (4th ed.); 28 May 2020 (5th ed.); 29 June 2023 (6th ed.)		Economics/Politics
087	The Cold War	Robert J. McMahon	27 Mar 2003; 25 Feb 2021 (2nd ed.)		History
088	The History of Astronomy	Michael Hoskin	8 May 2003		History of Science/Physics
089	Schizophrenia	Chris Frith, Eve C. Johnstone	22 May 2003		Psychology/Social Work
090	The Earth	Martin Redfern	26 June 2003		Earth Sciences and Geography/Environment
091	Engels	Terrell Carver	22 May 2003	Past Masters series, 1981	Politics
092	British Politics	Tony Wright	22 May 2003; 30 May 2013 (2nd ed.); 25 June 2020 (3rd ed.)		Politics – U.K.
093	Linguistics	P. H. Matthews	24 Apr 2003		Linguistics
094	The Celts	Barry Cunliffe	26 June 2003		History
095	Ideology	Michael Freeden	26 June 2003; 22 Oct 2026 (2nd ed.)		Politics
096	Prehistory	Chris Gosden	26 June 2003; 28 June 2018 (2nd ed.)		History/Archaeology/Art
097	Political philosophy	David Miller	26 June 2003		Philosophy
098	Postcolonialism	Robert J.C. Young	26 June 2003; 22 Oct 2020 (2nd ed.)		Literature
099	Atheism	Julian Baggini	26 June 2003; 26 Aug 2021 (2nd ed.)		Religion/Philosophy
100	Evolution	Brian Charlesworth, Deborah Charlesworth	26 June 2003; 6 July 2017 (2nd ed.)		Biology/Anthropology
101	Molecules	Philip Ball	27 Nov 2003	Stories of the Invisible: A Guided Tour of Molecules, 2001	Biology/Chemistry
102	Art history	Dana Arnold	22 Jan 2004; 2 Mar 2020 (2nd ed.)		Art/History
103	Presocratic Philosophy	Catherine Osborne	22 Apr 2004		Philosophy/Classical Studies
104	The Elements	Philip Ball	8 Apr 2004	The Ingredients: A Guided Tour of the Elements, 2002	Chemistry/History of Science
105	Dada and Surrealism	David Hopkins	8 Apr 2004		Art
106	Egyptian Myth	Geraldine Pinch	22 Apr 2004		Classical Studies
107	Christian art	Beth Williamson	24 June 2004		Religion/Art
108	Capitalism	James Fulcher	13 May 2004; 1 Aug 2015 (2nd ed.)		Politics/Economics
109	Particle physics	Frank Close	13 May 2004; Nov 2023 (2nd ed.)		Physics
110	Free will	Thomas Pink	24 June 2004		Philosophy
111	Myth	Robert A. Segal	8 July 2004; 1 Sep 2015 (2nd ed.)		Religion
112	Ancient Egypt	Ian Shaw	22 July 2004; 28 Jan 2021 (2nd ed.)		History
113	Hieroglyphs	Penelope Wilson	12 Aug 2004	Sacred Signs: Hieroglyphs in Ancient Egypt, 2003	Classical Studies
114	Medical ethics	Tony Hope	23 Sep 2004; 22 Nov 2018 (2nd ed.)		Philosophy/Medical Ethics
115	Kafka	Ritchie Robertson	28 Oct 2004		Literature/Biography
116	Anarchism (Note: Ward, Anarchism: ISBN 978-0-19-280477-8. Prichard, Anarchism: ISBN 978-0-19-881561-7.)	Colin Ward	21 Oct 2004		Politics
116	Anarchism	Alex Prichard	25 Nov 2022		Politics
117	Ancient warfare	Harry Sidebottom	25 Nov 2004		Classical Studies
118	Climate change	Mark Maslin	25 Nov 2004; 27 Nov 2008 (2nd ed.); 23 Oct 2014 (3rd ed.); 19 Aug 2021 (4th ed.)	In the 3rd edition the title has changed from Global warming to Climate change	Earth Sciences and Geography/Environment
119	Christianity	Linda Woodhead	25 Nov 2004; 4 Sep 2014 (2nd ed.)		Religion
120	Modern art	David Cottington	24 Feb 2005		Art
121	Consciousness	Susan Blackmore	24 Mar 2005; 14 Sep 2017 (2nd ed.)		Philosophy/Psychology
122	Foucault	Gary Gutting	24 Mar 2005; 26 Sep 2019 (2nd ed.)		Philosophy/Biography
123	The Spanish Civil War	Helen Graham	24 Mar 2005		History
124	The Marquis de Sade	John Phillips	28 July 2005		Literature/Biography
125	Habermas	Gordon Finlayson	26 May 2005		Philosophy/Sociology/Biography
126	Socialism	Michael Newman	28 July 2005; 24 Sep 2020 (2nd ed.)		Politics/Economics/History
127	Dreaming	J. Allan Hobson	21 Apr 2005	Dreaming: An Introduction to the Science of Sleep, 2002	Psychology
128	Dinosaurs	David Norman	28 July 2005; 28 Dec 2017 (2nd ed.)		Biology/Earth Sciences/Geography
129	Renaissance Art	Geraldine A. Johnson	21 Apr 2005		Art
130	Buddhist ethics	Damien Keown	23 June 2005; 25 June 2020 (2nd ed.)		Religion
131	Tragedy	Adrian Poole	11 Aug 2005		Classical Studies
132	Sikhism	Eleanor Nesbitt	22 Sep 2005; 28 Apr 2016 (2nd ed.)		Religion
133	The History of Time	Leofranc Holford-Strevens	11 Aug 2005		Science/History
134	Nationalism	Steven Grosby	8 Sep 2005		Politics
135	The World Trade Organization	Amrita Narlikar	8 Sep 2005		Economics/Politics
136	Design	John Heskett	23 June 2005	Toothpicks and Logos: Design in Everyday Life, 2002	Art
137	The Vikings	Julian D. Richards	8 Sep 2005		History
138	Fossils	Keith Thomson	13 Oct 2005		Biology/Earth Sciences/Geography
139	Journalism	Ian Hargreaves	15 Sep 2005; 28 Aug 2014 (2nd ed.)	Journalism: Truth or Dare?, 2003	Journalism/Media Studies
140	The Crusades	Christopher Tyerman	13 Oct 2005	Fighting for Christendom: Holy War and the Crusades, 2004	History/Religion
141	Feminism	Margaret Walters	27 Oct 2005		History/Philosophy/Sociology
142	Human evolution	Bernard Wood	3 Nov 2005; 27 June 2019 (2nd ed.)		Anthropology/Archaeology
143	The Dead Sea Scrolls	Timothy Lim	24 Nov 2005; 23 Mar 2017 (2nd ed.)		Religion
144	The Brain	Michael O'Shea	8 Dec 2005		Biology/Neuroscience - Clinical/Neurology/Psychology
145	Geophysical and Climate Hazards	Bill McGuire	26 Jan 2006; 28 Aug 2014 (2nd ed.); 22 May 2024 (3rd ed.)	A Guide to the End of the World: Everything You Never Wanted to Know, 2002. 1st/2nd ed. title: Global Catastrophes	Earth Sciences and Geography/Environment/Environmental Science
146	Contemporary art	Julian Stallabrass	23 Mar 2006; 10 Dec 2020 (2nd ed.)	Art Incorporated: The Story of Contemporary Art, 2004	Art
147	Philosophy of Law	Raymond Wacks	18 May 2006; 27 Feb 2014 (2nd ed.)		Philosophy/Law
148	The Renaissance	Jerry Brotton	27 Apr 2006	The Renaissance Bazaar: From the Silk Road to Michelangelo, 2002	Art/History/Philosophy
149	Anglicanism	Mark Chapman	22 June 2006		Religion
150	The Roman Empire	Christopher Kelly	24 Aug 2006		Classical Studies
151	Photography	Steven Edwards	24 Aug 2006		Art
152	Psychiatry	Tom Burns	21 Sep 2006; 25 Oct 2018 (2nd ed.)		Medicine - Psychiatry/Psychology/Social Work
153	Existentialism	Thomas Flynn	12 Oct 2006		Philosophy
154	The First World War	Michael Howard	25 Jan 2007	Non-VSI, 2002	History/Military
155	Fundamentalism	Malise Ruthven	25 Jan 2007	Fundamentalism: The Search for Meaning, 2004	Religion
156	Economics	Partha Dasgupta	22 Feb 2007		Economics
157	International Migration	Khalid Koser	22 Feb 2007; 23 June 2016 (2nd ed.)		Sociology
158	Newton	Rob Iliffe	25 Jan 2007		History of Science/Physics/Biography
159	Chaos	Lenny Smith	22 Feb 2007		Mathematics/Physics
160	African History	John Parker, Richard Rathbone	22 Mar 2007		History
161	Racism	Ali Rattansi	22 Mar 2007; 26 Mar 2020 (2nd ed.)		Sociology
162	Kabbalah	Joseph Dan	30 Aug 2007	Non-VSI, 2006	Religion
163	Human Rights	Andrew Clapham	28 June 2007; 1 Feb 2016 (2nd ed.)		Law - International/Human Rights and Immigration/Politics/Social Work
164	International Relations	Paul Wilkinson; Christian Reus-Smit	26 July 2007; 23 Apr 2020 (different author)		Economics/Politics
165	The American Presidency	Charles O. Jones	11 Oct 2007; 23 June 2016 (2nd ed.)		History – U.S./Politics – U.S.
166	The Great Depression and The New Deal	Eric Rauchway	24 Apr 2008		Economics/History
167	Classical Mythology	Helen Morales	23 Aug 2007		Classical Studies/Religion
168	The New Testament as Literature	Kyle Keefer	27 Nov 2008		Religion
169	American Political Parties and Elections	L. Sandy Maisel	27 Sep 2007; 23 June 2016 (2nd ed.); 28 July 2022 (3rd ed.)		Politics – U.S.
170	Bestsellers	John Sutherland	25 Oct 2007		Literature
171	Geopolitics	Klaus Dodds	25 Oct 2007; 26 June 2014 (2nd ed.); 25 July 2019 (3rd ed.)		Human Geography/Politics
172	Antisemitism	Steven Beller	22 Nov 2007; 1 Dec 2015 (2nd ed.)		History/Religion
173	Game theory	Ken Binmore	25 Oct 2007		Economics
174	HIV/AIDS	Alan Whiteside	24 Jan 2008; 24 Nov 2016 (2nd ed.)		Medicine - Clinical/Pathology
175	Documentary film	Patricia Aufderheide	24 Jan 2008; 6 Apr 2026 (2nd ed.)		Media Studies
176	Modern China	Rana Mitter	28 Feb 2008; 1 Apr 2016 (2nd ed.) 11 Aug 2025 (3rd ed.)		Human Geography
177	The Quakers	Pink Dandelion	28 Feb 2008		Religion
178	German literature	Nicholas Boyle	28 Feb 2008		Literature
179	Nuclear Weapons	Joseph M. Siracusa	20 Mar 2008; 23 Apr 2015 (2nd ed.); 24 Sep 2020 (3rd ed.)		Physics/Politics/Warfare And Defence
180	Law	Raymond Wacks	27 Mar 2008; 1 Feb 2016 (2nd ed.); 25 May 2023 (3rd ed.)		Law/History/Law and Society/Legal System and Practice
181	The Old Testament	Michael Coogan	22 May 2008		Religion
182	Galaxies	John Gribbin	27 Mar 2008		Physics
183	Mormonism	Richard Bushman	26 June 2008		Religion
184	Religion in America	Timothy Beal	25 Sep 2008		Religion
185	Geography	John A. Matthews, David T. Herbert	22 May 2008		Earth Sciences and Geography/History/Human Geography
186	The Meaning of Life	Terry Eagleton	24 Apr 2008	Non-VSI, 2007	Religion/Philosophy
187	Sexuality	Veronique Mottier	24 Apr 2008		Sociology/Psychology/Medicine/History
188	Nelson Mandela	Elleke Boehmer	17 July 2008; 10 Oct 2023 (2nd ed.)		History/Politics/Biography
189	Science and Religion	Thomas Dixon, Adam Shapiro	24 July 2008; 24 Feb 2022 (2nd ed.)		Religion/Philosophy
190	Relativity	Russell Stannard	24 July 2008		Physics
191	The History of Medicine	William Bynum	31 July 2008		History of Medicine
192	Citizenship	Richard Bellamy	25 Sep 2008		Politics
193	The History of Life	Michael J. Benton	27 Nov 2008; 27 Aug 2026 (2nd ed.)		Biology/Earth Sciences and Geography
194	Memory	Jonathan K. Foster	6 Nov 2008; 9 Jan 2026 (2nd ed.)		Neuroscience/Psychology
195	Autism	Uta Frith	23 Oct 2008		Neuroscience/Psychology
196	Statistics	David J. Hand	23 Oct 2008		Mathematics
197	Scotland	Rab Houston	27 Nov 2008		History/Human Geography
198	Catholicism	Gerald O'Collins	27 Nov 2008; 25 May 2017 (2nd ed.)		Religion
199	The United Nations	Jussi M. Hanhimäki	30 Oct 2008; 2 June 2015 (2nd ed.)		Politics
200	Free speech	Nigel Warburton	26 Feb 2009		Politics
201	The Apocryphal Gospels	Paul Foster	26 Feb 2009		Religion
202	Modern Japan	Christopher Goto-Jones	23 Apr 2009		Human Geography
203	Lincoln	Allen C. Guelzo	26 Feb 2009		History – U.S./Biography
204	Superconductivity	Stephen J. Blundell	28 May 2009		Physics
205	Nothing	Frank Close	25 June 2009	The Void, 2007	
206	Biography	Hermione Lee	9 July 2009		Literature
207	The Soviet Union	Stephen Lovell	23 July 2009		History/Politics
208	Writing and Script	Andrew Robinson	27 Aug 2009		Literature
209	Communism	Leslie Holmes	27 Aug 2009		Politics
210	Fashion	Rebecca Arnold	22 Oct 2009		Art
211	Forensic science	Jim Fraser	25 Feb 2010; 20 Feb 2020 (2nd ed.)		Science
212	Puritanism	Francis J. Bremer	24 Sep 2009		Religion
213	The Reformation	Peter Marshall	22 Oct 2009; 19 Sep 2025 (2nd ed.)		Religion
214	Thomas Aquinas	Fergus Kerr	5 Nov 2009		Religion/Biography
215	Deserts	Nick Middleton	26 Nov 2009		Geography
216	The Norman Conquest	George Garnett	26 Nov 2009		History – U.K.
217	Biblical archaeology	Eric H. Cline	26 Nov 2009		History/Archaeology
218	The Reagan Revolution	Gil Troy	3 Dec 2009		History – U.S.
219	The Book of Mormon	Terryl Givens	21 Jan 2010		Religion
220	Islamic History	Adam J. Silverstein	21 Jan 2010		History/Religion
221	Privacy	Raymond Wacks	21 Jan 2010; 26 Mar 2015 (2nd ed.)		Politics
222	Neoliberalism	Manfred Steger, Ravi K. Roy	21 Jan 2010; 28 Jan 2021 (2nd ed.)		Politics
223	Progressivism	Walter Nugent	25 Feb 2010		Politics
224	Epidemiology	Rodolfo Saracci	25 Feb 2010		Medicine
225	Information	Luciano Floridi	25 Feb 2010		
226	The Laws of Thermodynamics	Peter Atkins	25 Mar 2010	Four Laws That Drive the Universe, 2007	Physics
227	Innovation	Mark Dodgson, David Gann	25 Mar 2010; 23 Aug 2018 (2nd ed.)		Science/Business
228	Witchcraft	Malcolm Gaskill	25 Mar 2010		Religion
229	The New Testament	Luke Timothy Johnson	22 Apr 2010		Religion
230	French literature	John D. Lyons	22 Apr 2010		Literature
231	Film music	Kathryn Kalinak	27 May 2010; Nov 2023 (2nd ed.)		Music
232	Druids	Barry Cunliffe	27 May 2010		Religion
233	German philosophy	Andrew Bowie	27 May 2010		Philosophy
234	Advertising	Winston Fletcher	24 June 2010		Business
235	Forensic psychology	David Canter	17 June 2010		Psychology
236	Modernism	Christopher Butler	29 July 2010		Literature
237	Leadership	Keith Grint	29 July 2010		Business/Psychology
238	Christian ethics	D. Stephen Long	29 July 2010		Religion
239	Tocqueville	Harvey Mansfield	24 June 2010		Politics/Biography
240	Landscapes and Geomorphology	Andrew Goudie, Heather Viles	26 Aug 2010		Geology
241	Spanish Literature	Jo Labanyi	26 Aug 2010		Literature
242	Diplomacy	Joseph M. Siracusa	26 Aug 2010; 6 July 2021 (2nd ed.)	For the second edition the title has changed to Diplomatic History	Politics/History
243	North American Indians	Theda Perdue, Michael D. Green	26 Aug 2010		History/Archaeology
244	The U.S. Congress	Donald Ritchie	10 June 2010; 22 Sep 2016 (2nd ed.); 22 Dec 2022 (3rd ed.)		Politics – U.S.
245	Romanticism	Michael Ferber	23 Sep 2010		Literature
246	Utopianism	Lyman Tower Sargent	23 Sep 2010		Literature/Philosophy
247	The Blues	Elijah Wald	24 June 2010		Music
248	Keynes	Robert Skidelsky	7 Oct 2010		History of Science/Economics/Biography
249	English literature	Jonathan Bate	7 Oct 2010		Literature
250	Agnosticism	Robin Le Poidevin	28 Oct 2010		Religion
251	Aristocracy	William Doyle	25 Nov 2010		Politics/History
252	Martin Luther	Scott H. Hendrix	21 Oct 2010		Religion/Biography
253	Michael Faraday	Frank A.J.L. James	25 Nov 2010		History of Science/Physics/Biography
254	Planets	David A. Rothery	25 Nov 2010		Astronomy
255	Pentecostalism	William K. Kay	27 Jan 2011		Religion
256	Humanism	Stephen Law	27 Jan 2011		Religion/Philosophy
257	Folk music	Mark Slobin	24 Feb 2011		Music
258	Late Antiquity	Gillian Clark	24 Feb 2011		Classical Studies
259	Genius	Andrew Robinson	24 Feb 2011		Psychology
260	Numbers	Peter M. Higgins	24 Feb 2011		Mathematics
261	Muhammad	Jonathan A.C. Brown	24 Mar 2011		Religion/Biography
262	Beauty	Roger Scruton	24 Mar 2011	Non-VSI, 2009	Philosophy/Art
263	Critical theory	Stephen Eric Bronner	5 May 2011; 26 Oct 2017 (2nd ed.)		Literature/Philosophy
264	Organizations	Mary Jo Hatch	24 Mar 2011		Business
265	Early Music	Thomas Forrest Kelly	9 June 2011		Music
266	The Scientific Revolution	Lawrence M. Principe	28 Apr 2011		History of Science
267	Cancer	Nick James	26 May 2011 23 Jan 2025 (2nd ed.)		Medicine
268	Nuclear power	Maxwell Irvine	26 May 2011		Physics
269	Paganism	Owen Davies	26 May 2011		Religion
270	Risk	Baruch Fischhoff, John Kadvany	26 May 2011		
271	Science fiction	David Seed	23 June 2011		Literature
272	Herodotus	Jennifer T. Roberts	23 June 2011		Classical Studies
273	Conscience	Paul Strohm	23 June 2011		Philosophy/Ethics/Psychology
274	American Immigration	David A. Gerber	23 June 2011		History – U.S./Sociology
275	Jesus	Richard Bauckham	28 July 2011		Religion/Biography
276	Viruses	Dorothy H. Crawford	28 July 2011; 22 Mar 2018 (2nd ed.); 20 Oct 2022 (3rd ed.)		Biology
277	Protestantism	Mark A. Noll	25 Aug 2011		Religion
278	Derrida	Simon Glendinning	25 Aug 2011; 26 July 2026 (2nd ed.)		Literature/Philosophy/Biography
279	Madness	Andrew T. Scull	25 Aug 2011		Psychology
280	Developmental biology	Lewis Wolpert	25 Aug 2011		Biology
281	Dictionaries	Lynda Mugglestone	18 Aug 2011		Literature
282	Global Economic History	Robert C. Allen	15 Sep 2011; 13 Mar 2026 (2nd ed.)		History/Economics
283	Multiculturalism	Ali Rattansi	22 Sep 2011		Sociology
284	Environmental economics	Stephen Smith	22 Sep 2011		Economics
285	The Cell	Terence Allen, Graham Cowling	29 Sep 2011		Biology
286	Ancient Greece	Paul Cartledge	27 Oct 2011		Classical Studies
287	Angels	David Albert Jones	27 Oct 2011		Religion
288	Children's literature	Kimberley Reynolds	6 Oct 2011		Literature
289	The Periodic Table	Eric R. Scerri	27 Oct 2011; 25 July 2019 (2nd ed.)		Chemistry
290	Modern France	Vanessa R. Schwartz	27 Oct 2011		Human Geography
291	Reality	Jan Westerhoff	24 Nov 2011		Philosophy
292	The Computer	Darrel Ince	24 Nov 2011		Computing/Mathematics/Engineering/Science
293	The Animal Kingdom	Peter Holland	24 Nov 2011		Biology
294	Colonial Latin American Literature	Rolena Adorno	24 Nov 2011		Literature
295	Sleep	Steven W. Lockley, Russell G. Foster	22 Mar 2012		Medicine
296	The Aztecs	David Carrasco	26 Jan 2012		History
297	The Cultural Revolution	Richard Curt Kraus	26 Jan 2012		History/Politics
298	Modern Latin American Literature	Roberto González Echevarría	26 Jan 2012		Literature
299	Magic	Owen Davies	26 Jan 2012		Religion
300	Film	Michael Wood	26 Jan 2012		Cinema
301	The Conquistadors	Matthew Restall, Felipe Fernández-Armesto	23 Feb 2012		History
302	Chinese literature	Sabina Knight	23 Feb 2012		Literature
303	Stem Cells	Jonathan Slack	23 Feb 2012; 23 Sep 2021 (2nd ed.)		Biology
304	Italian literature	Peter Hainsworth, David Robey	23 Feb 2012		Literature
305	The History of Mathematics	Jacqueline Stedall	23 Feb 2012		Mathematics/History of Science
306	The U.S. Supreme Court	Linda Greenhouse	22 Mar 2012; 23 July 2020 (2nd ed.); 28 Sep 2023 (3rd ed.)		Politics – U.S.
307	Plague	Paul Slack	22 Mar 2012; 24 June 2021 (2nd ed.)		Medicine/History
308	Russian History	Geoffrey Hosking	29 Mar 2012		History
309	Engineering	David Blockley	22 Mar 2012		Engineering
310	Probability	John Haigh	26 Apr 2012		Mathematics
311	Rivers	Nick Middleton	26 Apr 2012		Geography
312	Plants	Timothy Walker	26 Apr 2012		Biology
313	Anaesthesia	Aidan O'Donnell	26 Apr 2012		Medicine
314	The Mongols	Morris Rossabi	26 Apr 2012		History
315	The Devil	Darren Oldridge	31 May 2012		Religion
316	Objectivity	Stephen Gaukroger	24 May 2012		Philosophy
317	Magnetism	Stephen J. Blundell	28 June 2012		Physics
318	Anxiety	Daniel Freeman, Jason Freeman	31 May 2012		Psychology
319	Australia	Kenneth Morgan	31 May 2012		Geography
320	Languages	Stephen Anderson	28 June 2012		Linguistics
321	Magna Carta	Nicholas Vincent	28 June 2012		Politics
322	Stars	Andrew King	26 July 2012		Astronomy
323	The Antarctic	Klaus Dodds	26 July 2012		Geography
324	Radioactivity	Claudio Tuniz	26 July 2012		Physics
325	Trust	Katherine Hawley	23 Aug 2012		Politics
326	Metaphysics	Stephen Mumford	30 Aug 2012		Philosophy
327	The Roman Republic	David M. Gwynn	30 Aug 2012		Classical Studies
328	Borders	Alexander C. Diener, Joshua Hagen	27 Sep 2012; 21 Mar 2024 (2nd ed.)		Politics
329	The Gothic	Nick Groom	27 Sep 2012		Literature
330	Robotics	Alan Winfield	27 Sep 2012		Engineering/Science
331	Civil engineering	David Muir Wood	27 Sep 2012		Engineering
332	The Orchestra	D. Kern Holoman	25 Oct 2012		Music
333	Governance	Mark Bevir	25 Oct 2012		Politics
334	American History	Paul S. Boyer	9 Aug 2012		History – U.S.
335	Networks	Guido Caldarelli, Michele Catanzaro	25 Oct 2012		Computing/Mathematics/Engineering/Science
336	Spirituality	Philip Sheldrake	29 Nov 2012		Religion
337	Work	Stephen Fineman	29 Nov 2012		Economics
338	Martyrdom	Jolyon Mitchell	29 Nov 2012		Religion
339	Colonial America	Alan Taylor	29 Nov 2012		history – U.S.
340	Rastafari	Ennis B. Edmonds	20 Dec 2012		Religion
341	Comedy	Matthew Bevis	20 Dec 2012		Literature
342	The Avant-Garde	David Cottington	31 Jan 2013		Art
343	Thought	Tim Bayne	31 Jan 2013		Psychology
344	The Napoleonic Wars	Mike Rapport	31 Jan 2013		History/Military
345	Medical law	Charles Foster	28 Feb 2013		Medicine/Law
346	Rhetoric	Richard Toye	28 Mar 2013		Classical Studies
347	Education	Gary Thomas	28 Mar 2013; 23 Sep 2021 (2nd ed.)		Education
348	Mao	Delia Davin	25 Apr 2013		Politics – China/Biography
349	The British Constitution	Martin Loughlin	25 Apr 2013; 26 Oct 2023 (2nd ed.)		Politics – U.K.
350	American politics	Richard M. Valelly	28 Mar 2013		Politics – U.S.
351	The Silk Road	James A. Millward	26 Apr 2013		History
352	Bacteria	Sebastian G. B. Amyes	30 May 2013; 23 June 2022 (2nd ed.)		Biology
353	Symmetry	Ian Stewart	30 May 2013		Mathematics
354	Marine biology	Philip V. Mladenov	26 Sep 2013; 1 May 2020 (2nd ed.)		Biology
355	The British Empire	Ashley Jackson	30 May 2013		History – U.K.
356	The Trojan War	Eric H. Cline	30 May 2013		History/Archaeology/Classical Studies
357	Malthus	Donald Winch	27 June 2013		Sociology/Biography
358	Climate	Mark Maslin	27 June 2013; 22 Oct 2026 (2nd ed.)		Science
359	The Palestinian–Israeli Conflict	Martin Bunton	29 Aug 2013		Politics/History
360	Happiness	Daniel M. Haybron	29 Aug 2013		Psychology
361	Diaspora	Kevin Kenny	25 July 2013		Sociology/History/Politics
362	Contemporary Fiction	Robert Eaglestone	25 July 2013		Literature
363	Modern War	Richard English	25 July 2013		Military
364	The Beats	David Sterritt	25 July 2013		Literature/History
365	Sociolinguistics	John Edwards	25 July 2013		Linguistics
366	Food	John Krebs	26 Sep 2013		
367	Fractals	Kenneth Falconer	26 Sep 2013		Mathematics
368	Management	John Hendry	24 Oct 2013		Business
369	International security	Christopher S. Browning	24 Oct 2013		Politics
370	Astrobiology	David C. Catling	24 Oct 2013		Biology
371	Causation	Stephen Mumford, Rani Lill Anjum	28 Nov 2013		Philosophy
372	Entrepreneurship	Paul Westhead, Mike Wright	28 Nov 2013		Business
373	Tibetan Buddhism	Matthew T. Kapstein	24 Oct 2013		Religion
374	The Ancient Near East	Amanda H. Podany	26 Dec 2013		History/Archaeology
375	American Legal History	G. Edward White	28 Nov 2013		Law/History – U.S.
376	Ethnomusicology	Timothy Rice	23 Jan 2014		Music
377	African Religions	Jacob K. Olupona	13 Mar 2014		Religion
378	Humour	Noël Carroll	23 Jan 2014		Philosophy
379	Family law	Jonathan Herring	27 Feb 2014		Law – U.K.
380	The Ice Age	Jamie Woodward	30 Jan 2014		Geology
381	Revolutions	Jack A. Goldstone	26 Dec 2013; 28 Dec 2023 (2nd ed.)		Politics
382	Classical Literature	William Allan	27 Mar 2014		Classical Studies
383	Accounting	Christopher Nobes	27 Mar 2014		Business
384	Teeth	Peter S. Ungar	27 Mar 2014		Biology
385	Physical chemistry	Peter Atkins	24 Apr 2014		Chemistry
386	Microeconomics	Avinash Dixit	24 Apr 2014		Economics
387	Landscape architecture	Ian Thompson	29 May 2014		Architecture
388	The Eye	Michael F. Land	29 May 2014		Biology
389	The Etruscans	Christopher Smith	29 May 2014		Classical Studies
390	Nutrition	David Bender	26 June 2014		Medicine
391	Coral Reefs	Charles Sheppard	26 June 2014; 22 Apr 2021 (2nd ed.)		Biology
392	Complexity	John H. Holland	24 July 2014		Science
393	Alexander the Great	Hugh Bowden	24 July 2014		Classical Studies/History/Biography
394	Hormones	Martin Luck	24 July 2014		Medicine
395	Confucianism	Daniel K. Gardner	26 June 2014		Religion/Philosophy
396	American Slavery	Heather Andrea Williams	25 Sep 2014		History – U.S.
397	African American Religion	Eddie S. Glaude Jr.	28 Aug 2014		Religion
398	God	John Bowker	25 Sep 2014		Religion/Philosophy
399	Genes	Jonathan Slack	25 Sep 2014; 27 Apr 2023 (2nd ed.)		Biology
400	Knowledge	Jennifer Nagel	25 Sep 2014		Philosophy
401	Structural engineering	David Blockley	25 Sep 2014		Engineering
402	Theatre	Marvin Carlson	23 Oct 2014		Art
403	Ancient Egyptian Art and Architecture	Christina Riggs	23 Oct 2014		Art
404	The Middle Ages	Miri Rubin	23 Oct 2014		History
405	Materials	Christopher Hall	23 Oct 2014		Engineering
406	Minerals	David Vaughan	23 Oct 2014		Geology
407	Peace	Oliver P. Richmond	27 Nov 2014; 23 Feb 2023 (2nd ed.)		Politics
408	Iran	Ali Ansari	27 Nov 2014		History - Iran/Human Geography
409	World War II	Gerhard L. Weinberg	13 Nov 2014		Military
410	Child Psychology	Usha Goswami	27 Nov 2014		Psychology
411	Sport	Mike Cronin	27 Nov 2014		Sport
412	Exploration	Stewart A. Weaver	12 Mar 2015		History
413	Microbiology	Nicholas P. Money	4 Dec 2014		Biology
414	Corporate social responsibility	Jeremy Moon	11 Dec 2014		Business
415	Love	Ronald de Sousa	8 Jan 2015		Philosophy
416	Psychotherapy	Tom Burns (Author), Eva Burns-Lundgren (Editor)	22 Jan 2015		Psychology
417	Chemistry	Peter Atkins	26 Feb 2015		Chemistry
418	Human Anatomy	Leslie Klenerman	26 Feb 2015		Medicine
419	The American West	Stephen Aron	11 Dec 2014		History – U.S.
420	American Political History	Donald Critchlow	25 Dec 2014		History – U.S./Politics
421	Ritual	Barry Stephenson	22 Jan 2015		Religion
422	American Women's History	Susan Ware	22 Jan 2015		History – U.S.
423	Dante	Peter Hainsworth, David Robey	26 Feb 2015		Literature/Biography
424	Ancient Assyria	Karen Radner	26 Mar 2015		History
425	Plate tectonics	Peter Molnar	26 Mar 2015		Geology
426	Corruption	Leslie Holmes	23 Apr 2015		Law
427	Pilgrimage	Ian Reader	23 Apr 2015		Religion
428	Taxation	Stephen Smith	23 Apr 2015		Economics
429	Crime Fiction	Richard Bradford	28 May 2015		Literature
430	Microscopy	Terence Allen	1 Aug 2015		Science
431	Forests	Jaboury Ghazoul	1 Aug 2015		Biology
432	Social work	Stanley Wells	1 Aug 2015		Sociology
433	Infectious Disease	Benjamin Bolker and Marta Wayne	1 Aug 2015; 26 Oct 2023 (2nd ed.)		Medicine
434	Liberalism	Michael Freeden	1 Aug 2015		Politics
435	Psychoanalysis	Daniel Pick	1 Nov 2015		Psychology
436	The American Revolution	Robert J. Allison	31 July 2015		History – U.S.
437	Byzantium	Peter Sarris	1 Oct 2015		History
438	Nuclear Physics	Frank Close	1 Oct 2015		Physics
439	Social Psychology	Richard J. Crisp	1 Nov 2015		Psychology
440	Water	John Finney	1 Nov 2015		Chemistry
441	Criminal Justice	Julian V. Roberts	1 Nov 2015; 20 Apr 2026 (2nd ed.)		Law
442	Medieval Literature	Elaine Treharne	1 Dec 2015		Literature
443	The Enlightenment	John Robertson	1 Dec 2015		History
444	Mountains	Martin F. Price	1 Dec 2015		Geography
445	Philosophy in the Islamic World	Peter Adamson	1 Nov 2015		Religion/Philosophy
446	Light	Ian A. Walmsley	1 Dec 2015		Physics
447	Algebra	Peter M. Higgins	1 Dec 2015		Mathematics
448	Hermeneutics	Jens Zimmermann	15 Dec 2015		Literature/Philosophy
449	International law	Vaughan Lowe	1 Feb 2016		Law
450	Moons	David Rothery	1 Jan 2016		Astronomy
451	Sound	Mike Goldsmith	10 Feb 2016		Physics
452	Epicureanism	Catherine Wilson	1 Feb 2016		Classical Studies
453	Black holes	Katherine Blundell	1 Feb 2016		Physics
454	The Body	Chris Shilling	1 Mar 2016		Sociology
455	Fungi	Nicolas P. Money	1 Apr 2016		Biology
456	The History of Chemistry	William H. Brock	1 Apr 2016		History of Science/Chemistry
457	Environmental Politics	Andrew Dobson	1 Mar 2016		Politics
458	Modern Drama	Kirsten E. Shepherd-Barr	1 May 2016		Literature
459	The Mexican Revolution	Alan Knight	1 Apr 2016		History - Mexico
460	The Founding Fathers	Richard B. Bernstein	14 Dec 2015		History – U.S.
461	Hollywood	Peter Decherney	27 Jan 2016		Cinema
462	Goethe	Ritchie Robertson	1 Apr 2016		Literature/Biography
463	Medieval Philosophy	John Marenbon	1 Apr 2016		Philosophy
464	Earth System Science	Tim Lenton	25 Feb 2016		Science
465	Slang	Jonathon Green	25 Feb 2016		Linguistics
466	Computer Science	Subrata Dasgupta	24 Mar 2016		Computing/Mathematics/science
467	Shakespeare's Comedies	Bart Van Es	24 Mar 2016		Literature
468	The Welfare State	David Garland	24 Mar 2016		Politics
469	Crystallography	A. M. Glazer	24 Mar 2016		Chemistry
470	Astrophysics	James Binney	24 Mar 2016		Physics
471	The BRICS	Andrew F. Cooper	28 Apr 2016		Politics/International relations
472	Decolonization	Dane Kennedy	28 Apr 2016		History
473	Agriculture	Paul Brassley, Richard Soffe	28 Apr 2016		Agriculture/History
474	Combinatorics	Robin Wilson	28 Apr 2016		Mathematics
475	Adolescence	Peter Smith	26 May 2016		Psychology
476	Isotopes	Rob Ellam	19 May 2016		Chemistry
477	Savannas	Peter Furley	23 June 2016		Geography
478	The Hebrew Bible As Literature	Tod Linafelt	3 Mar 2016		Religion
479	The Harlem Renaissance	Cheryl A. Wall	25 Aug 2016		History – U.S.
480	Babylonia	Trevor Bryce	22 Sep 2016		Classical Studies
481	Learning	Mark Haselgrove	28 July 2016		Education
482	Public health	Virginia Berridge	28 July 2016		Medicine
483	Indian Cinema	Ashish Rajadhyaska	28 July 2016		Cinema
484	Public Administration	Stella Z. Theodoulou, Ravi K. Roy	25 Aug 2016		Politics
485	Molecular Biology	Aysha Divan, Janice Royds	25 Aug 2016		Biology
486	Blood	Christopher Cooper	22 Sep 2016		Biology
487	Copernicus	Owen Gingerich	11 Aug 2016		History of Science/Science/Biography
488	Military Justice	Eugene R. Fidell	27 Oct 2016		Law
489	Cognitive Neuroscience	Richard Passingham	22 Sep 2016		Neuroscience/Psychology
490	Leibniz	Maria Rosa Antognazza	22 Sep 2016		Philosophy/Biography
491	War and Technology	Alex Roland	27 Oct 2016		Military/Engineering
492	Pandemics	Christian W. McMillen	8 Dec 2016; 25 July 2024 (2nd ed.)		Medicine
493	Translation	Matthew Reynolds	27 Oct 2016		Linguistics
494	Modern Italy	Anna Cento Bull	27 Oct 2016		Human Geography
495	Eugenics	Philippa Levine	26 Jan 2017		History of Science
496	Ageing	Nancy Pachana	24 Nov 2016		Medicine
497	Asian American History	Madeline Y. Hsu	26 Jan 2017; 9 Dec 2025 (2nd ed.)		History – U.S.
498	Home	Michael Allen Fox	8 Dec 2016		
499	Calvinism	Jon Balserak	8 Dec 2016; 11 May 2026 (2nd ed.)		Religion
500	Measurement	David J. Hand	6 Oct 2016		Science
501	Telescopes	Geoffrey Cottrell	8 Dec 2016; 25 May 2023 (2nd ed. as Observational Astronomy)		Science
502	Rocks	Jan Zalasiewicz	8 Dec 2016		Geology
503	Banking	John O. S. Wilson, John Goddard	8 Dec 2016		Economics
504	Depression	Mary Jane Tacchi, Jan Scott	26 Jan 2017		Psychology
505	Behavioural Economics	Michelle Baddeley	26 Jan 2017		Economics
506	Weather	Storm Dunlop	26 Jan 2017		Science
507	Zionism	Michael Stanislawski	8 Dec 2016		Religion
508	Intellectual property	Siva Vaidhyanathan	23 Mar 2017		Law
509	The Industrial Revolution	Robert C. Allen	23 Feb 2017		History
510	Populism	Cas Mudde, Cristsbal Rovia Kalwasser	23 Feb 2017		Politics
511	Voltaire	Nicholas Cronk	23 Feb 2017		Literature/Biography
512	Gravity	Timothy Clifton	23 Feb 2017		Physics
513	Animal Behaviour	Tristram D. Wyatt	23 Feb 2017		Biology
514	Navigation	Jim Bennett	23 Feb 2017		Science/History
515	The Habsburg Empire	Martyn Rady	23 Mar 2017		History
516	The Future	Jennifer Gidley	23 Mar 2017		Futures Studies
517	Circadian Rhythms	Russell Foster, Leon Kreitzman	23 Mar 2017		Biology
518	The Atmosphere	Paul Palmer	23 Mar 2017		Science
519	Infinity	Ian Stewart	23 Mar 2017		Mathematics
520	Organic Chemistry	Graham Patrick	23 Mar 2017		Chemistry
521	Clinical Psychology	Susan Llewellyn, Katie Aafjes-van Doorn	27 Apr 2017		Psychology
522	Shakespeare's Tragedies	Stanley Wells	27 Apr 2017		Literature
523	Military Strategy	Antulio Joseph Echevarria	23 Feb 2017; 27 June 2024 (2nd ed.)		Military
524	European Union Law	Anthony Arnull	25 May 2017		Law
525	Multilingualism	John C. Maher	25 May 2017		Linguistics
526	Jewish History	David N. Myers	25 May 2017		History
527	Branding	Robert Jones	22 June 2017		Business
528	Pain	Rob Boddice	27 July 2017		Biology
529	Oceans	Dorrik Stow	27 July 2017		Geography
530	Utilitarianism	Katarzyna de Lazari-Radek, Peter Singer	27 July 2017		Philosophy
531	Freemasonry	Andreas Önnerfors	24 Aug 2017		History
532	Heredity	John Waller	24 Aug 2017		Biology
533	Thinking and Reasoning	Jonathan Evans	28 Sep 2017		Psychology
534	Shakespeare's Sonnets and Poems	Jonathan F. S. Post	28 Sep 2017		Literature
535	Mammals	T. S. Kemp	28 Sep 2017		Biology
536	Environmental Law	Elizabeth Fisher	26 Oct 2017		Law
537	Projects	Andrew Davies	26 Oct 2017		Business
538	Perception	Brian J. Rogers	26 Oct 2017		Psychology
539	Big Data	Dawn E. Holmes	23 Nov 2017		Computing/Mathematics
540	Modern India	Craig Jeffrey	23 Nov 2017		Human Geography
541	Miracles	Yujin Nagasawa	23 Nov 2017		Religion
542	Analytic Philosophy	Michael Beaney	23 Nov 2017		Philosophy
543	The History of Cinema	Geoffrey Nowell-Smith	23 Nov 2017		Cinema
544	The Immune System	Paul Klenerman	30 Nov 2017; 14 Aug 2025 (2nd ed.)		Medicine
545	Universities and Colleges	David Palfreyman, Paul Temple	28 Dec 2017		Education
546	Monasticism	Stephen J. Davis	25 Jan 2018		Religion
547	Lakes	Warwick F. Vincent	25 Jan 2018		Geography
548	The Hellenistic Age	Peter Thonemann	22 Feb 2018		Classical Studies
549	The History of Physics	J. L. Heilbron	25 Jan 2018		History of Science/Physics
550	Fairy Tale	Marina Warner	22 Feb 2018		Literature
551	The English Language	Simon Horobin	25 Jan 2018		Linguistics
552	Philosophy of Religion	Tim Bayne	22 Feb 2018		Philosophy/Religion
553	Organized Crime	Georgios A. Antonopoulos, Georgios Papanicolaou	22 Feb 2018		Criminology
554	Veterinary Science	James Yeates	22 Feb 2018		Science
555	Applied mathematics	Alain Goriely	22 Feb 2018		Mathematics
556	Comparative Literature	Ben Hutchinson	22 Mar 2018		Literature
557	Development	Ian Goldin	22 Mar 2018		Economics
558	Anthropocene	Erle C. Ellis	22 Mar 2018		Science
559	Genomics	John M. Archibald	22 Mar 2018		Biology
560	Geophysics	William Lowrie	22 Mar 2018		Physics
561	Native American Literature	Sean Teuton	19 Jan 2018		Literature
562	Southeast Asia	James R. Rush	24 May 2018		Geography
563	Criminology	Tim Newburn	26 Apr 2018		Criminology
564	American Naval History	Craig L. Symonds	24 May 2018		History – U.S./Military
565	Demography	Sarah Harper	24 May 2018		Human Geography/Sociology
566	The U.S. Constitution	David J. Bodenhamer	8 June 2018		Law – U.S.
567	Decadence	David Weir	22 Mar 2018		Literature
568	Sexual Selection	Marlene Zuk, Leigh W Simmons	23 Aug 2018		Biology
569	The Holy Roman Empire	Joachim Whaley	26 July 2018		History
570	Stoicism	Brad Inwood	26 July 2018		Philosophy
571	Poverty	Philip N. Jefferson	26 July 2018		Economics
572	Autobiography	Laura Marcus	26 July 2018		Literature
573	Synthetic Biology	Jamie A. Davies	26 July 2018		Biology
574	Geology	Jan Zalasiewicz	26 July 2018		Geology
575	Artificial Intelligence	Margaret A. Boden	23 Aug 2018		Computing/Mathematics
576	The Book of Common Prayer	Brian Cummings	23 Aug 2018		Religion
577	American Cultural History	Eric Avila	25 Oct 2018		History – U.S.
578	Abolitionism	Richard S. Newman	6 Sep 2018		History
579	The Psychology of Music	Elizabeth Hellmuth Margulis	27 Dec 2018		Music/Psychology
580	Saints	Simon Yarrow	20 Sep 2018		Religion
581	African Politics	Ian Taylor	27 Sep 2018		Politics/History
582	Adam Smith	Christopher J. Berry	25 Oct 2018		Economics/Philosophy/Biography
583	Glaciation	David J. A. Evans	25 Oct 2018		Geology
584	Typography	Paul Luna	22 Nov 2018		Art
585	Environmental ethics	Robin Attfield	13 Dec 2018		Philosophy
586	Napoleon	David A. Bell	22 Nov 2018		History/Military/Biography
587	Modern architecture	Adam Sharr	22 Nov 2018		Architecture
588	Biometrics	Michael Fairhurst	20 Nov 2018		Computing/Mathematics
589	The History of Childhood	James Marten	25 Oct 2018		History
590	Waves	Mike Goldsmith	22 Nov 2018		Physics
591	C. S. Lewis	James Como	24 Jan 2019		Literature/Biography
592	Mathematical finance	Mark H. A. Davis	24 Jan 2019		Economics
593	Identity	Florian Coulmas	28 Feb 2019		Sociology
594	Charles Dickens	Jenny Hartley	28 Feb 2019		Literature/Biography
595	Garden History	Gordon Campbell	15 Feb 2019		History
596	Reptiles	Tom Kemp	24 Jan 2019		Biology
597	Film Noir	James Naremore	28 Feb 2019		Cinema
598	Homer	Barbara Graziosi	28 Mar 2019	Homer, 2016	Classical Studies/Biography
599	Matter	Geoff Cottrell	28 Mar 2019		Physics
600	Reading	Belinda Jack	18 Apr 2019		Literature
601	Concentration Camps	Dan Stone	28 Mar 2019	Concentration Camps: A Short History, 2017	History
602	Methodism	William J. Abraham	25 Apr 2019		Religion
603	Dyslexia	Margaret J. Snowling	23 May 2019		Psychology
604	Leo Tolstoy	Liza Knapp	24 May 2019		Literature/Biography
605	Extinction	Paul B. Wignall	27 June 2019		Biology
606	Physics	Sidney Perkowitz	25 July 2019		Physics
607	The Treaty of Versailles	Michael S. Neiberg	25 Apr 2019		History
608	Synaesthesia	Julia Simner	27 June 2019		Psychology
609	American Foreign Relations	Andrew Preston	25 July 2019		Politics/History – U.S.
610	Secularism	Andrew Copson	11 July 2019	Secularism: Politics, Religion, and Freedom, 2017	Religion
611	Geoffrey Chaucer	David Wallace	22 Aug 2019	Geoffrey Chaucer: A New Introduction, 2017	Literature/Biography
612	Nazi Germany	Jane Caplan	25 July 2019		History
613	Scepticism	Duncan Pritchard	26 Sep 2019		Philosophy/Religion
614	Poetry	Bernard O'Donoghue	26 Sep 2019		Literature
615	Orthodox Christianity	A. Edward Siecienski	22 Aug 2019		Religion
616	Aesthetics	Bence Nanay	24 Oct 2019		Philosophy
617	Dynasty	Jeroen Duindam	24 Oct 2019		History
618	Psychopathy	Essi Viding	24 Oct 2019		Psychology
619	Philosophy of Biology	Samir Okasha	28 Nov 2019		Philosophy/Biology
620	Energy Systems	Nick Jenkins	28 Nov 2019		Engineering
621	Tides	David George Bowers, Emyr Martyn Roberts	28 Nov 2019		Earth Sciences and Geography/Environment
622	Topology	Richard Earl	12 Dec 2019		Mathematics
623	Superstition	Stuart Vyse	23 Jan 2020		Religion
624	Country music	Richard Carlin	23 Jan 2020		Music
625	Korea	Michael J. Seth	23 Jan 2020		Geography/Politics
626	Trigonometry	Glen Van Brummelen	23 Jan 2020		Mathematics
627	Niels Bohr	J. L. Heilbron	23 Jan 2020		History of science/Science/Biography
628	Albert Camus	Oliver Gloag	27 Feb 2020		Literature/Biography
629	Federalism	Mark J. Rozell, Clyde Wilcox	26 Dec 2019		Politics
630	Aerial Warfare	Frank Ledwidge	26 Mar 2020	Aerial warfare: the battle for the skies, 2018	Military/History
631	Renewable Energy	Nick Jelley	27 Feb 2020; 31 Oct 2025 (2nd ed.)		Engineering
632	Prohibition	W. J. Rorabaugh	16 Jan 2020		Criminology/Politics/History – U.S.
633	The Abrahamic Religions	Charles L. Cohen	23 Apr 2020		Religion
634	Systems Biology	Eberhard O. Voit	26 Mar 2020		Biology
635	Reconstruction	Allen C. Guelzo	28 May 2020		History – U.S.
636	Number theory	Robin Wilson	28 May 2020		Mathematics
637	Smell	Matthew Cobb	28 May 2020		Medicine
638	The Sun	Philip Judge	23 Apr 2020		Astronomy
639	Emile Zola	Brian Nelson	23 July 2020		Literature/Biography
640	Fire	Andrew C. Scott	25 June 2020		Physics
641	The U.S. Civil War	Louis P. Masur	22 Oct 2020		History – U.S.
642	American Business History	Walter A. Friedman	23 July 2020		History – U.S./Economics
643	Dementia	Kathleen Taylor	23 July 2020		Medicine/Psychology
644	Canada	Donald Wright	23 July 2020		Human Geography
645	French Philosophy	Stephen Gaukroger, Knox Peden	23 July 2020		Philosophy
646	The Russian Economy	Richard Connolly	23 July 2020; 27 Aug 2026 (2nd ed.)		Economics
647	Biogeography	Mark V. Lomolino	23 July 2020		Geography
648	The Ghetto	Bryan Cheyette	27 Aug 2020		History/Human Geography
649	Ecology	Jaboury Ghazoul	27 Aug 2020		Biology
650	George Bernard Shaw	Christopher Wixson	24 Sep 2020		Literature/Biography
651	Philosophical Method	Timothy Williamson	27 Aug 2020		Philosophy
652	Soft Matter	Tom McLeish	22 Oct 2020		Physics
653	Ovid	Llewelyn Morgan	24 Sep 2020		Classical Studies/Biography
654	Modern Brazil	Anthony W. Pereira	24 Sep 2020		Human Geography
655	City Planning	Carl Abbott	26 Nov 2020		Architecture
656	The Maya	Matthew Restall, Amara Solari	26 Nov 2020		History/Archaeology
657	American Military History	Joseph T. Glatthaar	26 Nov 2020	The American Military, 2018	History – U.S./Military
658	Montaigne	William M. Hamlin	22 Oct 2020		Literature/Philosophy/Biography
659	Global Islam	Nile Green	26 Nov 2020		Religion
660	Volcanoes	Michael J. Branney, Jan Zalasiewicz	26 Nov 2020		Geology
661	Enzymes	Paul Engel	26 Nov 2020		Biology
662	Islamic Law	Mashood A. Baderin	25 Feb 2021		Religion/Law
663	Marketing	Kenneth Le Meunier-FitzHugh	25 Feb 2021		Business
664	The Virtues	Craig A. Boyd, Kevin Timpe	25 Mar 2021		Philosophy
665	War & Religion	Jolyon Mitchell, Joshua Rey	25 Mar 2021		Religion/Military/History
666	The American South	Charles Reagan Wilson	10 Dec 2020		History - U.S./Human Geography
667	Arbitration	Thomas Schultz, Thomas Grant	22 Apr 2021		Law
668	Philosophy of Physics	David Wallace	22 Apr 2021		Philosophy
669	Religion	Thomas A. Tweed	26 Nov 2020		Religion/Philosophy
670	Amphibians	T. S. Kemp	22 July 2021		Biology
671	Silent Film	Donna Kornhaber	22 Oct 2020		Cinema
672	Creativity	Vlad Petre Glăveanu	27 May 2021		Psychology
673	Refugees	Gil Loescher	27 May 2021		Human Geography/Politics
674	Biochemistry	Mark Lorch	27 May 2021		Chemistry
675	Samurai	Michael Wert	24 June 2021		History
676	Horror	Darryl Jones	24 June 2021		Literature
677	Henry James	Susan L. Mizruchi	24 June 2021		Literature/Biography
678	Human Physiology	Jamie A. Davies	27 May 2021		Medicine
679	Competition and Antitrust Law	Ariel Ezrachi	24 June 2021		Law
680	Habeas corpus	Amanda Tyler	27 May 2021		Law
681	Blasphemy	Yvonne Sherwood	26 Aug 2021		Religion
682	Jewish Literature	Ilan Stavans	22 July 2021		Religion
683	American Intellectual History	Jennifer Ratner-Rosenhagen	9 Dec 2021		History – U.S.
684	Time	Jenann Ismael	23 Sep 2021		Science
685	James Joyce	Colin MacCabe	28 Oct 2021		Literature/Biography
686	The Virgin Mary	Mary Joan Winn Leith	25 Nov 2021		Religion/Biography
687	The Arctic	Klaus Dodds, Jamie Woodward	25 Nov 2021		Geography
688	The Short Story	Andrew Kahn	9 Dec 2021		Literature
689	Pakistan	Pippa Virdee	25 Nov 2021		Geography
690	American poetry	David Caplan	25 Nov 2021		Literature
691	Philosophy of Mind	Barbara Gail Montero	6 Jan 2022		Philosophy
692	The History of Political Thought	Richard Whatmore	25 Nov 2021		Politics/History
693	Planetary Systems	Raymond T. Pierrehumbert	9 Dec 2021		Astronomy
694	Jane Austen	Tom Keymer	27 Jan 2022		Literature/Biography
695	Geometry	Maciej Dunajski	27 Apr 2022		Mathematics
696	John Stuart Mill	Gregory Claeys	24 May 2022		Politics/Biography
697	Polygamy	Sarah Pearsall	31 Dec 2021		Religion
698	Elizabeth Bishop	Jonathan F. S. Post	24 Mar 2022		Literature/Biography
699	Human Resource Management	Adrian Wilkinson	24 Feb 2022		Business
700	Mary Shelley	Charlotte Gordon	24 Mar 2022		Literature/Biography
701	Violence	Philip Dwyer	24 Mar 2022		Criminology
702	Employment Law	David Cabrelli	24 Mar 2022		Law
703	Cognitive Behavioural Therapy	Freda McManus	28 Apr 2022		Psychology
704	Theodor W. Adorno	Andrew Bowie	26 May 2022		Philosophy/Sociology/Biography
705	Ludwig Van Beethoven	Mark Evan Bonds	12 May 2022		Music/Biography
706	The Spartans	Andrew J. Bayliss	26 May 2022		Classical Studies
707	Evangelicalism	John G. Stackhouse Jr.	31 May 2022		Religion
708	Fluid Mechanics	Eric Lauga	28 Apr 2022		Physics
709	Insects	Simon Leather	23 June 2022		Biology
710	Music and Technology	Mark Katz	26 Jan 2023		Music
711	Negotiation	Carrie Menkel-Meadow	22 Sep 2022		Psychology
712	Evil	Luke Russell	27 Oct 2022		Philosophy
713	The American Judicial System	Charles L. Zelden	1 Sep 2022		Law – U.S.
714	The History of Computing	Doron Swade	25 Aug 2022		History of Science/Computing/Mathematics/Engineering
715	Ivan Pavlov	Daniel P. Todes	26 Jan 2023		History of Science/Biology/Biography
716	World Mythology	David A. Leeming	27 Oct 2022		Classical Studies/Religion
717	Hannah Arendt	Dana Villa	26 Jan 2023		Philosophy/Biography
718	Gödel's Theorem	A. W. Moore	24 Nov 2022		Mathematics
719	Microbiomes	Angela E. Douglas	24 Nov 2022		Biology
720	British Cinema	Charles Barr	28 July 2022		Cinema
721	Anselm	Thomas Williams	24 Nov 2022		Religion
722	Condensed Matter Physics	Ross McKenzie	25 May 2023		Physics
723	Nanotechnology	Philip Moriarty	29 Dec 2022		Engineering/Science
724	Addiction	Keith Humphreys	24 Jan 2023		Psychology
725	Vatican II	Shaun Blanchard, Stephen Bullivant	23 Mar 2023		Religion
726	Suburbs	Carl Abbott	23 Feb 2023		Human Geography
727	The Jury	Renee Lettow Lerner	23 Mar 2023		Law
728	Japanese Literature	Alan Tansman	15 May 2023		Literature
729	African American History	Jonathan Scott Holloway	23 Feb 2023		History – U.S.
730	The Civil Rights Movement	Thomas C. Holt	23 Feb 2023		Politics/History – U.S.
731	Ancient Greek and Roman Science	Liba Taub	25 May 2023		History of Science/Science
732	Pseudoscience	Michael D. Gordin	25 May 2023		Science
733	Bohemians	David Weir	22 June 2023		Literature
734	Mathematical Analysis	Richard Earl	22 June 2023		Mathematics
735	The History of Emotions	Thomas Dixon	25 May 2023		History
736	Ibn Sīnā (Avicenna)	Peter Adamson	27 June 2023		Philosophy/Religion/Biography
737	Invasive Species	Julie Lockwood, Dustin J. Welbourne	22 June 2023		Biology
738	Biodiversity Conservation	David W. Macdonald	27 July 2023		Biology
739	The Victorians	Martin Hewitt	24 Aug 2023		History – U.K.
740	Imagination	Jennifer Gosetti-Ferencei	26 Oct 2023		Literature
741	Horace	Llewelyn Morgan	23 Nov 2023		Literature/Biography
742	French Cinema	Dudley Andrew	26 Oct 2023		Cinema
743	Comparative Law	Sabrina Ragone and Guido Smorto	28 Mar 2024		Law
744	Simone Weil	A. Rebecca Rozelle-Stone	22 Feb 2024		Literature/Philosophy/Biography
745	The Gulag	Alan Barenberg	29 Feb 2024		History
746	Gender History	Antoinette Burton	25 July 2024		History/Gender/Sexuality
747	Dostoevsky	Deborah Martinsen	Mar 2024		Literature/Biography
748	Surveillance	David Lyon	25 July 2024		Law/Technology
749	British Architecture	Dana Arnold	23 May 2024		Architecture
750	The Self	Marya Schechtman	Mar 2024		Psychology
751	Faith	Roger Trigg	25 July 2024		Religion
752	Authoritarianism	James Loxton	24 Oct 2024		Politics
753	The Epic	Anthony Welch	28 Nov 2024		Classical Studies/History/Literature
754	Marcel Proust	Joshua Landy	12 Dec 2024		Literature/Biography
755	Thucydides	Jennifer T. Roberts	8 Nov 2024		History/Classical Studies/Biography
756	Elections	L. Sandy Maisel, Jennifer A. Yoder	26 Sep 2024		Politics
757	J.R.R. Tolkien	Matthew Townend	26 Sep 2024		Literature/Biography
758	Feminist Philosophy	Katharine Jenkins	24 Oct 2024		Gender/Philosophy
759	Sylvia Plath	Heather Clark	22 Aug 2024		Literature/Biography
760	Civil Wars	Monica Duffy Toft	26 Sep 2024		History/Politics/Military
761	Anthony Trollope	Dinah Birch	27 Feb 2025		Literature/Biography
762	Russian Politics	Brian D. Taylor	28 Nov 2024		Politics - Russia
763	The Rule of Law	Aziz Z. Huq	24 Oct 2024		Law
764	Social Science	Alexander Betts	28 Nov 2024		Social Science
765	Sustainability	Saleem H. Ali	23 Jan 2025		Environment/Environmental Science
766	Symbiosis	Nancy A. Moran	27 Feb 2025		Biological Sciences
767	Meaning	Emma Borg and Sarah A. Fisher	23 Jan 2025		Philosophy
768	The Catholic Reformation	James E. Kelly	27 Mar 2025		Religion
769	Sophocles	Edith Hall	27 Feb 2025		Classical Drama/Biography
770	Toleration	Andrew R. Murphy	23 Jan 2025		Philosophy/Law
771	Futurism	Ara H. Merjian	27 Feb 2025		Art
772	Mary Wollstonecraft	E. J. Clery	27 Mar 2025		Gender/Biography
773	Psycholinguistics	Fernanda Ferreira	23 Jan 2025		Psychology
774	Jorge Luis Borges	Ilan Stavans	12 Aug 2025		Literature/Biography
775	Henry David Thoreau	Lawrence Buell	2 June 2025	2 books labelled 775 on spine	Literature/Philosophy/Biography
775	Alexander Hamilton	R. B. Bernstein	9 Oct 2025	2 books labelled 775 on spine	History/Biography/Politics
776	George Eliot	Juliette Atkinson	21 Aug 2025		Literature/Biography
777	Moses Maimonides	Ross Bran	28 Aug 2025		Religion
778	Human Geography	Patricia Daley and Ian Klinke	28 Aug 2025		Human Geography
779	Entropy	James Binney	25 Sep 2025		Physics
780	Postwar Europe	Richard Bessel	28 Aug 2025		History
781	Agatha Christie	Gill Plain	23 Oct 2025		Literature/Biography
782	Cicero	Yelena Baraz	23 Oct 2025		History
783	Oral History	Douglas A. Boyd	9 Jan 2026		History
784	Herman Melville	Maurice S. Lee	26 Feb 2026		Literature/Biography
785	Environmental Justice	Pamela Hill	3 Feb 2026		Law
786	The Iraq Wars	Samuel Helfont	22 Jan 2026		History/Military/Politics
787	Mathematical Biology	Philip K. Maini	25 Sep 2025		Mathematics/Biology/Medicine
788	Neurodiversity	Robert Chapman and Sue Fletcher-Watson	26 Mar 2026		Psychology
789	Administrative Law	Stephen Thomson	27 Nov 2025		Law/Environment
790	Thomas More	Peter Marshall	26 Mar 2026		History/Biography/Religion/Philosophy
791	Humanitarianism	Julia F. Irwin	25 June 2026		Politics/History
794	Decision Making	Stefano Palminteri and Valentin Wyart	28 May 2026		Psychology
799	Black Narratives of Slavery	Robert J. Patterson	21 Apr 2026		History
800	Rock 'n' Roll	Elijah Wald	15 July 2026		Music
	Moral Responsibility	Paul Russell	27 Aug 2026		Philosophy
	Walter Benjamin	Eli Zaretsky	1 Sep 2026		Biography
	Contract Law	Mindy Chen-Wishart	24 Sep 2026		Law
	Evolutionary Psychology	Maryanne L. Fisher and T. Joel Wade	24 Sep 2026		Psychology
	Aerospace Engineering	John Baker	24 Sep 2026		Science
	Latinx Literature	Frederick Luis Aldama	3 Nov 2026		Literature
