= Linguistics (disambiguation) =

Linguistics is the scientific study of languages.

Linguistics may also refer to these publications:

- Linguistics (journal), a bimonthly De Gruyter periodical (1963 onwards)
- Linguistics: A Very Short Introduction, a 2003 OUP concise guide
- Linguistics: An Introduction to Language and Communication, an MIT Press textbook (1979 onwards)
