= Jeremy Moon =

Jeremy Moon may refer to:

- Jeremy Moon (academic) (born 1955), British academic
- Jeremy Moon (artist) (1934–1973), British painter
- Jeremy Moon (entrepreneur) (born 1969), New Zealand entrepreneur
