= Richard Clement Wade =

American historian (1921–2008)

- Wade in 1985
- Born: July 14, 1921; Des Moines, Iowa, U.S.
- Died: July 18, 2008 (aged 87); New York City, U.S.
- Spouse(s): Louise Carroll (divorced), Cynthia Hyla Whitaker (divorced), Liane Wood-Thomas

Academic background
- Education: University of Rochester
- Thesis: ""
- Influences: Arthur Schlesinger, Sr., Frederick Jackson Turner

Academic work
- Discipline: History
- Sub-discipline: US urban history
- Institutions: University of Rochester; Washington University in St. Louis; University of Chicago; CUNY Graduate Center
- Notable students: Kenneth T. Jackson, Carl Abbott
- Main interests: Frontier cities, urban slavery
- Notable works: The Urban Frontier (1959); Slavery in the Cities: The South, 1820-1860 (1964)
- Notable ideas: Cities "as spearheads of the frontier"

Richard Clement Wade (July 14, 1921 – July 18, 2008) was an American historian and urban studies professor who advised many Democratic politicians and candidates. As a historian, he pioneered the interdisciplinary application of social science techniques to the study of urban history and promoted cities as an important academic subject.

== Early life ==
Although born in Des Moines, Iowa, Wade grew up in Winnetka, Illinois. Among his neighbors were Archibald MacLeish and Harold L. Ickes.

Wade attended New Trier High School and was a tennis star.

Wade matriculated at the University of Rochester, where as a student-athlete, he participated in multiple sports while earning a B.A. degree with High Honors in History, 1943 and M.A. degree in history, 1945.

== Career ==
=== Academics ===
Wade continued his graduate education at Harvard University, where he studied under Arthur M. Schlesinger Sr.

After obtaining his PhD in Urban History in 1956, Wade re-wrote his dissertation and published it as The Urban Frontier. Meanwhile, he started a teaching career, first at the University of Rochester, followed by Washington University in St. Louis, University of Chicago, and the Graduate Center of the City University of New York.

In 1971 Wade was named a distinguished professor of history at Graduate Center of the City University of New York. In 1974–1975 Wade was the Harold Vyvyan Harmsworth Professor of American History at Oxford University.

Wade was a co-founder and the first president of the Urban History Association. "He started a movement," said his former student Kenneth T. Jackson. "There are hundreds of books on cities now, and in a sense he is their grandfather. The only reason I took urban history was because of him; I had never heard of such a thing."

Wade was a close friend of Arthur Schlesinger, Jr., with whom he shared an office at the Graduate Center.

Among Wade's undergraduate and graduate students were Kenneth T. Jackson, Carl Abbott, Harold Rabinowitz, Howard Chudacoff, and Thomas Philpott.

=== Politics ===
Wade was also active in politics. In addition to advising Adlai Stevenson, he advised John F. Kennedy and had been one of his speech writers. He was a regional Campaign Manager on Robert Kennedy's 1964 US Senate Campaign, and for George McGovern in his Democratic primary for president in 1972. He worked on New York City's Mayor David Dinkins' mayoral campaign. In 1991, Governor Mario Cuomo appointed Wade to be chairman of New York State's Commission on Libraries. He later sat on the New York State Board of Regents.

== Personal life ==
Prior to his third and final marriage to Liane Wood-Thomas in 1997, Wade was married first to Louise L. Carroll of Toledo, Ohio in 1948. Carroll was a 1948 graduate of Wellesley College. The Wades settled in Rochester, New York where Louise Wade worked on a graduate degree in history at the University of Rochester and Richard Wade taught history. Wade secondly married Cynthia Hyla Whittaker of New York in 1975. No children were born to Wade by any of his 3 wives.

== Death and legacy ==
Wade died at his home in Roosevelt Island in Manhattan, New York on 18 July 2008. His wife, Liane Wood-Thomas Wade, survived him.

Ohio Valley History created the Richard C. Wade Award and announced that a first recipient would be named in 2009.

== Views ==
His first book The Urban Frontier (1959) was a challenge to Frederick Jackson Turner's Frontier thesis, asserting that the catalysts for western expansion were the Western cities like Pittsburgh, Louisville, and Cincinnati, not the pioneer farmers.

In The Urban Frontier, Wade summarized the claims that scholars had made for the importance of the city in American history. The cities were the focal points for the growth of the West, especially those along the Ohio River and Mississippi River. The cities, especially Boston were the seedbeds of the American Revolution. The rivalry between cities, such as between Baltimore and Philadelphia, or between Chicago and St. Louis, stimulated economic innovations and growth, especially regarding the railroads. The failure of the South to develop an urban infrastructure significantly weakened it during the American Civil War, especially after its border cities of Baltimore, Washington, Louisville, and St. Louis refused to join the Confederacy. The cities were fonts of innovation in democracy, especially in terms of building powerful political organizations and machines; they were also the main base for reformers of what those machines built, becoming the home base for important immigrant groups, especially the Irish and the Jews. Cities were the strongholds of labor unions in the 19th and 20th centuries (although no longer true in the 21st century). See Richard Wade, "The City in History: Some American Perspectives," in Werner Z. Hirsch, ed., Urban Life and Form (1963) pages 59–77. In "Slavery in the Cities" Wade undermined a common understanding that slavery is a purely agrarian labor system emphasizing the importance of the South's commercial cities.

== Works ==
- The Urban Frontier: The Rise of Western Cities, 1790–1830 (1959) read online
- Slavery in the Cities: The South, 1820–1860 (1964)
- Chicago: Growth of a Metropolis (1973) (with Harold Melvin Mayer) OCLC 301295200
