= Christopher Berry (disambiguation) =

Christopher Berry may refer to:

- Christopher Berry, American character actor
- Christopher J. Berry (born 1942), British philosopher
