= Anthony Arnull =

British professor in law and researcher

Professor Anthony Arnull KC (Hon)

Academic background
- Education: University of Sussex (BA); University of Leicester (PhD)
- Thesis: The impact on the individual of the general principles of the law of the European Economic Community (1987)
- Doctoral advisor: Alan Dashwood
- Website: https://www.birmingham.ac.uk/staff/profiles/law/arnull-anthony.aspx

Anthony "Tony" Arnull KC (Hon) is a British legal scholar specialising in EU law and holds the Barber Chair of Jurisprudence at the University of Birmingham's Law School.

== Early life and education ==
Arnull studied a BA in Law at the University of Sussex and at the Institut d'études européennes, Université libre de Bruxelles. He later qualified as a Solicitor of the Senior Courts of England and Wales within a Magic Circle law firm. He then received a PhD from the University of Leicester.

== Career and research ==
=== 1990 ===
Arnull wrote The General Principles of EEC Law and the Individual in 1990, assessing the impact of the European Court of Justice. In a review, Lewis outlined:

"It must also be said that the discussion is certainly thorough and scholarly and Arnull makes thought-provoking observations on the case law."

=== 2003 ===
Arnull provided a memorandum to the UK's House of Lords after being asked to comment on the new roles the European Court of Justice would play in the Treaty of Nice

=== 2010 ===
Arnull contributed to Channel 4's FactCheck on the Lord Pearson's claim: "Most of our national law is now made in Brussels" on Sky (6 April 2010)

=== 2017 ===
In 2017, Arnull published European Union law: a very short introduction, a book aimed at the general public to introduce the laws of the European Union, within the popular a very short introduction book series from Oxford University Press.

== Editor ==
Arnull is a consultant editor on the European Law Journal

== Honours ==
In 2024, Arnull was made an honorary King's Counsel, in recognition of his outstanding scholarship on European Union Law, which, the Ministry of Justice noted, "is widely respected and has had a significant impact on legislation and case law."

== Publications ==
=== Books ===
- European Union Law: A Very Short Introduction (2017)
- The European Union and its Court of Justice (2006)
- The General Principles of EEC Law and the Individual (1990).
- The Oxford Handbook of European Union Law (2015).
