= Gill Plain =

British literary historian and academic

Gillian Mary Plain FRSE
- Other name: Gill

Academic background
- Education: Newcastle University (PhD); University of Cambridge (MA)
- Thesis: Strategies for Survival: Fiction and Reality in British Women's Writing of the Second World War (1992)
- Doctoral advisor: Linda Anderson

Academic work
- Discipline: Historian
- Sub-discipline: Literary history
- Institutions: University of St Andrews; University of Glamorgan

Gillian Mary Plain is a British literary historian and academic. She is currently the professor of english literature and popular culture at the University of St Andrews, and she was awarded a Fellowship of the Royal Society of Edinburgh in 2026.

== Education ==
Plain obtained a Master of Arts in history and English from the University of Cambridge.

In 1989, Plain attended the Newcastle University. Under the supervision of Linda Anderson, her thesis was titled Strategies for Survival: Fiction and Reality in British Women's Writing of the Second World War. In 1993, she graduated with a Doctor of Philosophy.

== Career ==
Upon graduation, Plain joined the University of Glamorgan. In 1998, she joined the University of St Andrews, as a lecturer in crime fiction. Later, she was a reader in English. In 2006, she was promoted to professor. Between 2014 to 2017, Plain was the head of the School of English.

In April 2026, Plain was elected a Fellow of the Royal Society of Edinburgh, in the discipline of language, literature and history. In October 2026, she was appointed a Bye-Fellow of Robinson College.

== Research ==
Plain is a literary historian and feminist critic, researching specifically on British literature, film, and culture of the mid-20th-century, crime fiction, war writing, and gender studies. She has authored or co-authored more than 40 publications.

== Selected publications ==
=== Books ===
- Plain, Gill (1 July 1996). Women's Fiction of the Second World War: Gender, Power and Resistance. Edinburgh: Edinburgh University Press. doi:10.1515/9781474471701. ISBN 9780748606610. JSTOR 10.3366/j.ctvxcrmq1. OCLC 34932781.
- Plain, Gill (27 April 2001). Twentieth-Century Crime Fiction: Gender, Sexuality and the Body. Edinburgh: Edinburgh University Press. doi:10.1515/9781474430005. ISBN 9780748610877. JSTOR 10.3366/j.ctvwcjh8k. OCLC 46395050.
- Plain, Gill (23 March 2006). John Mills and British Cinema: Masculinity, Identity and Nation. Edinburgh: Edinburgh University Press. doi:10.3366/edinburgh/9780748621071.001.0001. ISBN 9780748621071. JSTOR 10.3366/j.ctt1r2712. OCLC 63399157.
- Plain, Gill (30 October 2013). Literature of the 1940s: War, Postwar and "Peace": Volume 5. Edinburgh: Edinburgh University Press. doi:10.3366/edinburgh/9780748627448.001.0001. ISBN 9780748627448. JSTOR 10.3366/j.ctt5hh2sj. OCLC 881577717.
- Plain, Gill (5 June 2025). Agatha Christie: A Very Short Introduction. Very Short Introductions. Oxford: Oxford University Press. doi:10.1093/9780191896095.001.0001. ISBN 9780198863748. LCCN 2025930595. OCLC 1521233778.

=== Journals ===
- Plain, Gill (19 October 2020). "'Tale Engineering': Agatha Christie and the Aftermath of the Second World War". Literature & History. 29 (2): 179–199. doi:10.1177/0306197320945945. eISSN 2050-4594. hdl:10023/20915. ISSN 0306-1973.
- Plain, Gill (12 February 2024). "Death on the Roads: Motoring with Agatha Christie". Crime Fiction Studies. 5 (1): 18–33. doi:10.3366/cfs.2024.0108. eISSN 2517-7990. hdl:10023/29404. ISSN 2517-7982.
