= Damien Keown =

Bioethicist focused on Buddhist ethics

Damien Keown (born 1951) is a British academic, bioethicist, and authority on Buddhist bioethics. He is Professor Emeritus in the Department of History at Goldsmiths, University of London. Keown earned a B.A. in religious studies from the University of Lancaster in 1977 and a D.Phil. from the Faculty of Oriental Studies at the University of Oxford in 1986.

Keown has published research examining Buddhism and the ethics of suicide, the issue of brain death as it relates to organ donation, and the ethical relationship between Buddhism and ecology. Keown's published works include The Nature of Buddhist Ethics (1992) and Buddhism & Bioethics (1995). He has also served as editor for the Routledge Encyclopedia of Buddhism and produced two books in Oxford University's Very Short Introduction series, one on Buddhism and the other on Buddhist ethics. He is a Fellow of the Royal Asiatic Society.

== Bibliography ==
- The Nature of Buddhist Ethics. London: Palgrave Macmillan. 1992
- Buddhism: A Very Short Introduction. Oxford: Oxford University Press, 1996.
- Buddhism and Abortion. Honolulu: University of Hawai'i Press, 1999.
- Contemporary Buddhist Ethics. Cambridge, Massachusetts: Harvard University Press, 2000.
- Buddhism & Bioethics. London: Macmillan Palgrave, 2001
- Buddhist Ethics: A Very Short Introduction. Oxford: Oxford University Press, 2005.
