= Michael Allen Fox =

American/Canadian/Australian philosopher

- Born: 7 May 1940 (age 86)

Education
- Education: Cornell University (BA), University of Toronto (MA,PhD)

Philosophical work
- Institutions: Queen's University
- Notable works: The Case for Animal Experimentation (1986); Deep Vegetarianism (1999)

Michael Allen Fox (born 7 May 1940) is an American/Canadian/Australian philosopher who was based at Queen's University in Kingston, Ontario from 1966 until his retirement in 2005. He is the author of a number of books: The Case for Animal Experimentation: An Evolutionary and Ethical Perspective (University of California Press, 1986)—the arguments and conclusion of which he later rejected—Deep Vegetarianism (Temple University Press, 1999), The Accessible Hegel (Humanity Books, 2005), The Remarkable Existentialists (Humanity, 2009), Understanding Peace (Routledge, 2014), Home: A Very Short Introduction (Oxford University Press, 2016), and Fate and Life: Who's Really in Charge? (McGill-Queen's University Press, 2024).

== Career ==
Fox studied for a Bachelor of Arts at Cornell University and then a Master of Arts and PhD at the University of Toronto. He began teaching in the Department of Philosophy at Queen's University in 1966, and remained at the institution until his retirement to Armidale, New South Wales, Australia, in 2005. He also took up visiting positions at the University of New England and the Australian National University. He was, in 1996, the University of Tasmania's James Martineau Memorial Lecturer. In addition to teaching at Queen's, he was the editor of Queen's Quarterly for a decade.

Fox's first monograph was The Case for Animal Experimentation: An Evolutionary and Ethical Perspective, which was published by the University of California Press in 1986. Fox had been unimpressed by Peter Singer's call for animal liberation in the latter's 1975 book, and had dismissed Singer's arguments about the wrong of speciesism. Fox then published a series of papers challenging Singer's ideas, and advised several organisations on animal experimentation. In The Case for Animal Experimentation, Fox argues that, in many cases, invasive animal testing is ethically justifiable, and that the ethical challenges to it can be overcome. He also explores a number of experiments that have received particular criticism from critics, including some addressed by Singer. Much of the book is given over to an explanation and exploration of the place of animal testing in science. Despite his defence of animal testing, Fox closes the book with a series of recommendations for how the system could be improved. The book was widely reviewed, and a paperback edition was released in 1988.

Less than a year after the book's initial publication, Fox found himself "in radical disagreement with some of its major theses". Fox published a paper in Between the Species ("Animal experimentation: a philosopher's changing views") retracting his arguments and offering a case against animal experimentation, describing The Case for Animal Experimentation as "an embarrassment" to him. Quoting his own words on human superiority, he wrote that he "now look[s] at these arrogant remarks with dismay". He reported that critical reviews and the comments of a personal friend had been able to awaken him from "dogmatic slumber" about human duties to animals. Years later, Fox published a paper in Organization & Environment entitled "The Case Against Animal Experimentation", representing the "reversal of the view [he] once defended". This paper analysed and supplemented Joan Dunayer's critique of animal testing.

After retracting his arguments in The Case for Animal Experimentation, Fox went on to author Deep Vegetarianism with Temple University Press in 1999. In this book, Fox presents arguments in favour of vegetarianism, exploring its cultural and historical background and linking it with other progressive movements, especially feminist movements.

In 2005, the same year as his retirement from Queen's, Fox published The Accessible Hegel, an introduction to the thought of G. W. F. Hegel, with the Humanity Books imprint of Prometheus Books. Since his retirement, he has published The Remarkable Existentialists (2009, Humanity Books), an introduction to the thought of several figures associated with existentialism, and Understanding Peace: A Comprehensive Introduction in 2013 with Routledge. In the latter book, Fox presents peace as a way of life and an ideal to be aimed for, asking the question of why humans engage in violent activity and what can be done to prevent violence. In 2016, his Home: A Very Short Introduction was published as a part of the Oxford University Press Very Short Introduction series. In 2024, at age 84, Fox published Fate and Life: Who's Really in Charge? with McGill-Queen's University Press.

== Select bibliography ==
In addition to his books, Fox has published over 20 book chapters, over 40 peer reviewed journal articles, over 50 book reviews and a range of other popular, academic and technical works.

- Fox, Michael Allen, ed. (1980). Schopenhauer: His Philosophical Achievement. Brighton, England: Harvester Press; Totowa, New Jersey: Barnes & Noble.
- Fox, Michael Allen, and Leo Groarke, eds. (1985). Nuclear War: Philosophical Perspectives. New York: Peter Lang.
- Fox, Michael Allen (1986). The Case for Animal Experimentation: An Evolutionary and Ethical Perspective. Berkeley, California: University of California Press.
- Fox, Michael Allen (1999). Deep Vegetarianism. Philadelphia, Pennsylvania: Temple University Press.
- Fox, Michael Allen (2005). The Accessible Hegel. Amherst, New York: Humanity Books.
- Fox, Michael Allen (2009). The Remarkable Existentialists. Amherst, New York: Humanity Books.
- Fox, Michael Allen (2013). Understanding Peace. London: Routledge.
- Fox, Michael Allen (2016). Home: A Very Short Introduction. Oxford: Oxford University Press.
- Fox, Michael Allen (2024). Fate and Life: Who's Really in Charge? McGill-Queen's University Press.
