= Anna Cento Bull =

British academic

Anna Cento Bull is a British academic specialising in post-World War II Italian history. She is emeritus Professor of Italian History and Politics at the University of Bath, where she has taught since 1996. She holds an undergraduate degree from the University of Naples and a doctorate from the University of Reading. Her work has focused on terrorism, political identities, and memories of conflicts. She has written about subjects such as the Lega Nord, terrorism during the Years of Lead and its resolution, and post-war neofascist movements. The concept of "agonistic memory" is an important reference point for Bull's research.

== Works ==
=== Italian Neofascism (2007) ===
Italian Neofascism: The Strategy of Tension and the Politics of Nonreconciliation examines the political violence (stragismo) carried out by neofascist groups in Italy between the 1960s and 1980s during the years of the strategy of tension. A large part of the book is drawn from judicial findings, from which Bull "links the neofascists with elements of the armed forces, Carabinieri and intelligence services, who at times worked to protect sources or sympathizers" but "leaves many unanswered questions in her narrative about the allegations of domestic and foreign intelligence agencies recruiting neofascists in response to fears of communist influences."

Drawing on narrative psychology, the second part of the book examines neofascist narratives of the violence. These largely disclaim responsibility in different ways. This section is constructed from interviews and published writings by Gabriele Adinolfi, Stefano Delle Chiaie, and Giuseppe Valerio Fioravanti. Bull concludes that "it is only at the level of violent conflict that Italy may be deemed to have achieved a long- lasting peace. By any other criteria – tolerance, nonvictimisation, rehumanising and nondemonising the adversary, self-transformation and a more balanced self-identity – national reconciliation remains a distant target." The book was positively reviewed in Terrorism and Political Violence and Modern Italy. The latter review observed that Bull "makes an implicit argument about the hierarchies of historiography. She treats the long judicial casebooks produced in Italy as authoritative documents while characterising the statements and testimony of the right as symptomatic and tendentious rather than as sources of oral history."

=== Ending Terrorism in Italy (2013) ===
As suggested by its title, Ending Terrorism in Italy examines the conclusion of the Years of Lead. The first part of the book focuses on how terrorists were processed by the judicial and prison systems. In the 1980s, laws were passed mandating harsher sentences for terrorism-related offences, while at the same time offering reduced sentences to former terrorists who gave information to police or simply dissociated themselves from their former groups (pentiti). Bull examines the trade-offs of these laws, which sometimes granted freedom to perpetrators who had failed to provide a clear account of their crimes, or resulted in violent offenders receiving lighter sentences than those who were involved with terrorist groups at lower levels and thus had no useful information to share with authorities.

In the second part, Bull again examines memories of the violence, from the perspectives of perpetrators and victims or their families. She observes that the latter focus more on the role of the state, which remains unclear, writing: "Even if not proven, there are sufficient grounds for arguing that the behaviour of the Italian State in fighting armed terrorism has been relatively opaque and twisted, enough to require it to embark on some form of reparation and reconciliation." The conclusion of the book considers prospects for reconciliation and shared memory, with The Troubles and the Basque conflict as reference points. The book was positively reviewed in H-Net: "the primary contribution of Ending Terrorism in Italy lies in its original and comprehensive account of the various processes, factors, and practices contributing to the ending of terrorism in Italy and its incisive evaluation of the legacy of the same."

== Selected publications ==
- From Peasant to Entrepreneur: The Survival of the Family Economy in Italy, with P. Corner (1993). ISBN 978-0-85496-309-6.
- Entrepreneurial Textile Communities, with M. Pitt and J. Szarka (1993).
- Social Identities and Political Cultures in Italy (2000).
- The Lega Nord and the Northern Question in Italian Politics, with M. Gilbert (2001).
- Italian Neofascism: The Strategy of Tension and the Politics of Nonreconciliation (2007).
- Ending Terrorism in Italy, with P. Cooke (2013).
- Modern Italy: A Very Short Introduction (2017).
