= Stoicism: A Very Short Introduction =

2018 book by Brad Inwood

- Author: Brad Inwood
- Language: English
- Series: Very Short Introductions
- Subject: Stoic philosophy
- Genre: Textbook
- Published: 2018
- Publisher: Oxford University Press
- Publication place: United Kingdom
- Pages: 136
- ISBN: 978-0-19-878666-5

Stoicism: A Very Short Introduction is a 2018 philosophy book by Brad Inwood. As part of the Very Short Introductions series published by Oxford University Press, it is aimed at the lay reader.

== Contents ==
Stoicism begins and ends by relating the modern revival of Stoicism as embodied by Epictetus and Marcus Aurelius. It covers the history of the school and its doctrines in what it classified as the three areas of philosophy: physics, ethics and logic.

== Bibliography ==
- Colen, J. A.; Vecchio, Anthony S. (2019). De Schutter, Helder (ed.). "Review of Brad Inwood, Stoicism: A Very Short Introduction" (PDF). Ethical Perspectives. 26 (3): 539–543.
- Warren, James (2019). "Book Notes: Hellenistic and Roman Philosophy". Phronesis. 64 (4): 515–525. JSTOR 26832224.
