= T. S. Kemp =

British palaeontologist

Thomas Stainforth Kemp is a British zoologist and palaeontologist. He is known for his work on the evolution of mammals, and particularly for identifying the criteria by which proto-mammals (synapsids) should be classified as mammals. He is an emeritus fellow of St John's College, Oxford, and he was the curator of the zoological collections in the Oxford University Museum of Natural History until his retirement in 2009.

As well as many academic papers, and four academic books on palaeontology and evolution, Kemp has written three books in the Very Short Introductions series.

== Bibliography ==
- Studies in vertebrate evolution (1972: Oliver & Boyd), co-edited with Kenneth Alan Joysey
- Mammal-like reptiles and the origin of mammals (1982: Academic Press)
- Fossils and evolution (1999: OUP)
- The origin and evolution of mammals (2005: OUP)
- The origin of higher taxa: palaeobiological, developmental, and ecological perspectives (2016: OUP & Chicago University Press)
- Mammals: A Very Short Introduction (2017: OUP)
- Reptiles: A Very Short Introduction (2019: OUP)
- Amphibians: A Very Short Introduction (2021: OUP)
