= Number Symbolism =

1970 book by Christopher Butler

- Author: Christopher Butler
- Subject: Numerology
- Publisher: Routledge (UK), Barnes & Noble (US)
- Publication date: 1970
- Pages: 186
- ISBN: 0-300-08872-8

Number Symbolism is a 1970 book by English academic Christopher Butler. The book documents the occult tradition of numerology and how its use in Ancient Greek philosophy and Judeo-Christian beliefs influenced Western culture. Number Symbolism provided context to the work of scholars who were promoting numerological analysis in the decade prior to the book's publication.

== Commentary and reviews ==
- "Reservations". The Antioch Review. 30 (2): 267-268. 1970. ISSN 0003-5769.
- Barden, Garrett (1973). "Review of Sociology of Meaning; The Psychology of Imagination; Working Papers in Cultural Studies 3; Number Symbolism". Studies: An Irish Quarterly Review. 62 (245): 96–98. ISSN 0039-3495.
- Davies, H. Neville (1972). "Review of Number Symbolism". The Modern Language Review. 67 (2): 390–391. doi:10.2307/3722319. ISSN 0026-7937.
- Graband, Gerhard (1972). "Christopher Butler, "Number Symbolism" (Book Review)". Anglia. 90 (1): 198.
- Harré, Rom (1972). "Review of Number Symbolism; Silent Poetry. Essays in Numerological Analysis". The Review of English Studies. 23 (89): 105–107. ISSN 0034-6551.
- Heninger, S. K. (1972). "Christopher Butler. Number Symbolism. New York: Barnes & Noble, Inc". Renaissance Quarterly. 25 (3): 352–356. doi:10.2307/2859025.
- Kolin, Philip C. (1997). "Time-Beguiling Sport: Number Symbolism in Shakespeare's Venus and Adonis (1964): Christopher Butler and Alastair Fowler". Venus and Adonis: Critical Essays. Florence: Routledge. pp. 165–177. ISBN 9781136744327.
- Raban, Jonathan (July 31, 1970). "Code-Cracking". New Statesman. 80: 124–125.
