= Linguistics: An Introduction to Language and Communication =

1979 linguistics textbook

- Author: Adrian Akmajian, Ann K. Farmer, Lee S. Bickmore, Richard A. Demers and Robert M. Harnish
- Language: English
- Subject: linguistics
- Genre: textbook
- Publisher: MIT Press
- Publication date: 1979 (1st ed), 2017 (7th ed)
- Media type: Print (hardcover)
- ISBN: 9780262533263

Linguistics: An Introduction to Language and Communication is a textbook by Adrian Akmajian, Ann K. Farmer, Lee S. Bickmore, Richard A. Demers and Robert M. Harnish in which the authors provide an introduction to linguistics. It is described as a well-known introductory text in linguistics.

== Reception ==
The book has been reviewed by Sheila M. Embleton, Marcia Haag, Rose Maclaran and Chr. Maier.
