= Michael Allingham =

British economist (born 1943)

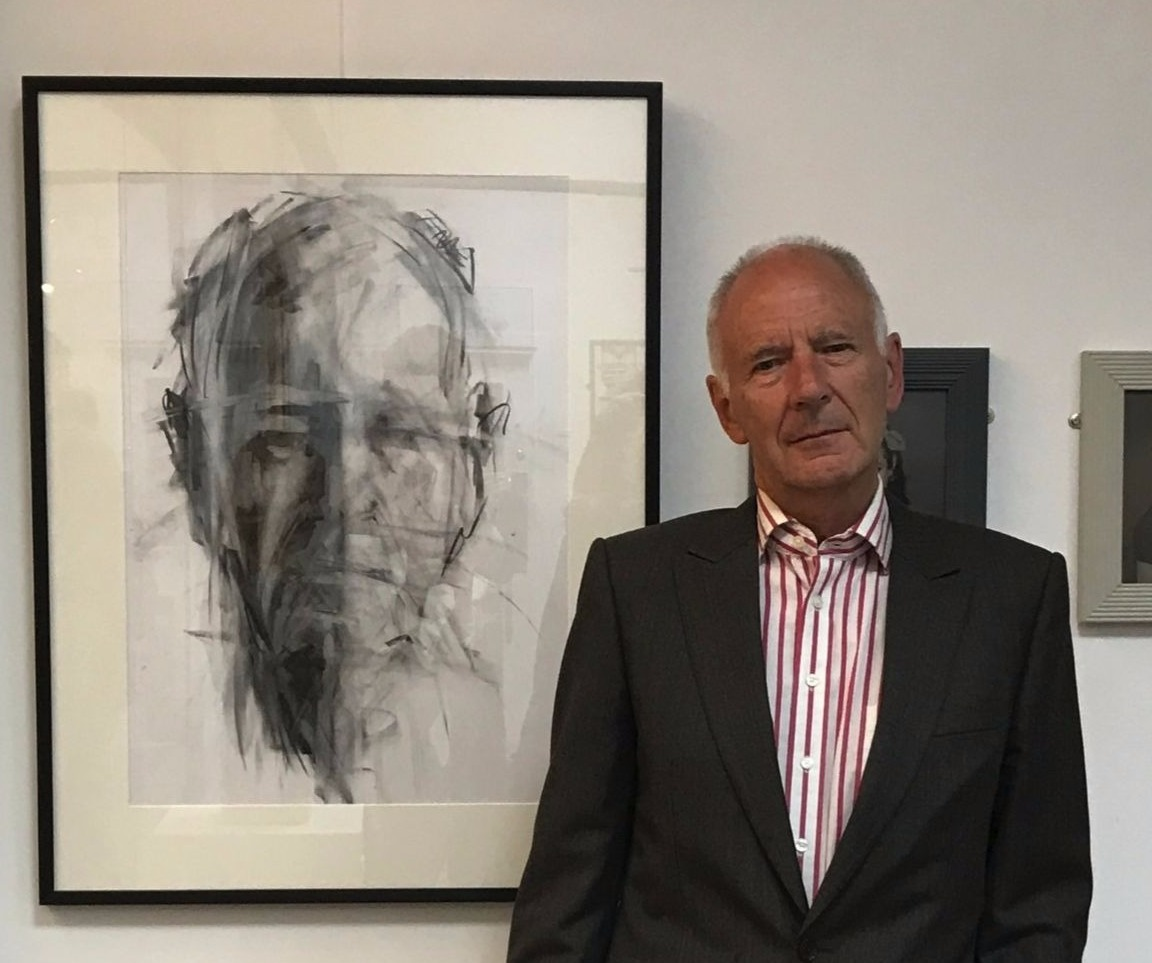

Academic background
- Education: University of Edinburgh

Michael Allingham is a British economist whose main work has been on general equilibrium theory, choice theory, and distributive justice.

== Life ==
Allingham was educated at Lancing College and then at the University of Edinburgh, where he 'read natural philosophy and then political economy'. From 1967 until 1977, he taught at various universities in the U.K. and the U.S.. From 1977 to 1993 he held the chair in economic theory at the University of Kent; and from 1993 to 2009 he was Frank Richardson Fellow at Magdalen College, Oxford, where he is now an Emeritus Fellow.

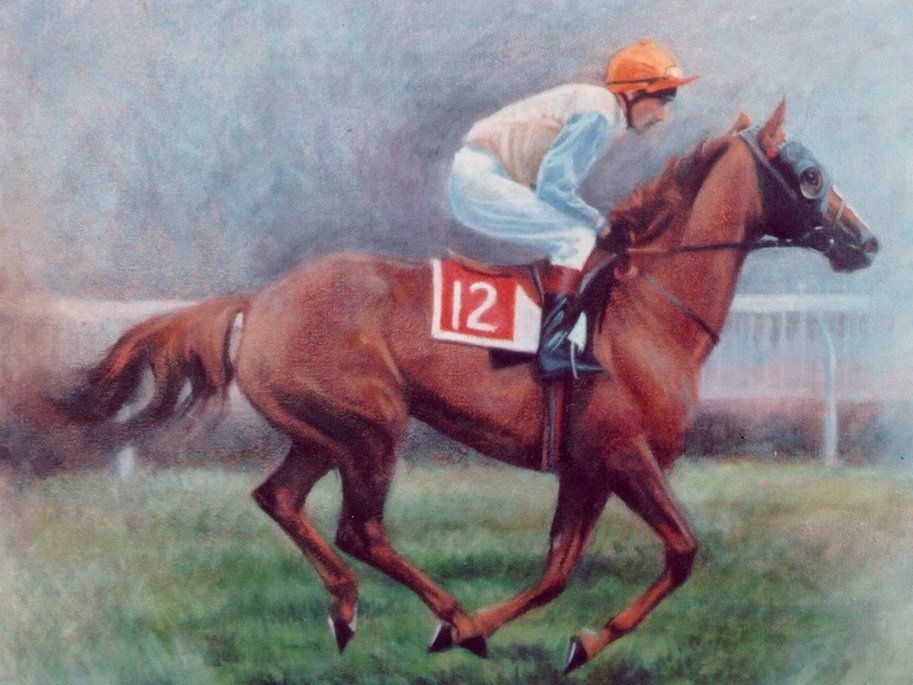
At Newmarket (oil on canvas by Sally Martin)

Allingham has ridden under Jockey Club rules, and was joint-owner of the winner of the 2002 Dewhurst Stakes, 'the single most significant two-year-old race in Europe'. He has been a Local Steward, and Racecourse Chairman, with the Jockey Club.

== Work ==
Before moving to Oxford Allingham's main work was on general equilibrium theory; while he was teaching at Magdalen it was on rational choice theory; and subsequently, having taken an MA in philosophy, it has been on distributive justice.

General equilibrium theory is 'the most prestigious economics of all'. In substance, it concerns the workings of the entire economy; in style, it is axiomatic and rigorous. Léon Walras, the founder of general equilibrium theory, claimed in 1854 that 'pure economics is, in essence, the theory of the determination of prices under a hypothetical regime of perfectly free competition'. Allingham's work is rooted in the Walrasian tradition: in his entry in Who's Who in Economics he refers to Walras's definition, and says that his own work may be seen as an extension of this.

Rational choice theory transcends the boundaries of economics, and exemplifies Allingham's interests as being 'in the core theoretical problems which lie at the intersection of philosophy and economics'. It explores what is meant by rationality, and how this may be characterized. His work in this area is also axiomatic: as a review in The Economic Journal of his book Rational Choice notes, 'its treatment is abstract and axiomatic ... few concessions are being made to the uninitiated'.

Distributive justice again transcends the boundaries of economics. It considers what is meant by a just distribution of goods among members of society. Allingham develops the view that all theories of justice, or at least all liberal theories, may be seen as expressions of laissez-faire with compensations for factors that are considered to be morally arbitrary. His latest book has been described by a reviewer as 'a probing analytical comparison, by an economic theorist, of the major accounts dominating that literature ... meticulously isolating their respective strengths and weaknesses: a tour de force'.

Allingham is also the author of the novel Trust, 'an entertainment in the sense used by Graham Greene: a story that shows a profound interest in the interplay of morality and abnormal behavior'.

== Publications ==
Academic books

- Distributive Justice. Routledge. 2014.
- Rational choice theory (ed.). Routledge. 2006.
- Choice Theory: A Very Short Introduction. Oxford University Press. 2002. (translated into Arabic, Chinese, Italian, Russian, and Spanish; also available as an Audiobook)
- Rational Choice. Springer. 1999.
- Arbitrage: Elements of Financial Economics. Springer. 1991. (translated into Italian)
- Theory of Markets. Springer. 1989.
- Unconscious Contracts. Routledge. 1987.
- Value. Macmillan. 1983.
- General Equilibrium. Wiley. 1975.
- Equilibrium and Disequilibrium. Ballinger. 1973.

Significant articles

- Existence theorems in the Capital Asset Pricing Model, Econometrica, 59
- Stability of monopoly, Econometrica, 44
- Equilibrium and stability, Econometrica, 42 (reprinted in Critical Ideas in Economics: Equilibrium, ed. Walker)
- Tâtonnement stability, Econometrica, 40
- Second best and decentralization (with Archibald), Journal of Economic Theory, 10
- The measurement of inequality, Journal of Economic Theory, 5
- Progression and leisure, American Economic Review, 62
- Income tax evasion: a theoretical analysis (with Sandmo), Journal of Public Economics, 1
