= Linguistics: A Very Short Introduction =

Book by Peter Hugoe Matthews

- Author: Peter Hugoe Matthews
- Language: English
- Series: Very Short Introductions
- Subject: linguistics
- Genre: textbook
- Publisher: Oxford
- Publication date: 2003
- Media type: Print (hardcover)
- ISBN: 9780192801487

Linguistics: A Very Short Introduction is a book by Peter Hugoe Matthews in which the author provides an introduction to linguistics.

== Reception ==
The book was reviewed by Ute Römer of the University of Hanover, who wrote that Matthews "has performed the very difficult task of compressing a wealth of material and presenting it in a most accessible way", and by Cheryl Eason of Central Missouri State University, who wrote "I would... suggest that a number of the ideas in the text be illustrated with examples from morphology or syntax rather than phonology. The phonological examples from English are limited in their effectiveness because English pronunciation differs so much from place to place."

== See also ==
- Language: Introductory Readings
