= Peter Hugoe Matthews =

British linguist (1934–2023)

Peter Hugoe Matthews FBA (10 March 1934 – 7 April 2023) was a British linguist and historian of linguistics. He was a fellow of St John's College, Cambridge, and formerly Professor and Head of the Department of Linguistics at the University of Cambridge (1980–2001). He was elected a Fellow of the British Academy in 1985.

Matthews is perhaps best known for his writings on linguistic morphology. He published two monographs on the subject.

Matthews was an early follower of Noam Chomsky, but lost enthusiasm for the "generative enterprise" during the 1960s. He described the Chomskyan revolution as "the Best Thing that has happened to linguistics in the past 2500 years" (with his tongue squarely in his cheek, of course). But he also wrote that dominance of various Chomskyan ideas is not "a Good Thing, and I would not be disappointed if my study of their origins were to lead more scholars to question them".

Peter Hugoe Matthews died on 7 April 2023, at the age of 89.

== Selected publications ==
- Inflectional Morphology: A theoretical study based on aspects of Latin verb conjugation (1972) Cambridge University Press, Cambridge, ISBN 0-521-08372-9
- Morphology: An introduction to the theory of word-structure (1974, 2nd revd edition 1991)
- Generative Grammar and Linguistic Competence (1979)
- Syntax (1981)
- Grammatical Theory in the United States from Bloomfield to Chomsky (1993)
- A Short History of Structural Linguistics (2001)
- Linguistics: A Very Short Introduction (2003) Oxford University Press, Oxford ISBN 9780192801487
- The Concise Oxford Dictionary of Linguistics (2005, 3rd revd edition 2014) Oxford University Press, Oxford ISBN 978-0-19-967512-8
- Syntactic Relations: A Critical Survey (2007)
- The Positions of Adjectives in English (2014) Oxford University Press, Oxford ISBN 978-0-19-968159-4
- What Graeco-Roman Grammar was About (2019) Oxford University Press, Oxford ISBN 019256577X
