= Christopher Butler (literary scholar) =

English literature academic (1940–2020)

(Ian) Christopher Butler (1940 – 18 March 2020) was an English literature academic. An expert on modernism, he was Professor of English Language and Literature at Christ Church, Oxford.

He died at the John Radcliffe Hospital in Oxford on 18 March 2020.

== Selected works ==
- Number Symbolism. London: Routledge & K. Paul, 1970.
- (ed. with Alasdair Fowler) Topics in criticism: an ordered set of positions in literary theory. Harlow: Longman, 1971.
- After the wake : an essay on the contemporary avant-garde. Oxford: Clarendon Press, 1980.
- Interpretation, deconstruction, and ideology : an introduction to some current issues in literary theory. Oxford: Clarendon Press, 1984.
- Early modernism : literature music and painting in Europe, 1900-1916. Oxford: Clarendon Press, 1994.
- 'The 'Idea' in Philosophy and in Literature', REAL: Yearbook of Research in English and American Literature, Vol. 13 (1997)
- Postmodernism: a very short introduction. New York, Oxford: Oxford University Press, 2002.
- Pleasure and the arts : enjoying literature, painting, and music. Oxford: Oxford University Press, 2005.
- (ed. with Judith Curthoys and Brian Young) Christ Church, Oxford: A Portrait of the House. Third Millennium Publishing, 2006.
- Modernism: a very short introduction. New York, Oxford: Oxford University Press, 2010.
