= Raymond Wacks =

Hong Kong legal scholar

Raymond Wacks is Emeritus Professor of Law and Legal Theory at the University of Hong Kong, where he was Head of the Department of Law from 1986 to 1993. He was previously Professor of Public Law and Head of the Department of Public Law at the University of Natal in Durban. He retired at the end of 2001, and now lives in Lincolnshire.

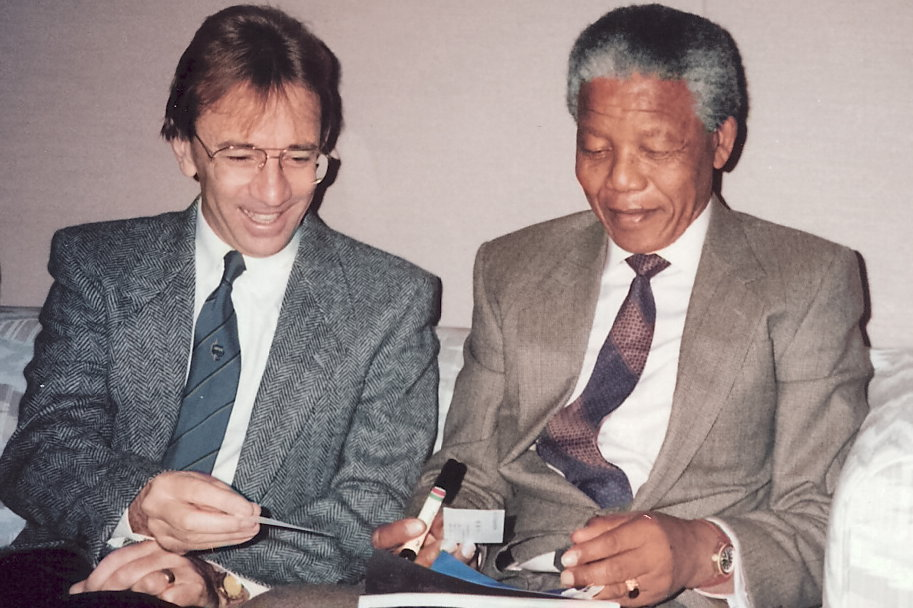
With Nelson Mandela in 1991

== Education ==
Educated at the University of the Witwatersrand, (B.A., LLB.); the London School of Economics (LL.M.); University College, Oxford (M.Litt.); and the University of London (PhD), his major areas of expertise are legal philosophy, and human rights, in particular the protection of privacy on which he is a leading international authority. In 1997 a higher doctorate in law (LL.D.) was conferred on him by the University of London for his publications on privacy and legal philosophy. His books have been translated into numerous languages including Arabic, Greek, Chinese, Indonesian, Italian, Portuguese, Turkish, Japanese, Thai, Korean, Slovene, and Georgian.

== Privacy ==
Professor Wacks' major works on privacy include: The Protection of Privacy published in 1980 by Sweet & Maxwell; Personal Information: Privacy and the Law, published in 1989 by Oxford University Press; Privacy, a two-volume collection of essays published in 1993 by Dartmouth, London and New York University Press; Privacy and Press Freedom published by Blackstone Press, London in 1995. In 2013 Privacy and Media Freedom was published, and in 2015 the second edition of Privacy: A Very Short Introduction appeared (both published by Oxford University Press). An Italian translation was published in 2016 by Monti & Ambrosini. In 2019 Protecting Personal Information: The Right to Privacy Reconsidered was published by Hart Publishing, co-authored by Andrea Monti. Wacks is a former chairman of the committee of the Law Reform Commission of Hong Kong that examined this subject, and was a member of the statutory Personal Data (Privacy) Advisory Committee.

== Legal philosophy ==
The seventh edition of his Understanding Jurisprudence: An Introduction to Legal Theory will be published by Oxford University Press in 2026. The book has been translated into Chinese and Turkish. In 2006, Oxford University Press published his Philosophy of Law: A Very Short Introduction, the second edition of which appeared in 2014. In 2008, his second book in this series, Law: A Very Short Introduction was published; the third edition appeared in 2023.

== Hong Kong ==
In addition to publishing articles and books on these subjects, he has edited a number of collections of essays on various aspects of Hong Kong law, including Civil Liberties in Hong Kong, The Future of the Law in Hong Kong, The Law in Hong Kong 1969–1989, and Human Rights in Hong Kong (all published by Oxford University Press), Hong Kong, China, and 1997: Essays in Legal Theory, and The New Legal Order in Hong Kong published by Hong Kong University Press. A collection of his writings, Law, Morality, and the Private Domain was published by Hong Kong University Press in 2000. Wacks has also written numerous articles on aspects of Hong Kong's legal system, including questions raised by the Basic Law of the Hong Kong Special Administrative Region, especially the judicial function and the problems of legal continuity after 1997. He was for several years editor of the Hong Kong Law Journal, and presented the RTHK television and radio programme, The Week in Politics.

== Fiction ==
His novel, White Lies, set in the 1960s in South Africa, was published in November 2010.

== Books (as author) ==
- The Protection of Privacy, Modern Legal Studies (Sweet & Maxwell, 1980).
- Jurisprudence (Blackstone Press, 1987; second edition, 1990; third edition, 1993; fourth edition, 1995; fifth edition, 1999).
- Personal Information: Privacy and the Law (Oxford University Press, 1989). (Paperback edition, 1993).
- Privacy and Press Freedom (Blackstone Press, 1995).
- Data Privacy Law in Hong Kong (with M Berthold) (Sweet & Maxwell 1997, reprinted 2000).
- Hong Kong Data Privacy Law: Territorial Regulation in a Borderless World (with M Berthold) (Sweet & Maxwell, 2003).
- Law, Morality, and the Private Domain (Hong Kong: Hong Kong University Press, 2000).
- Understanding Jurisprudence: An Introduction to Legal Theory (Oxford University Press, 2005, second edition, 2009; third edition, 2012; fourth edition, 2015; fifth edition, 2017; sixth edition, 2020, seventh edition, 2026).
- Philosophy of Law: A Very Short Introduction (Oxford University Press, 2006; second edition, 2014).
- Law: A Very Short Introduction (Oxford University Press, 2008, second edition, 2015, third edition, 2023).
- Privacy: A Very Short Introduction (Oxford University Press, 2010, second edition 2015).
- Privacy and Media Freedom (Oxford University Press, 2013).
- Justice: A Beginner's Guide (Oneworld Publications, 2017).
- Protecting Personal Information: The Right to Privacy Reconsidered (with Andrea Monti) (Bloomsbuty/Hart Publishing, 2019).
- COVID-19 and Public Policy in the Digital Age (with Andrea Monti) (Routledge, 2020).
- National Security in the New World Order: Government and the Technology of Information (with Andrea Monti) (Routledge, 2021).
- The Rule of Law Under Fire (Bloomsbury/Hart Publishing, 2021, second edition, 2026).
- Animal Lives Matter: The Continuing Quest for Justice (Routledge, 2024).

== Books (as editor) ==
- Civil Liberties in Hong Kong (Oxford University Press, 1988).
- The Future of the Law in Hong Kong (Oxford University Press 1989).
- The Law in Hong Kong: 1969–1989 (Oxford University Press 1989).
- The Future of Legal Education and the Legal Profession in Hong Kong (Faculty of Law, University of Hong Kong, 1989).
- Hong Kong's Bill of Rights: Problems and Prospects (Faculty of Law, University of Hong Kong, 1990).
- Human Rights in Hong Kong (Oxford University Press, 1992).
- Police Powers in Hong Kong (Faculty of Law, University of Hong Kong, 1993).
- Hong Kong, China, and 1997: Essays in Legal Theory (Hong Kong University Press, 1993). Reprinted with corrections, 1994.
- Privacy (two volumes) The International Library of Essays in Law and Legal Theory (New York University Press, 1993). Volume I: The Concept of Privacy. Volume II: Privacy and the Law.
- The Right to Representation: Problems and Prospects (Faculty of Law, University of Hong Kong, 1994).
- The New Legal Order in Hong Kong (Hong Kong University Press, 1999).

== Notable essays and articles ==
- ‘The Poverty of “Privacy”’ (1980) 96 Law Quarterly Review 73.
- ‘Privacy and the Practitioner’ (1983) Public Law 260.
- ‘Judges and Injustice’ (1984) 101 South African Law Journal 266.
- ‘Judging Judges’ (1984) 101 South African Law Journal 295–300 (in reply to J Dugard, ‘Should Judges Resign? – A Reply to Professor Wacks'(1984) 101 South African Law Journal 286).
- ‘Can the Common Law Survive the Basic Law?’ (1988) 18 Hong Kong Law Journal 435.
- ‘Apartheid and the Judicial Conscience: The Dilemma of the Moral Judge in an Unjust Legal System’ (1988) 12 Bulletin of the Australian Society of Legal Philosophy 221.
- ‘The Right to Privacy’ in R Wacks (ed), Civil Liberties in Hong Kong (Oxford University Press, 1988).
- ‘The Judicial Function’ in R Wacks (ed), The Future of the Law in Hong Kong (Oxford University Press, 1989).
- ‘Judges and Moral Responsibility’ in W Sadurski (ed), Ethical Dimensions of Legal Theory, Poznan Studies in the Philosophy of the Sciences and Humanities (Rodopi, 1991) 111.
- ‘Privacy’ in R Wacks (ed), Human Rights in Hong Kong (Oxford University Press, 1991).
- ‘Empire’s Law: Hong Kong’s Colonial Bill of Rights’ (1993) 3 Journal of South African Law 384.
- ‘One Country, Two Grundnormen? The Basic Norm and the Basic Law’ in Raymond Wacks (ed), Hong Kong, China and 1997: Essays in Legal Theory (Hong Kong University Press, 1993).
- ‘The End of Human Rights?’ (1994) 24 Hong Kong Law Journal 372.
- ‘Approaching the Bench: The Future of the Judiciary in Hong Kong’ (1994) 24 Hong Kong Law Journal 24.
- ‘Data Privacy: Reforming the Law’ (1996) 26 Hong Kong Law Journal 149.
- ‘The Basic Law on Trial’ (1997) 28 Hong Kong Law Journal 300.
- ‘Sacrificed for Science: Are Animal Experiments Morally Defensible?’ in Gerhold K Becker (ed) in association with James P Buchanan, Changing Nature’s Course: The Ethical Challenge of Biotechnology (Hong Kong University Press, 1996) 37.
- ‘Privacy in Cyberspace: Personal Information, Free Speech, and the Internet’ in Peter Birks (ed), Privacy and Loyalty (Oxford: Clarendon Press, 1997) 93.
- ‘The Future of the Common Law’ (1997) 27 Hong Kong Law Journal 129.
- ‘Law’s Umpire: Judges, Truth, and Moral Accountability’ in Peter Koller and André-Jean Arnaud, Law, Justice, and Culture (Stuttgart: Franz Steiner Verlag, 1998).
- ‘Pursuing Paparazzi: Privacy and Intrusive Photography’ (1998) 28 Hong Kong Law Journal 1.
- ‘Privacy and Process’ (1999) 29 Hong Kong Law Journal 117.
- ‘Towards a New Legal and Conceptual Framework for the Protection of Internet Privacy’ (1999) 3 Irish Intellectual Property Review 1.
- ‘Privacy and Press Freedom: Oil on Troubled Waters’ (1999) 4 Media and Arts Law Review 259.
- ‘Domestic Helpers’ Privacy’ (2000) 30 Hong Kong Law Journal 361
- ‘What has Data Protection to do with Privacy?’ (2000) 6 Privacy Law and Policy Reporter 143.
- ‘Confronting Dogma: Privacy, Free Speech, and the Internet’ (2000) 27 Media Asia 63.
- ‘Privacy and Anonymity’ (2000) 30 Hong Kong Law Journal 177.
- ‘A Face in the Crowd: Does Photographing a Nobody Violate Fair Information Practice?’ (2000) 5 Media and Arts Law Review 187.
- ‘Our Flagging Rights’ (2000) 30 Hong Kong Law Journal 1.
- ‘Privacy Reconceived: Protecting Personal Information in a Digital World’ in Eli Lederman & Ron Shapira, (eds), Law, Information and Information Technology (The Hague: Kluwer Law International, Law and Electronic Commerce series, 2001) 75.
- ‘Why There Will Never Be An English Common Law Privacy Tort’ in Megan Richardson and Andrew Kenyon, (eds), New Directions in Privacy Law (Cambridge University Press, 2006.)
- ‘Injustice in Robes: Iniquity and Judicial Accountability’(2009) 22 Ratio Juris 128.
- ‘The Knesset and the Court’ The Montréal Review, September 2023.
- ‘Judging Jerusalem: South Africa vs Israel’ The Montréal Review, January 2024.
- 'What Do We Owe Animals?' The Montréal Review, May 2024
- ‘Complicity or Complacency: Judging Judges in Authoritarian States’ The Montréal Review, June 2024.
- ‘The New Crusade’ The Montréal Review, December 2024.
