= Stephen Gaukroger =

British historian

Stephen Gaukroger FAHA, FRHS, FRSA, FRSN
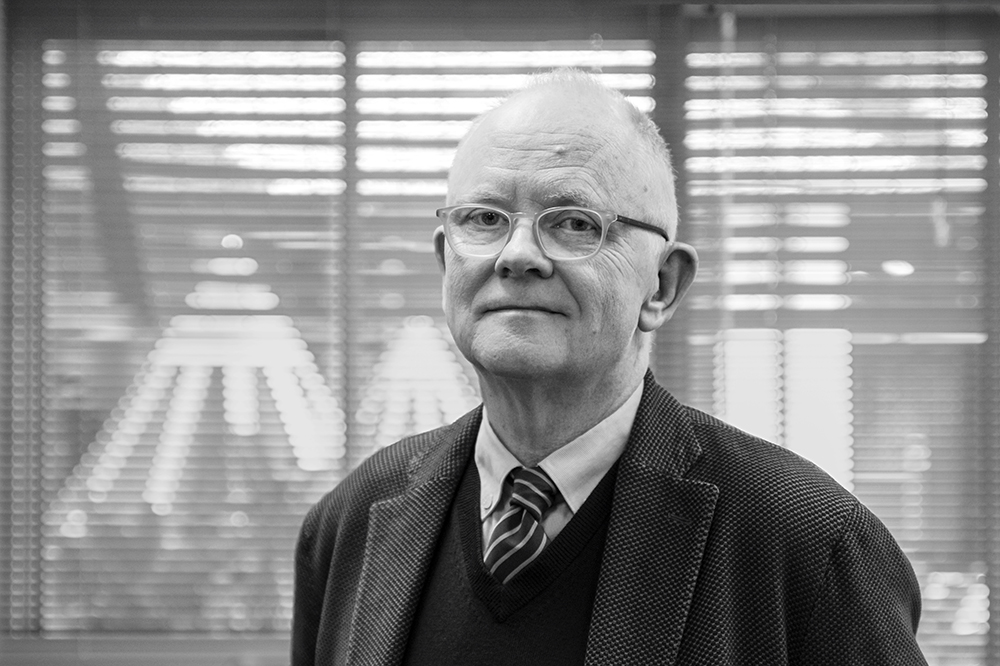
- Born: July 9, 1950
- Died: September 3, 2023 (aged 73)
- Occupations: Historian of Philosophy and Science

Stephen Gaukroger (July 9, 1950 – September 3, 2023) was a British historian of philosophy and science who spent the majority of his academic career in Australia. Gaukroger was Emeritus Professor of History of Philosophy and History of Science at the University of Sydney.

== Life ==
Stephen Gaukroger was born on 9 July 1950, in Oldham, Lancashire, and educated at Cardinal Langley Grammar School. He studied Philosophy at Birkbeck College, University of London, where he was awarded first class honours with the official congratulations of the Board of Examiners. He was a graduate student at Darwin College, Cambridge, completing his PhD in 1977 in the Department of History and Philosophy of Science.

In 1977 he was elected to a research fellowship at Clare Hall, Cambridge, and at the end of 1978 moved to a research fellowship at the University of Melbourne. In 1981 he took up a lectureship in philosophy at the University of Sydney. He married Helen Irving in 1980. He divided his time between Sydney and London.

== Honours ==
Gaukroger was elected a Fellow of the Australian Academy of Humanities in 1992, a Fellow of the Royal Society of New South Wales in 2016, a Fellow of the Royal Historical Society in 2016, corresponding member of l’Académie Internationale d’Histoire des Sciences in 2007 and full member in 2016. In 2003 he was awarded the Australian Centenary Medal for contributions to history of philosophy and history of science.

== Works ==
Books

- Explanatory Structures: Concepts of Explanation in Early Physics and Philosophy. Brighton: Harvester Press, 1978. ISBN 0855277238
- Cartesian Logic: An Essay on Descartes’ Conception of Inference. Oxford: Oxford University Press, 1989. ISBN 0-19-824825-3
- Arnauld: On True and False Ideas. Manchester: Manchester University Press, 1990. ISBN 0-7190-3203-2
- Descartes, An Intellectual Biography. Oxford: Oxford University Press, 1995. ISBN 0-19-823994-7
- Descartes: The World and Other Writings. Cambridge: Cambridge University Press, 1998. ISBN 0-521-63158-0
- Francis Bacon and the Transformation of Early-Modern Philosophy. Cambridge: Cambridge University Press, 2001. ISBN 0-521-80154-0
- Descartes’ System of Natural Philosophy. Cambridge: Cambridge University Press, 2002. ISBN 0-521-80897-9 Review
- The Emergence of a Scientific Culture: Science and the Shaping of Modernity, 1210-1685. Oxford: Oxford University Press, 2006. ISBN 0-19-929644-8
- The Collapse of Mechanism and the Rise of Sensibility: Science and the Shaping of Modernity, 1680-1760. Oxford: Oxford University Press, 2010. ISBN 978-0-19-959493-1
- Objectivity: A Very Short Introduction. Oxford: Oxford University Press, 2012. ISBN 978-0-19-960669-6
- with Frédérique Aït-Touati. Le monde en images. Voir, représenter, savoir, de Descartes à Leibniz. Paris: Classiques Garnier, 2015. ISBN 978-2-8124-2589-9
- The Natural and the Human: Science and the Shaping of Modernity, 1739-1841, Oxford: Oxford University Press, 2016. ISBN 978-0-19-875763-4
- Civilization and the Culture of Science: Science and the Shaping of Modernity, 1795-1935, Oxford: Oxford University Press, 2020.
- The Failures of Philosophy: A Historical Essay, Princeton University Press, November 3, 2020.

Books edited

- Descartes: Philosophy, Mathematics and Physics. Brighton: Harvester Press, 1980. ISBN 0-85527-798-X
- The Uses of Antiquity: The Scientific Revolution and the Classical Tradition. Dordrecht & Boston: Kluwer, 1991. ISBN 0-7923-1130-2
- The Soft Underbelly of Reason: The Passions in the Seventeenth-Century. London: Routledge, 1998. ISBN 0-415-17054-0
- with John Schuster and John Sutton. Descartes’ Natural Philosophy. London: Routledge, 2000. ISBN 0-415-21993-0
- with Conal Condren and Ian Hunter. The Philosopher in Early Modern Europe: The Nature of a Contested Identity. Cambridge: Cambridge University Press, 2006. ISBN 0-521-86646-4
- The Blackwell Guide to Descartes’ Meditations. Oxford: Blackwell, 2006. ISBN 1-4051-1875-X
- with Catherine Wilson. Descartes and Cartesianism: Essays in Honour of Desmond Clarke. Oxford: Oxford University Press, 2017. ISBN 978-0-19-877964-3
- with Delphine Antoine-Mahut. Descartes’ Treatise on Man and its Reception. New York: Springer, 2017. ISBN 978-3-319-46987-4
- Knowledge in Modern Philosophy, London: Bloomsbury, 2018. ISBN 978-1-474-25887-6

Written introduction

- Charles Bonnet, Analytical Essay on the Faculties of the Soul. Oxford University Press, 2022.
