= Dana Arnold =

British professor of architectural history

Dana Arnold FSA
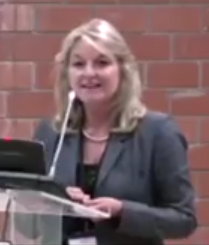
- Professor Arnold in 2016
- Born: 22 June 1961 (age 65)

Academic work
- Discipline: Art historian
- Sub-discipline: Architectural history; Architecture of London; Architecture of the Middle East (encompassing: Islamic; Ottoman; and Persian architectures); urbanism
- Institutions: University of Leeds; University of Southampton; University of Middlesex; University of East Anglia

Dana Rebecca Arnold, FSA (born 22 June 1961) is a British art historian and academic, specialising in architectural history. Since 2016, she has been Professor of Art History at the University of East Anglia. She previously taught at the University of Leeds, the University of Southampton and the University of Middlesex.

== Early life and education ==
Arnold was born on 22 June 1961. She studied at Westfield College, London, graduating with a Bachelor of Arts (BA) degree in 1983. She attended the Bartlett School of Architecture, University College London, graduating with a Master of Science (MSc) degree in 1984, and a Doctor of Philosophy (PhD) degree in 1997 or 1998. Her doctoral thesis was titled "The architect and the metropolis: the work of James and Decimus Burton in London and Dublin, c. 1800-1840".

== Academic career ==
Dana started her academic career at the University of Leeds where she was senior lecturer in its Department of Fine Art from 1994 to 1999, and Director of the Centre for Studies in Architecture and the Decorative Arts. From 1999 to 2012, she was Professor of Architectural History at the University of Southampton. She was also head of research for its School of Humanities between 2003 and 2012. From 2012 to 2016, she was Professor of Architectural History and Theory at the University of Middlesex. and director of its Centre for Ideas. In 2016, she moved to the University of East Anglia where she had been appointed Professor of Art History.

Arnold was a guest professor at Tianjin University in China, and honorary professor at the Middle East Technical University in Ankara, Turkey. She has published books, essays and articles on architecture, architectural history, imperialism and historiography. Arnold describes her research as a:

"renegotiation of the boundaries of architectural history; to critically engage with past and present histories and disclose latent assumptions about ‘east’ and ‘west’ through the biases and absences in the writing of architectural and cultural histories."

On 4 April 2006, Arnold was elected a Fellow of the Society of Antiquaries of London (FSA).

== Selected publications ==
- A Short Book About Art, May 2015.
- The Spaces of the Hospital: Spatiality and Urban Change in London 1680-1820. Routledge, London, 2013.
- Rethinking Architectural Historiography, editors: Dana Arnold, Elvan Altan Ergot, Belgin Turan Ozkaya, Routledge, London, 2006
- Rural Urbanism: London landscapes in the early nineteenth century. Manchester University Press, 2006.
- Cultural identities and the aesthetics of Britishness, editor, Manchester University Press, 2004
- Tracing Architecture: The Aesthetics of Antiquarianism, Wiley & Sons Publishers, 2003
- Art History: A Very Short Introduction. Oxford University Press, Oxford, 2004.
- Reading Architectural History. Routledge, London, 2002.
- Re-presenting the Metropolis: Architecture, Urban Experience and Social Life in London 1800-1840. Ashgate, Aldershot, 2000.
- The Georgian Country House: Architecture Landscape and Society. Sutton Publishing, Stroud, 1998.
