= Christopher J. Berry =

British philosopher

Christopher Berry
- Born: 1946 (age 79–80)
- Awards: FRSE

Education
- Education: London School of Economics (PhD), University of Nottingham (BA)

Philosophical work
- Era: 21st-century philosophy
- Region: Western philosophy
- Institutions: University of Glasgow

Christopher J Berry FRSE (born 1946) is a British political philosopher and professor emeritus of Political Theory and honorary professorial research fellow at the University of Glasgow.

== Books ==
- Hume, Hegel and Human Nature (Martinus Nijhoff, 1982).
- Human Nature (Macmillan, 1986).
- The Idea of Democratic Community (Wheatsheaf Books, 1989)
- The Idea of Luxury: A Conceptual and Historical Investigation (Cambridge: 1994); Chinese translation (Century Publishing Group, Beijing, 2005).
- Social Theory of the Scottish Enlightenment (Edinburgh,1997) Chinese Translation (ZheJiang University Press, 2013). Forthcoming Japanese Translation.
- David Hume (Bloomsbury: New York & London 2009)
- Idea of Commercial Society in the Scottish Enlightenment. ( Edinburgh,2013). Japanese translation (Minerva) and Chinese (Zhejiang UP) forthcoming.
- Editor (with M. Paganelli & C.Smith) & author of 2 essays in Oxford Handbook of Adam Smith (Oxford, 2013).
