= Carl Abbott (urban historian) =

American historian (born 1944)

- Born: December 3, 1944 (age 81)
- Known for: Studies of American urban development and western cities
- Spouse: Margery Post Abbott
- Awards: Urban History Association Book Award (1993); Society for American City and Regional Planning History Book Award (1999)

Academic background
- Education: Swarthmore College (BA, 1966); University of Chicago (PhD, 1971)
- Thesis: (1971)

Academic work
- Discipline: Urban history; Urban planning; Western American history; Science fiction studies
- Institutions: University of Denver (1971–1972); Old Dominion University (1972–1978); Portland State University (1978–2012)
- Website: theurbanwest.com

Carl Abbott (born December 3, 1944) is an American urban historian with research interests in the modern American West, the Sun Belt, Portland, and the cultural imagination of cities, and he is professor emeritus of urban studies and planning at Portland State University.

He served as president of the Urban History Association and of the Pacific Coast Branch of the American Historical Association, and has co-edited both the Journal of the American Planning Association and Pacific Historical Review.

== Early life and education ==
Abbott was born in Knoxville, Tennessee, on December 3, 1944, and earned a B.A. in history from Swarthmore College in 1966 before completing an M.A. (1967) and Ph.D. (1971) at the University of Chicago.

== Career ==
His academic positions have included the University of Denver (1971–72), Old Dominion University (1972–78), and Portland State University (1978–2012). He has also held visiting positions at Mesa University, George Washington University, and the University of Oregon.

He served as president of the Urban History Association (1995), has been a member of the American Historical Association since 1982 and served as president of its Pacific Coach Branch from 2012 until 2013. Other professional service has included co-editorship of the journal of the American Planning Association from 1999 to 2004 and of the Pacific Historical Review from 1997 to 2014.

== Writing ==
Abbott has authored or co-authored sixteen books. The Metropolitan Frontier: Cities in the Modern American West (1993) received the book award of the Urban History Association and Political Terrain: Washington D.C. from Tidewater Town to Global Metropolis (1999) received the book award of the Society for American City and Regional Planning History. He has also published many scholarly articles, chapters, and reviews as well as shorter essays for general readers on his website.

Abbott is also active in fields of public history, working with Portland's Architectural Heritage Center, The Oregon Encyclopedia, the Oregon Historical Society, and other organizations and is an advocate of community-based history.

=== Works ===
- Colorado: The History of the Centennial State. Colorado Associated University Press, Boulder 1976. 5th ed., 2013 (with Stephen Leonard and Tom Noel): University of Colorado Press, Boulder, 2013, ISBN 9781607322269.
- The Great Extravaganza: Portland and the Lewis and Clark Exposition. Oregon Historical Society, Portland, 1981, ISBN 0875950884.
- Boosters and Businessmen: Popular Economic Thought and Urban Growth in the Antebellum Middle West. Greenwood Press, Westport CT 1981, ISBN 0313225621.
- The New Urban America: Growth and Politics in Sunbelt Cities. University of North Carolina Press, 1981. Revised ed., 1987, ISBN 0807841803.
- Portland: Planning, Politics, and Growth in a Twentieth Century City. University of Nebraska Press, Lincoln, 1983, ISBN 0803210086.
- Urban America in the Modern Age, 1920 to Present. H. Davidson, Arlington Heights IL, 1987. 2nd ed., 2007, ISBN 9780882952475.
- The Metropolitan Frontier: Cities in the Modern American West. University of Arizona Press, Tucson, 1993, ISBN 0816511292.
- Planning a New West: The Columbia River Gorge National Scenic Area (with Sy Adler and Margery Post Abbott). Oregon State University Press, Corvallis, 1997. ISBN 0870713922.
- Political Terrain: Washington, D.C., from Tidewater Town to Global Metropolis. University of North Carolina Press, Chapel Hill, 1999, ISBN 080782478X.
- Greater Portland: Urban Life and Landscape in the Pacific Northwest. University of Pennsylvania Press, Philadelphia, 2001, ISBN 0812236122.
- Two Centuries of Lewis and Clark: Reflections on the Voyage of Discovery (with William L. Lang). Oregon Historical Society Press, Portland, 2004, ISBN 0875952887.
- Frontiers Past and Future: Science Fiction and the American West. University Press of Kansas, Lawrence, 2006, ISBN 0700614303.
- How Cities Won the West: Four Centuries of Urban Change in Western North America. University of New Mexico Press, Albuquerque, 2008, ISBN 9780826333148.
- Portland in Three Centuries: The Place and the People. Oregon State University Press, Corvallis 2011. ISBN 9780870716133
- Imagined Frontiers: Contemporary America and Beyond. University of Oklahoma Press, Norman 2015, ISBN 978-0806148366
- Imagining Urban Futures: Cities in Science Fiction and What We Might Learn from Them. Wesleyan University Press, Middletown, CT 2016. ISBN 9780819576712

== Personal life ==
Since 1967, Carl has been married to Margery Post Abbott, a Quaker scholar and teacher.
