= Jeremy Moon (academic) =

British academic (born 1955)

Jeremy Moon (born 1955) is a British academic.

Moon earned a bachelor's of arts degree in politics from the University of Exeter, and completed a doctoral degree in the subject from the same institution. He has taught at the University of Nottingham, the University of North London, the University of Western Australia, the University of Strathclyde, the University of Keele, and the Copenhagen Business School, where he was the Velux Professor of Corporate Sustainability. Moon has also held the Gourlay Visiting Professorship of Ethics in Business at Trinity College, University of Melbourne. In 2005, the Aspen Institute awarded Moon its Faculty Pioneer Award.
