= Very Short Introductions =

Oxford University Press book series

- Author: Various
- Country: United Kingdom
- Language: English
- Publisher: Oxford University Press
- Published: 1995–present
- Media type: Print (paperback), e-book
- No. of books: 800+ (List of books)
- OCLC: 911799103
- Website: www.veryshortintroductions.com

Very Short Introductions (VSI) is a book series published by the Oxford University Press (OUP). The books are concise introductions to particular subjects, intended for a general audience but written by experts. Most are under 200-pages long. While authors may present personal viewpoints, the books are meant to be "balanced and complete" as well as thought provoking.

The series began in 1995, and by December 2025 there were over 800 titles published or announced. The books have been commercially successful, and have been published in more than 25 languages. Institutions can subscribe to an online service to allow their users to read the books.

Most of the books have been written specifically for the series, but around 60 were recycled from earlier OUP publications: several had been in OUP's Past Masters series, and numbers 17–24 used chapters from The Oxford Illustrated History of Britain (1984).

Each book of the series is numbered on its spine. These numbers broadly, but not exactly, correspond with the publication dates. Two books have been removed from the series: #60, "Shakespeare" by Germaine Greer was replaced by "William Shakespeare" by Stanley Wells; and #116, "Anarchism" by Colin Ward was replaced by "Anarchism" by Alex Prichard.

The cover art for the series was originally the work of Philip Atkins, who painted over 300 of the publication's abstract covers. After his death in 2008, artist Joanna Usherwood became the credited cover artist, painting over 200 additional works.

== Reception ==
Writing in the New Yorker in 2017, Kathryn Schulz praised the diversity of topics covered but noted significant gaps in coverage, including an absence of women and people of colour in its 54 biographies and "a British bias in the choice of subjects". Schulz also described the quality of the books as variable, favourably comparing the books written about Teeth, Deserts and Robotics against those written on Mountains, Home and Archaeology.

In the Fortnightly Review, Michelene Wandor said that the series "successfully bridged the gap between academic and trade publishing" and reviewed six volumes.

== List of books in the series ==
See List of Very Short Introductions books.

== Boxed sets ==
Six boxed sets, each with a different theme, were released in 2006. Five books from the series on the given theme were included, plus the series' promotional volume A Very Short Introduction to Everything.

- The Ballot Box
  - Politics (008)
  - Capitalism (108)
  - Democracy (075)
  - Socialism (126)
  - Fascism (077)
- The Brain Box
  - Evolution (100)
  - Consciousness (121)
  - Intelligence (039)
  - Cosmology (051)
  - Quantum Theory (069)
- The Thought Box
  - Hegel (049)
  - Marx (028)
  - Nietzsche (034)
  - Schopenhauer (062)
  - Kierkegaard (058)
- The Basics Box
  - Philosophy (055)
  - Mathematics (066)
  - History (016)
  - Politics (008)
  - Psychology (006)
- The Boom Box
  - Ancient Warfare (117)
  - Cold War (087)
  - Crusades (140)
  - French Revolution (054)
  - Spanish Civil War (123)
- The Picture Box
  - Art History (102)
  - Renaissance Art (129)
  - Modern Art (120)
  - Architecture (072)
  - Design (136)

== See also ==
- Fontana Modern Masters, a similar series on 20th century thinkers.
- Découvertes Gallimard, a similar series in French of introductory books written by experts, started in 1986, noted for its fine illustration. Some titles are translated in other languages.
- Introducing..._(book_series), a similar series of guides presented in an illustrated format.
- For Dummies, a series of instructional reference books and beginners guides with a focus on the practical aspects or application of various topics.
- MIT Press Essential Knowledge series
- Que sais-je?, a similar series in French of introductory books written by experts, started in 1941. Some titles are translated in other languages.
- Rough Guides, whose non-travel books also cover culture and science.
- Teach Yourself, a similar series published by Hodder Education
