= Making Mathematics with Needlework =

2008 mathematics and fiber arts book

Making Mathematics with Needlework: Ten Papers and Ten Projects
- Cover of CRC Press reprint
- Editor: Sarah-Marie Belcastro; Carolyn Yackel
- Language: English
- Publisher: A K Peters
- Publication date: 2008

Making Mathematics with Needlework: Ten Papers and Ten Projects is an edited volume on mathematics and fiber arts. It was edited by Sarah-Marie Belcastro and Carolyn Yackel, and published in 2008 by A K Peters, based on a meeting held in 2005 in Atlanta by the American Mathematical Society.

== Topics ==
The book includes ten different mathematical fiber arts projects, by eight contributors. An introduction provides a history of the connections between mathematics, mathematics education, and the fiber arts. Each of its ten project chapters is illustrated by many color photographs and diagrams, and is organized into four sections: an overview of the project, a section on the mathematics connected to it, a section of ideas for using the project as a teaching activity, and directions for constructing the project. Although there are some connections between topics, they can be read independently of each other, in any order. The thesis of the book is that directed exercises in fiber arts construction can help teach both mathematical visualization and concepts from three-dimensional geometry.

The book uses knitting, crochet, sewing, and cross-stitch, but deliberately avoids weaving as a topic already well-covered in mathematical fiber arts publications. Projects in the book include a quilt in the form of a Möbius strip, a "bidirectional hat" connected to the theory of Diophantine equations, a shawl with a fractal design, a knitted torus connecting to discrete approximations of curvature, a sampler demonstrating different forms of symmetry in wallpaper group, "algebraic socks" with connections to modular arithmetic and the Klein four-group, a one-sided purse sewn together following a description by Lewis Carroll, a demonstration of braid groups on a cable-knit pillow, an embroidered graph drawing of an Eulerian graph, and topological pants.

Beyond belcastro and Yackel, the contributors to the book include Susan Goldstine, Joshua Holden, Lana Holden, Mary D. Shepherd, Amy F. Szczepański, and D. Jacob Wildstrom.

== Audience and reception ==
Reviewers had mixed opinions on the appropriate audience for the book and its success in targeting that audience. Ketty Peeva writes that the book is "of interest to mathematicians, mathematics educators and crafters", and Mary Fortune writes that a wide group of people would enjoy browsing its contents, However, Kate Atherley warns that it is "not for the faint-of-heart" (either among mathematicians or crafters), and Mary Goetting complains that the audience for the book is not clearly defined, and is inconsistent across the book, with some chapters written for professional mathematicians and others for mathematical beginners. She writes that most readers will have to pick and choose among the chapters for material appealing to them. Similarly, reviewer Michelle Sipics writes that in aiming at multiple audiences, the book "sacrifices some accessibility". And although reviewer Gwen Fisher downplays the potential pedagogical applications of this book, complaining that its teaching ideas do not provide enough detail to be usable, and are not a good fit for typical teaching curricula, Sipics calls mathematics teachers "perhaps the greatest beneficiaries of this text".

Fortune writes that, though the book increased her appreciation of and understanding of needlework, she didn't gain much new mathematical insight from reading it. In contrast, Fisher argues that by using only "straightforward applications of traditional needlework skills" the book is accessible even to beginners in the fiber arts, and that the book is "much more about maths than about fibre technique". The real value of the book, she argues, is in the scholarly connection it forges between traditional women's activities and mathematics. Pao-Sheng Hsu says that it would be "a great coffee table book" for browsing. And Anna Lena Phillips calls the book "an excellent synthesis" of textile crafts and mathematics, providing inspiration to those interested in either topic.
