= Yackel =

Yackel is a surname. Notable people with the surname include:

- Carolyn Yackel (fl. 1998), American mathematician
- Erna Beth Yackel (1939–2022), American college professor
- Ken Yackel (1930–1991), American ice hockey player
