= Sarah-marie belcastro =

American mathematician and book author

Sarah-marie belcastro (born 1970), stylized sarah-marie belcastro, is an American mathematician and book author. She is an instructor at the Art of Problem Solving Online School and is the director of MathILy, a residential math summer program hosted at Bryn Mawr College. Although her doctoral research was in algebraic geometry, she has also worked extensively in topological graph theory. She is known for and has written extensively about mathematical knitting, and has co-edited three books on fiber mathematics. She exclusively uses the form "sarah-marie belcastro".

== Biography ==
Belcastro was born in San Diego, California, in 1970, and grew up mostly in Andover, Massachusetts, and in Dubuque, Iowa. She earned a B.S. (1991) in Mathematics and Astronomy from Haverford College, an M.S. (1993) from The University of Michigan, Ann Arbor, and a Ph.D. (1997) there for a thesis on “Picard Lattices of Families of K3 Surfaces” done with Igor Dolgachev.

Since 2012, she has also been an instructor at the Art of Problem Solving Online School. Since 2013, she has been the director of Bryn Mawr College's residential summer program MathILy (serious Mathematics Infused with Levity). She is also a guest faculty member at Sarah Lawrence College.

She was Associate Editor for The College Mathematics Journal (2003–2019). She has also lectured frequently at the University of Massachusetts, Amherst since 2012.

== Selected publications ==
=== Books ===
- Discrete Mathematics with Ducks (AK Peters, 2012; 2nd ed., CRC Press, 2019, ISBN 978-1-315-16767-1).
- Figuring Fibers, edited by belcastro and Carolyn Yackel, Providence, R.I.: American Mathematics Society, 2018.
- Crafting by Concepts: fiber arts and mathematics, edited by belcastro and Yackel. AK Peters, 2011.
- Making Mathematics with Needlework: Ten Papers and Ten Projects, edited by belcastro and Yackel. Wellesley, Mass.: AK Peters, 2007.

=== Journal papers ===
- belcastro, sarah-marie (2021). "Color-induced subgraphs dual to Hamilton cycles of embedded cubic graphs" (PDF). Australasian Journal of Combinatorics. 81: 319–333. MR 4312576.
- belcastro, sarah-marie (2016). "Small snarks and 6-chromatic triangulations on the Klein bottle" (PDF). Australasian Journal of Combinatorics. 65: 232–250. MR 3509660.
- belcastro, sarah-marie; Haas, Ruth (2015). "Triangle-free uniquely 3-edge colorable cubic graphs". Contributions to Discrete Mathematics. 10 (2): 39–44. arXiv:1508.06934. doi:10.11575/cdm.v10i2.62320. MR 3499076.
- Albertson, Michael O.; Alpert, Hannah; belcastro, sarah-marie; Haas, Ruth (2010). "Grünbaum colorings of toroidal triangulations". Journal of Graph Theory. 63 (1): 68–81. arXiv:0805.0394. doi:10.1002/jgt.20406. MR 2590325. S2CID 7177893.
- belcastro, sarah-marie (2009). "Every topological surface can be knit: a proof". Journal of Mathematics and the Arts. 3 (2): 67–83. doi:10.1080/17513470902896561. MR 2553752. S2CID 120714012.
- belcastro, sarah-marie; Kaminski, Jackie (2007). "Families of dot-product snarks on orientable surfaces of low genus". Graphs and Combinatorics. 23 (3): 229–240. doi:10.1007/s00373-007-0729-9. MR 2320577. S2CID 31347628.
- belcastro, sarah-marie; Hull, Thomas C. (2002). "Modelling the folding of paper into three dimensions using affine transformations". Linear Algebra and Its Applications. 348 (1–3): 273–282. doi:10.1016/S0024-3795(01)00608-5. MR 1902132.
