= Mathemalchemy =

Installation celebrating art and mathematics

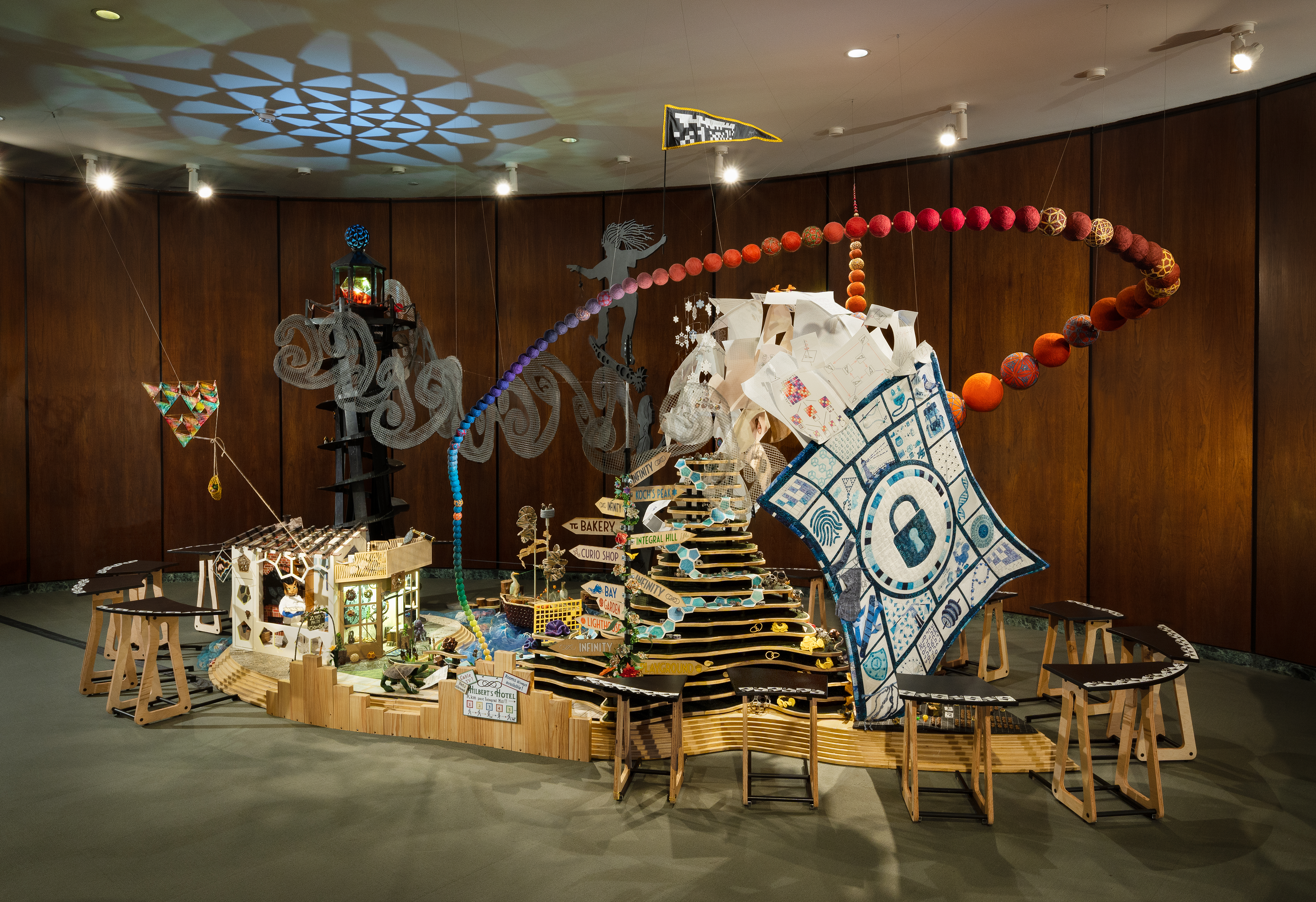
- Mathemalchemy on view at the National Academy of Sciences, 2022
- Founded: 2020
- Founder: Ingrid Daubechies; Dominique Ehrmann
- Purpose: Build a large multimedia art installation that celebrates the creativity and beauty of mathematics.
- Members: 24
- Key people: Emily Baker; Dorothy Buck; Bronna Butler; Ingrid Daubechies; Dominique Ehrmann; Rochy Flint; Faye Goldman; Susan Goldstine; Edmund Harriss; Li-Mei Lim; Elisabetta Matsumoto; Vernelle A. A. Noel; Elizabeth Paley; Samantha Pezzimenti; Kathy Peterson; Tasha Pruitt; Kimberly Roth; Henry Segerman; Jessica K. Sklar; Daina Taimina; Edward Vogel; Jake Wildstrom; Mary Williams; Carolyn Yackel
- Website: https://mathemalchemy.org/

Mathemalchemy (French: MathémAlchimie) is a traveling art installation dedicated to a celebration of the intersection of art and mathematics. It is a collaborative work led by Duke University mathematician Ingrid Daubechies and fiber artist Dominique Ehrmann. The cross-disciplinary team of 24 people, who collectively built the installation during the calendar years 2020 and 2021, includes artists, mathematicians, and craftspeople who employed a wide variety of materials to illustrate, amuse, and educate the public on the wonders, mystery, and beauty of mathematics. Including the core team of 24, about 70 people contributed in some way to the realization of Mathemalchemy.

== Description ==
The art installation occupies a footprint approximately 20 by 10.5 feet (6.1 by 3.2 m), which extends up to 9.5 feet (2.9 m) in height (in addition, small custom-fabricated tables are arranged around the periphery to protect the more fragile elements). A map shows the 14 or so different zones or regions within the exhibit, which is filled with hundreds of detailed mathematical artifacts, some smaller than 0.5 inches (13 mm); the entire exhibit comprises more than 1,000 parts which must be packed for shipment. Versions of some of the complex mathematical objects can be purchased through an associated "Mathemalchemy Boutique" website.

The art installation contains puns (such as "Pi" in a bakery) and Easter eggs, such as a miniature model of the Antikythera mechanism hidden on the bottom of "Knotilus Bay". Mathematically sophisticated visitors may enjoy puzzling out and decoding the many mathematical allusions symbolized in the exhibit, while viewers of all levels are invited to enjoy the self-guided tours, detailed explanations, and videos available on the accompanying official website.

A downloadable comic book was created to explore some of the themes of the exhibition, using an independent narrative set in the world of Mathemalchemy.

== History ==
Daubechies and Ehrmann presented the project in a special session at the 2020 Joint Mathematics Meetings (JMM) in Denver, Colorado. They soon had a core group of more than a dozen interested mathematicians and artists who in turn suggested other people not at JMM. Eventually the group would grow to 24 people.

Originally, the intent was to collectively design and fabricate in a series of workshops to be held at Duke University in Durham, North Carolina, starting in March 2020. The COVID-19 pandemic disrupted these plans. Working instead over Zoom, under the guidance of Dominique Ehrmann and various "team leaders" for different parts of the installation, the 16-by-12-by-10-foot (4.9 by 3.7 by 3.0 m) installation was collectively designed and discussed.

In July 2021 the team could finally get together at Duke for the first in-person meeting, where the components that had been fabricated in various locations in the US and Canada were assembled for the first time, leading to the first complete full-scale construction. The 24 members of the team employed ceramics, knitting, crocheting, quilting, beadwork, 3D printing, welding, woodworking, textile embellishment, origami, metal-folding, water-sculpted brick, and temari balls to create the room-sized installation.

== Themes ==
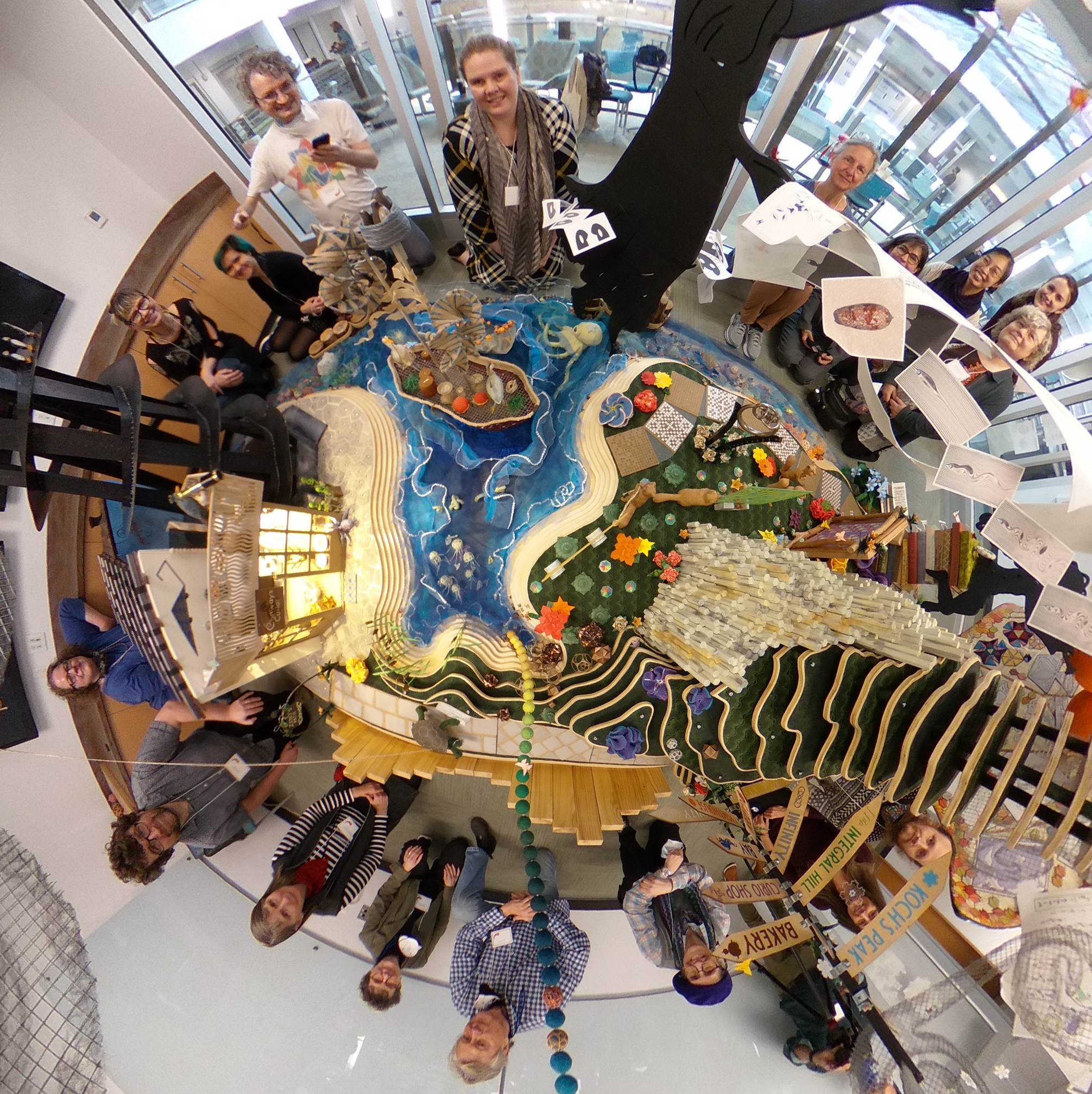
Spherical photograph of Mathemalchemy team members arrayed around the exhibit in development

The installation features or illustrates mathematical concepts at many different levels. All of the participants regard "recreational mathematics"—especially when it has a strong visual component—as having an important role in education and in culture in general. Jessica Sklar maintains that "mathematics is, at heart, a human endeavor" and feels compelled to make it accessible to those who don't regard themselves as "math people". Bronna Butler talks about the heritage of JH Conway, whose lectures were "almost magical in quality" because they used what looked like curios and tricks but in the end arrived at answers to "fundamental questions of mathematics".

Henry Segerman, who wrote the book Visualizing Mathematics With 3D Printing, contributed 3D pieces that explore stereographic projection and polyhedra. According to Susan Goldstine, "The interplay between mathematics and fiber arts is endlessly fascinating [and] allows for a deeper understanding ways that these crafts can illuminate complex concepts in mathematics". Edmund Harriss says, "You don’t need a background in math to appreciate the installation, just like you can enjoy a concert without being a musician".

The creators had the goal of illustrating as much of mathematics as possible. Thus the various exhibits touch on number theory, fractals, tessellations, probability theory, Zeno's paradoxes, Venn diagrams, knot theory, calculus, chaos theory, topology, hyperbolic geometry, symbolic logic—and much else—all in a setting that is beautiful and fun. Mathematicians explicitly mentioned or alluded to include Vladimir Arnold, John H. Conway, Felix Klein, Sofya Kovalevskaya, Henri Lebesgue, Ada Lovelace, Benoit Mandelbrot, Maryam Mirzakhani, August Möbius, Emmy Noether, Marjorie Rice, Bernhard Riemann, Caroline Series, Wacław Sierpiński, Alicia Boole Stott, William Thurston, Helge von Koch, Gladys West, Zeno, and many others.

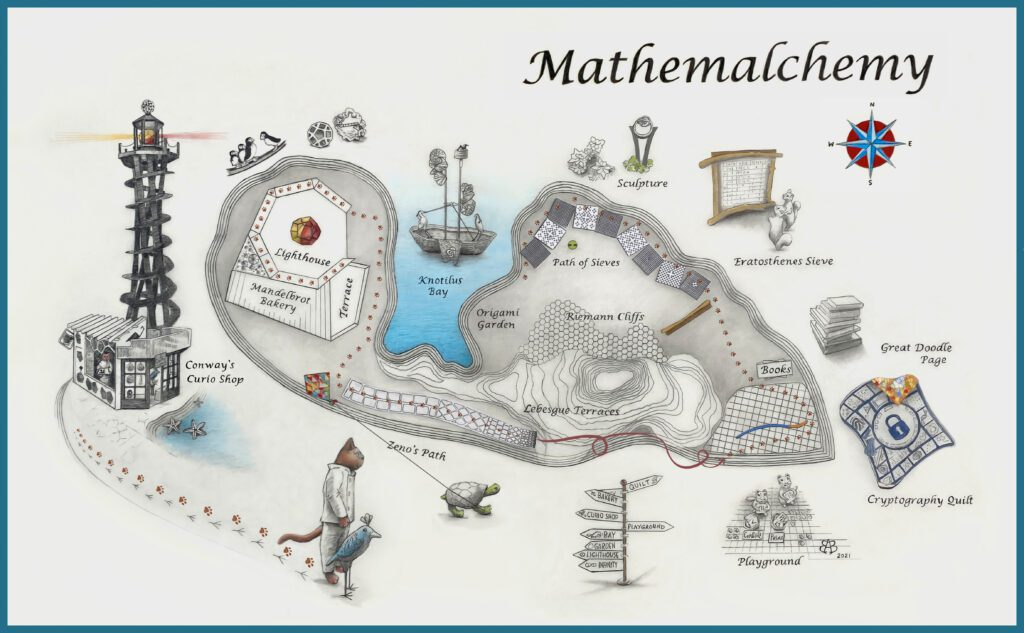
Map of Mathemalchemy exhibit

Twenty of the "mathemalchemists" are women, and the facility especially celebrates the contributions of women in mathematics, from amateur Marjorie Rice, who found new kinds of pentagon tilings, to Maryam Mirzakhani, the first woman to ever garner a Fields Medal.

== Venues ==
The finished installation was originally displayed at Duke University, then moving to the National Academy of Sciences (NAS) building in Washington DC, where it was on display from December 4, 2021, until June 12, 2022. The installation next showed at Juniata College in Huntingdon, Pennsylvania before moving to Boston University from January to March 2023, partially overlapping with the 2023 Joint Mathematics Meetings in Boston. The exhibit then moved to Beaty Biodiversity Museum in Vancouver, British Columbia and then in November of that year it went to Northern Kentucky University where it remained until February 2024. From May 22 to October 27, 2024 Mathemalchemy was at the National Museum of Mathematics (MoMath) in New York City. From November 6, 2024 to May 2, 2025, the University of Quebec in Montreal (UQAM) hosted the exhibition. After successful fundraising, the exhibition is scheduled for the Navajo Nation Museum in Window Rock, Arizona from June 18, 2025 through October 31, 2025.

The exhibit is planned to ultimately reside in the Duke University mathematics building, on permanent display.

== Gallery ==
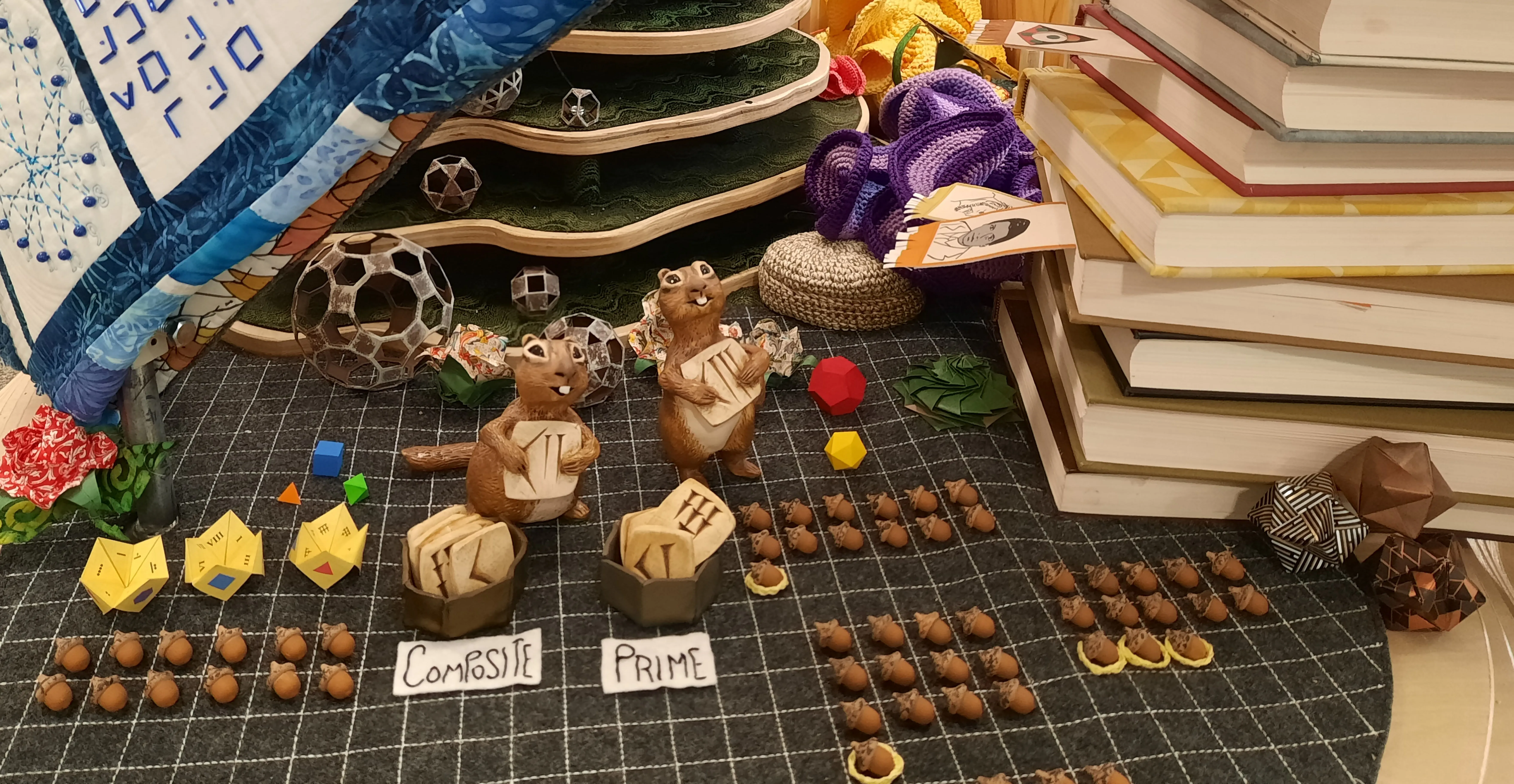
Chipmunks learn about prime and composite numbers through a game involving acorns and Babylonian numeral tiles

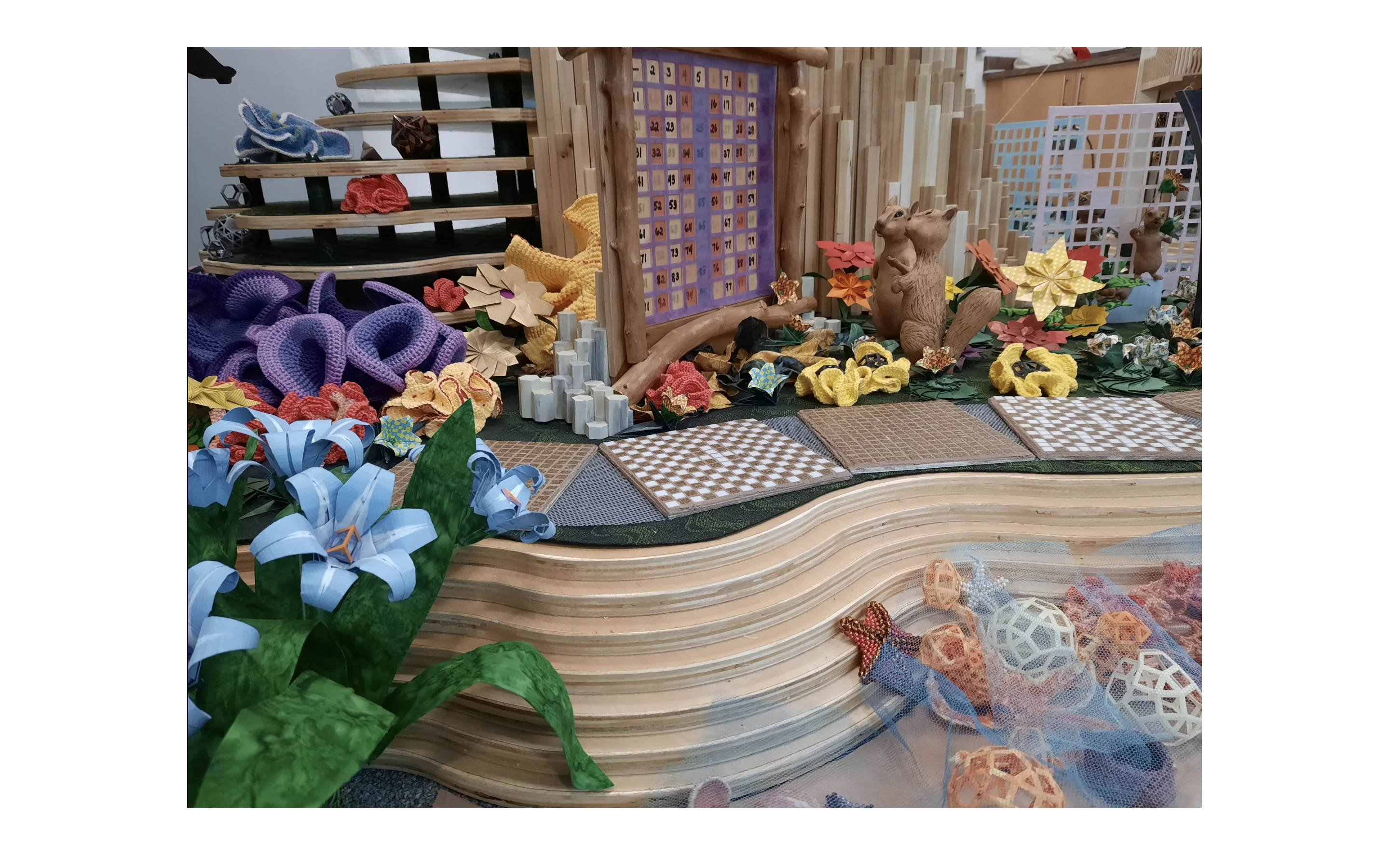
Mathematically-inspired flora and fauna fill the garden and reef as two squirrels discuss prime number algorithms in front of their Sieve of Eratosthenes

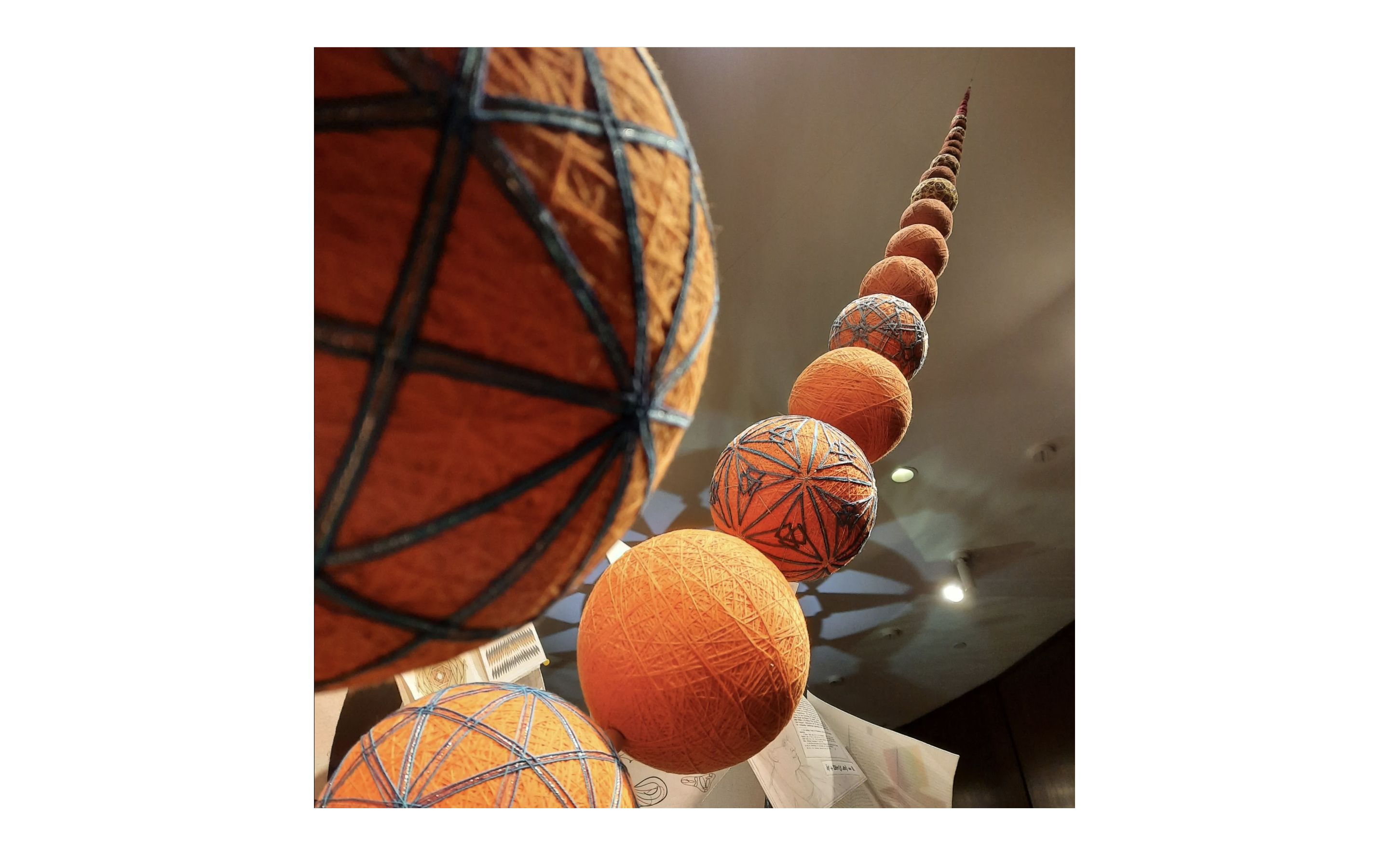
A convergent series of mari (unembroidered) and temari (embroidered) balls rises above the installation

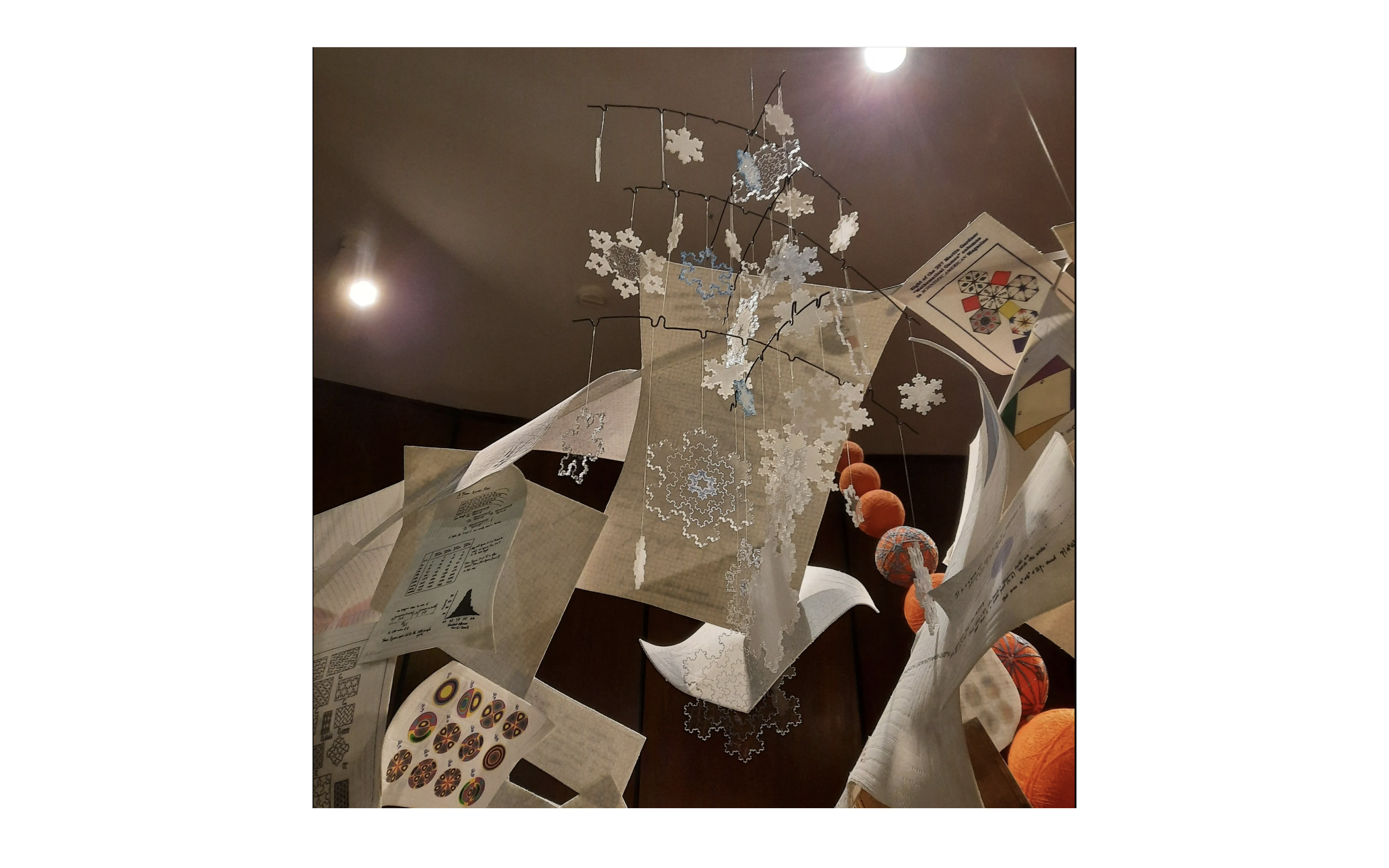
Koch snowflakes descend through the Cavalcade of mathematical pages onto Integral Hill in the exhibit

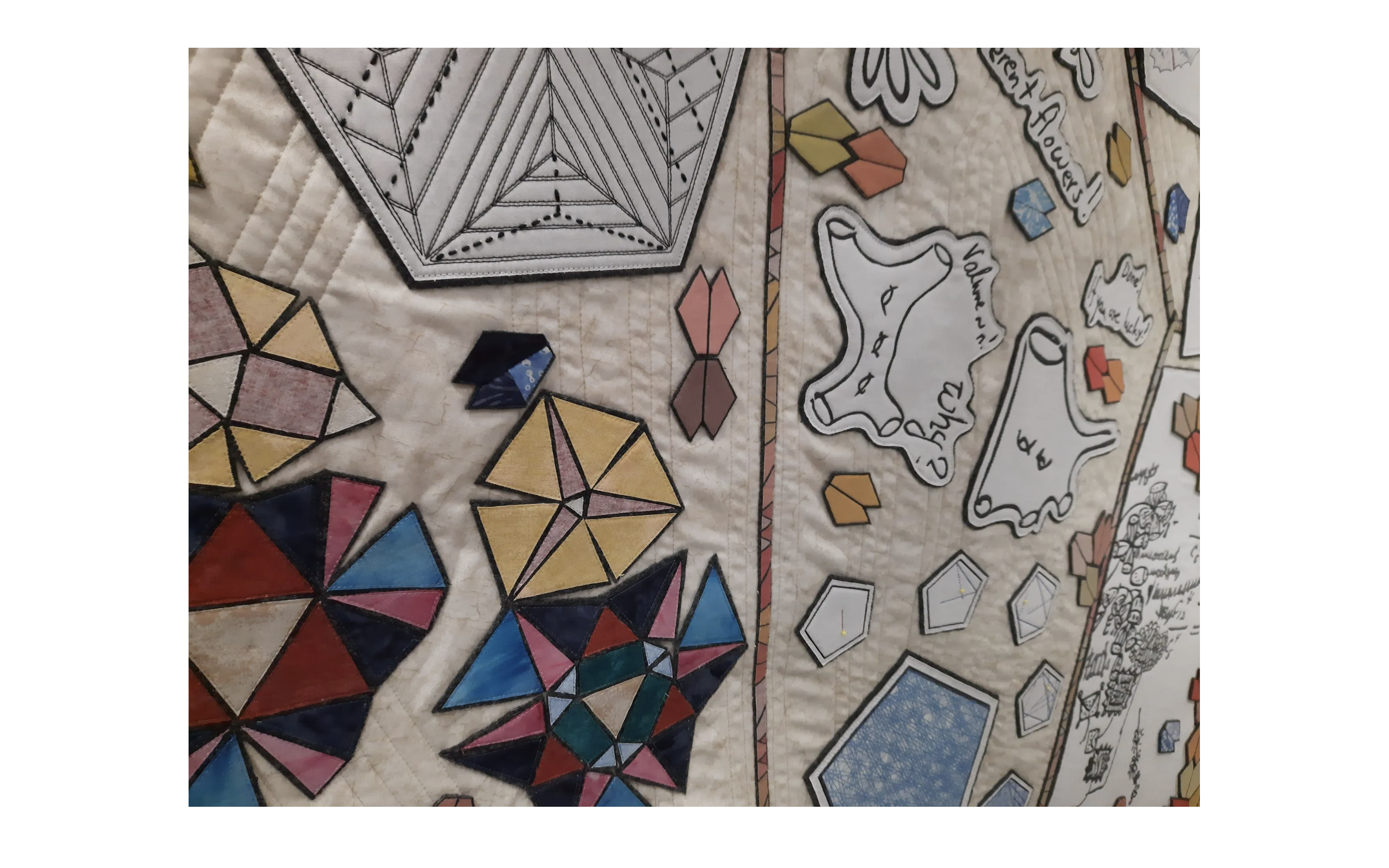
Great Doodle Page celebrates jottings by seven notable women in mathematics

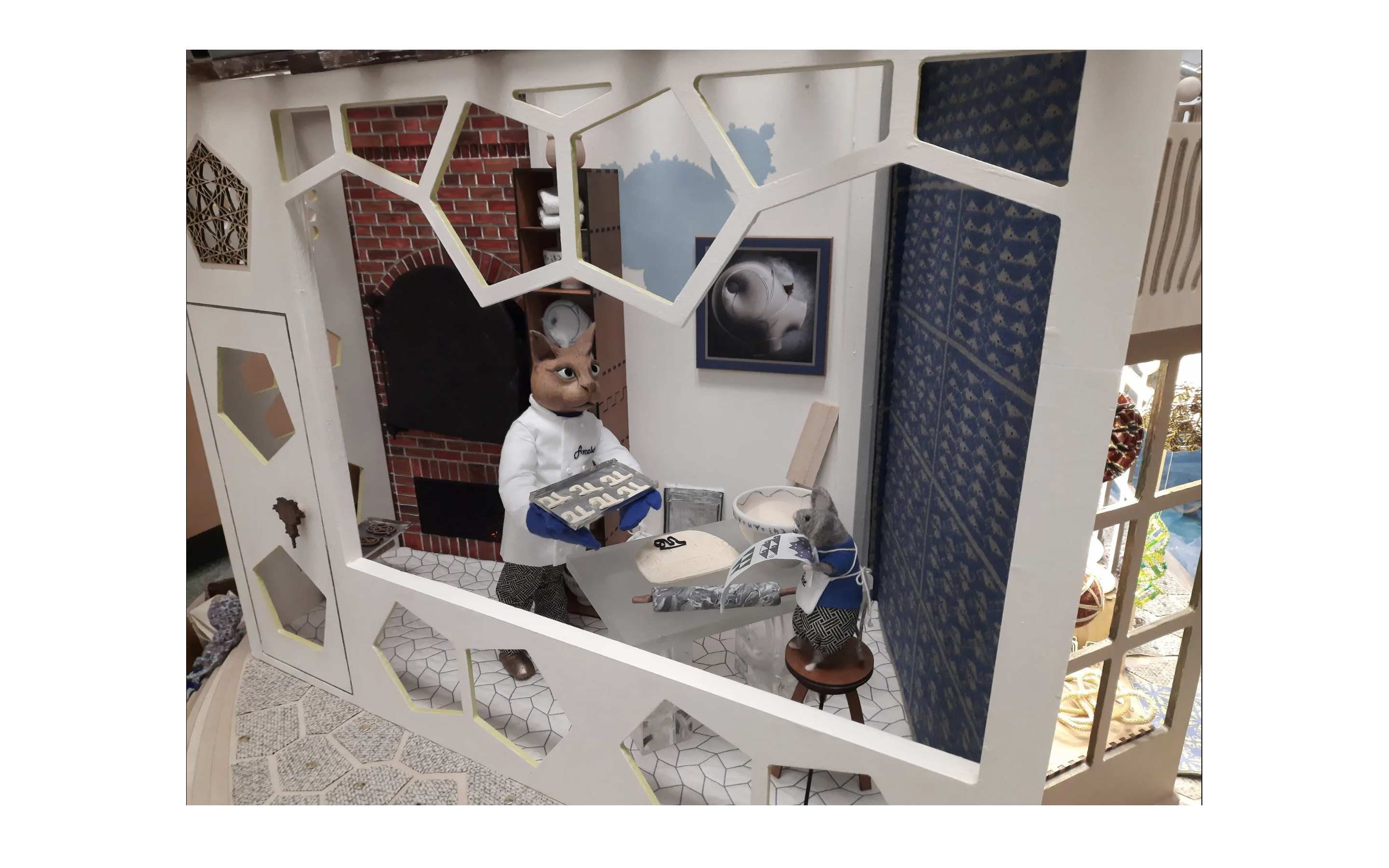
What does math taste like? Cat and mouse prepare treats in the math-infused Mandelbrot Bakery

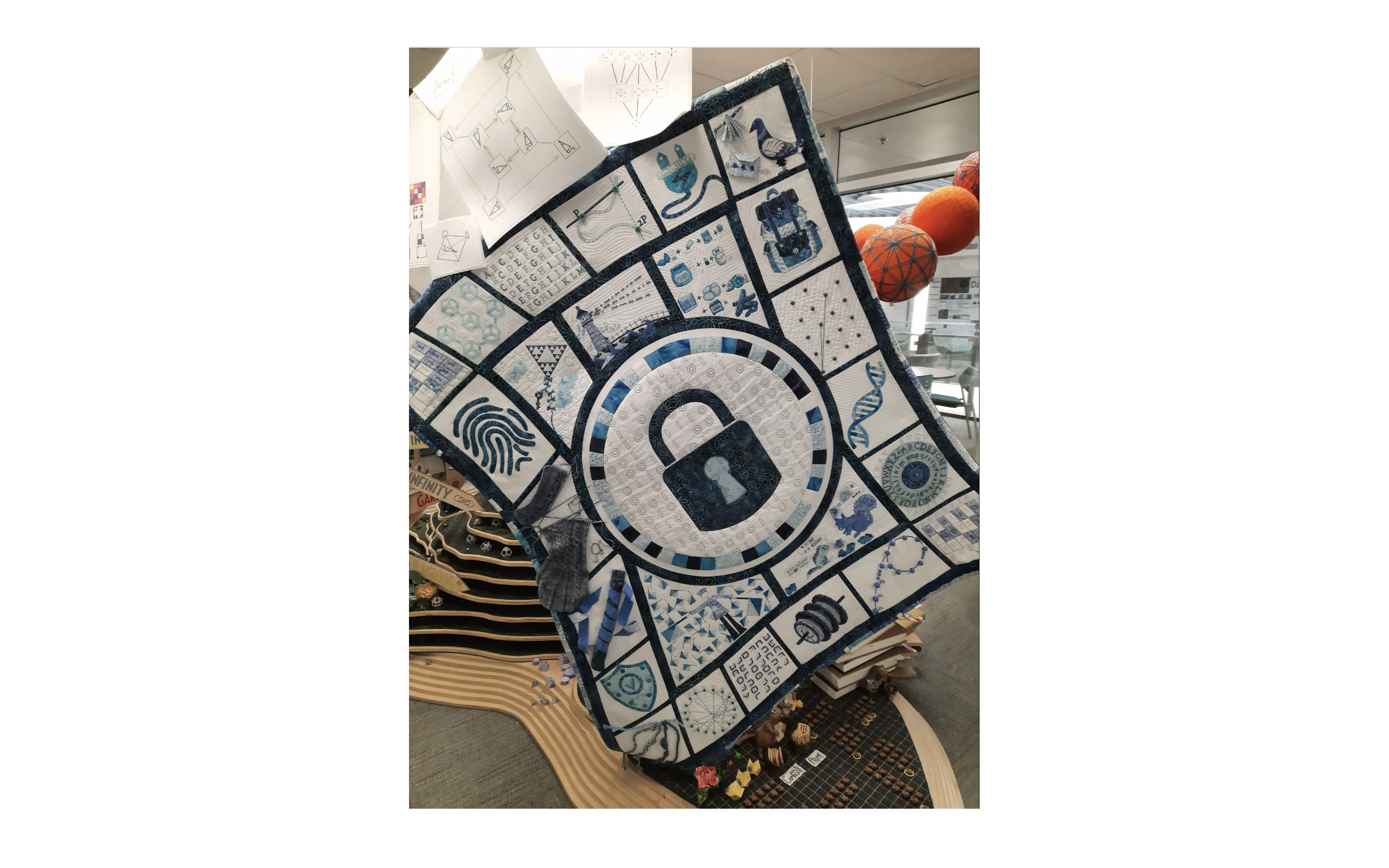
Cryptography Quilt represents 27 ways to encode messages

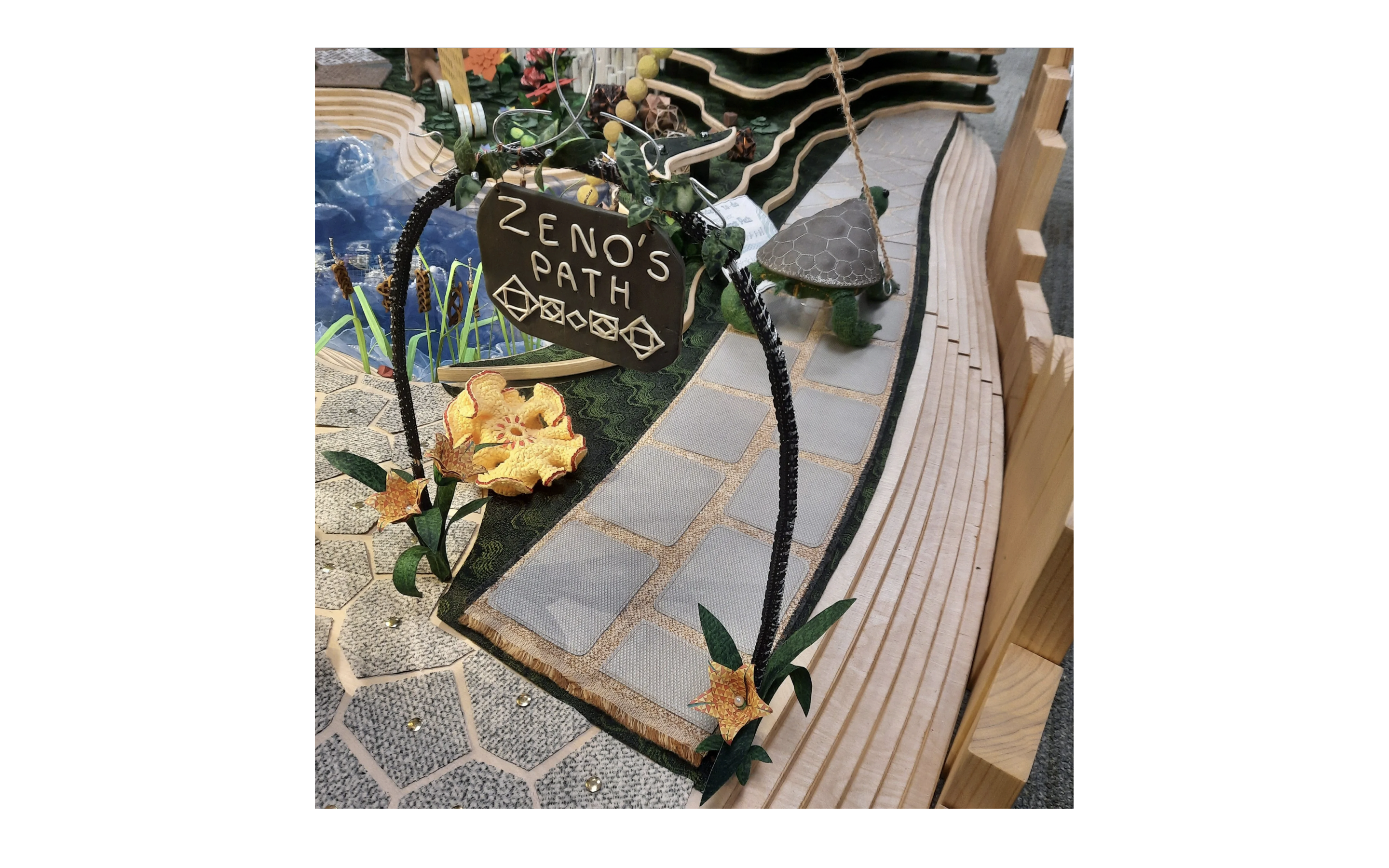
Tess the Tortoise ambles down Zeno's Path toward Integral Hill

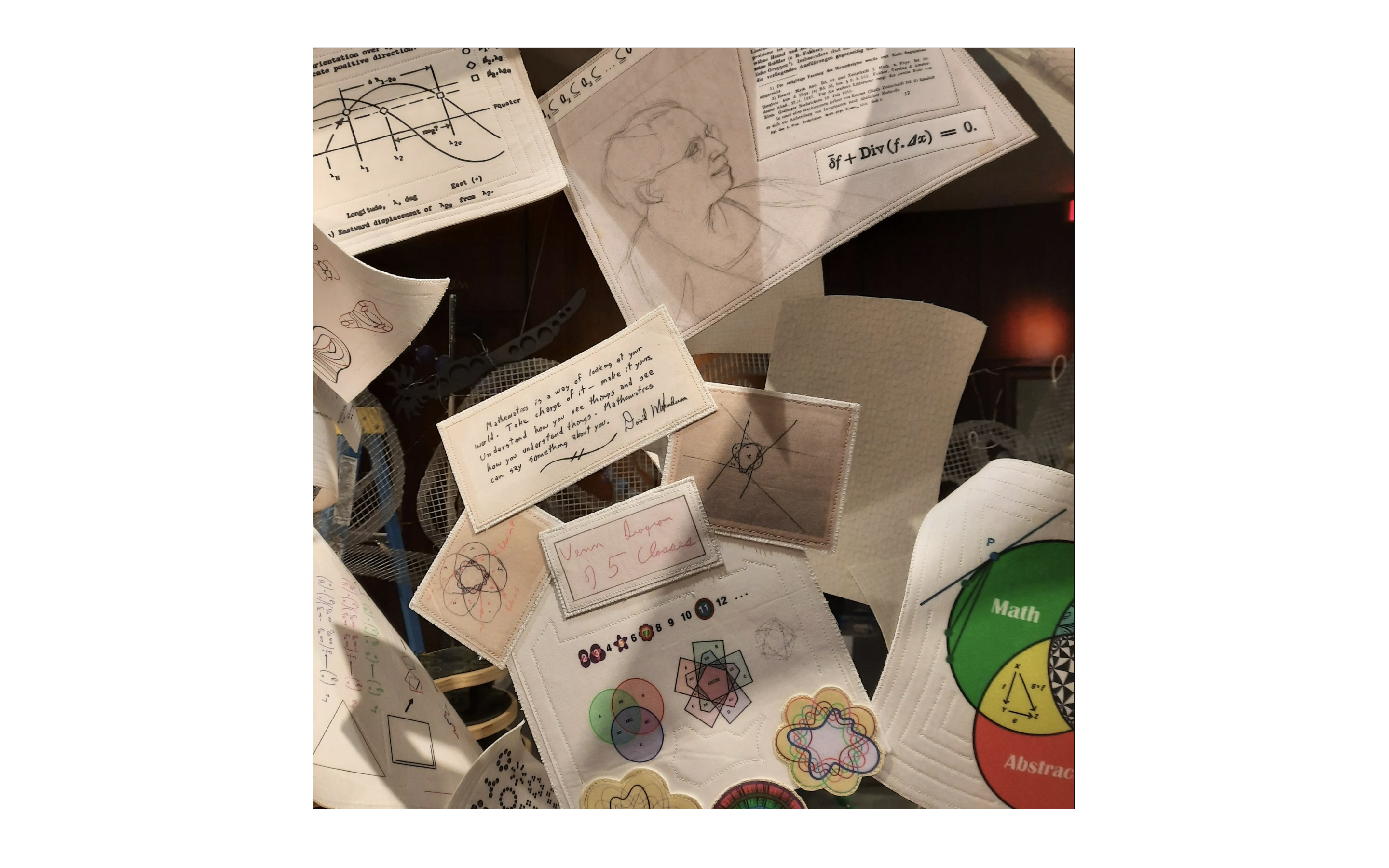
Detail from Cavalcade of mathematical pages

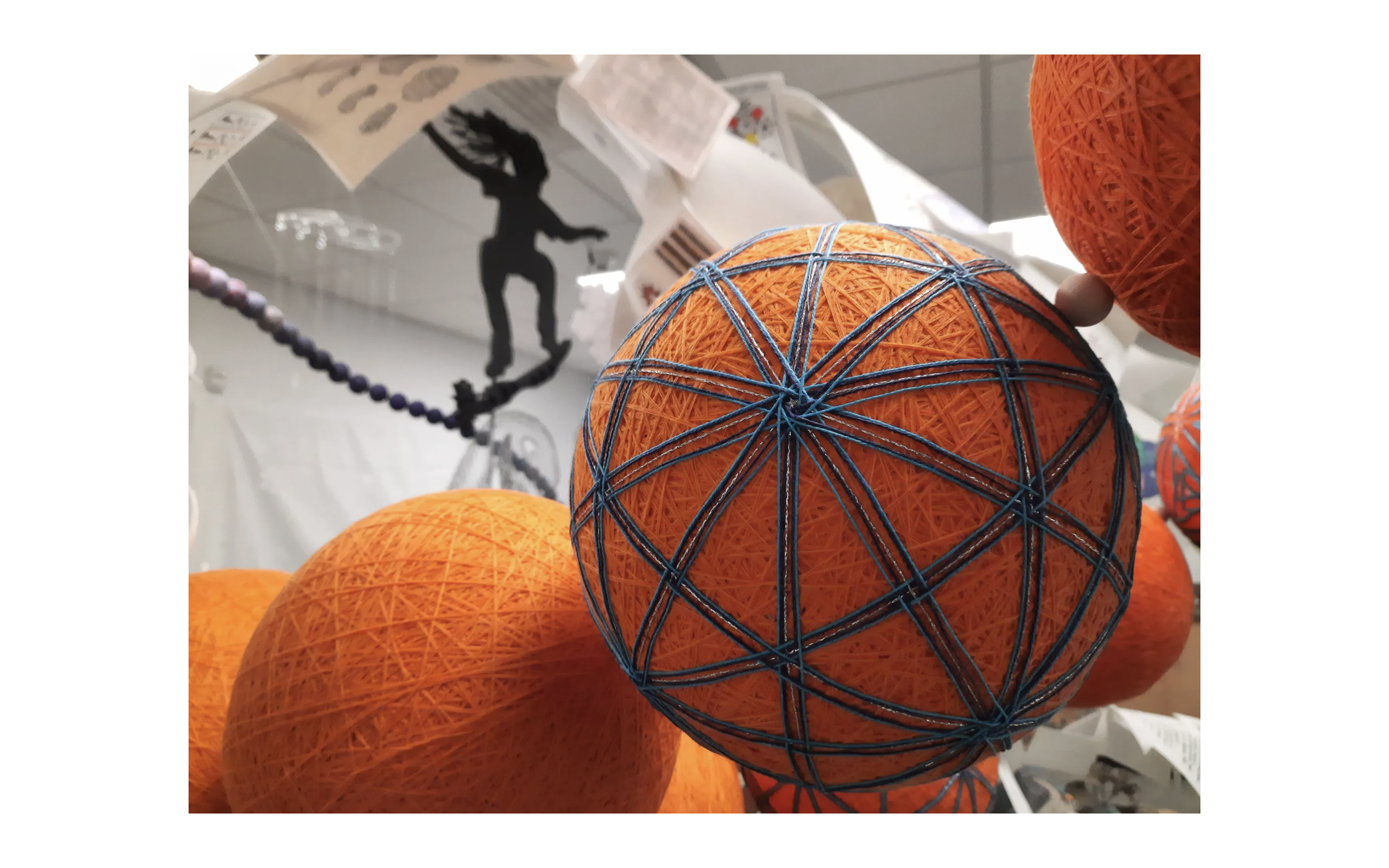
The silhouette of a teenager surfs above the Cavalcade and Ball Arches

== See also ==
- Mathematica: A World of Numbers... and Beyond – 1961 iconic mathematics exhibition by Ray and Charles Eames
- Mathematics and art
