= Henry Segerman =

British-American mathematician (born 1979)

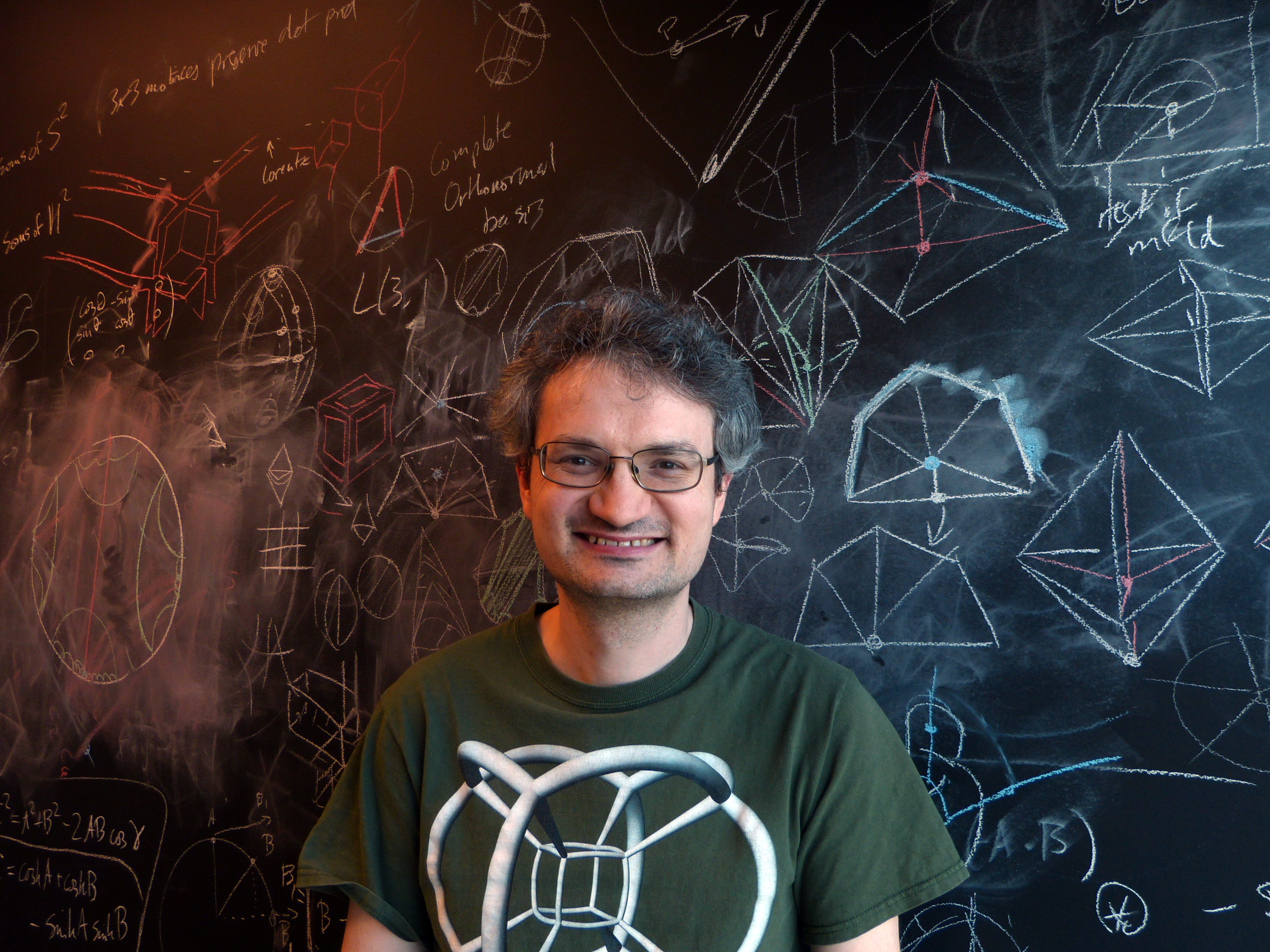
Henry Segerman at the Institute for Computational and Experimental Research in Mathematics in 2019 Photo by Sabetta Matsumoto

Henry Segerman (born 1979 in Manchester, UK) is a Professor of mathematics at Oklahoma State University in Stillwater, Oklahoma who does research in three-dimensional geometry and topology, especially three-manifolds, triangulations and hyperbolic geometry.

He was the first person to publish a book on mathematical 3D printing, and is also a recreational mathematician and mathematical artist with expertise in virtual reality. His frequent collaborators include Vi Hart, Elisabetta Matsumoto and Saul Schleimer.

== Education and career ==
Segerman received his Master of Mathematics (MS) at the University of Oxford (2001) and then his PhD at Stanford University (2007) for the dissertation "Incompressible Surfaces in Hyperbolic Punctured Torus Bundles are Strongly Detected" under Steven Paul Kerckhoff.

He was a Lecturer at the University of Texas at Austin (2007–2010) and was a Research Fellow at University of Melbourne (2010–2013). He became an Assistant Professor at Oklahoma State University (2013–2018), then an Associate Professor (2018-2025), and then a full Professor from July 2025 to the present.

Segerman's research lends itself to mathematics with a strong visual component. This led directly to his involvement with 3D printing. In 2016 he wrote the book Visualizing Mathematics With 3D Printing. Laura Taalman in a review said, "Segerman's book is an inside tour of mathematics with breathtaking 3D-printed scenery."

== 3D printing ==
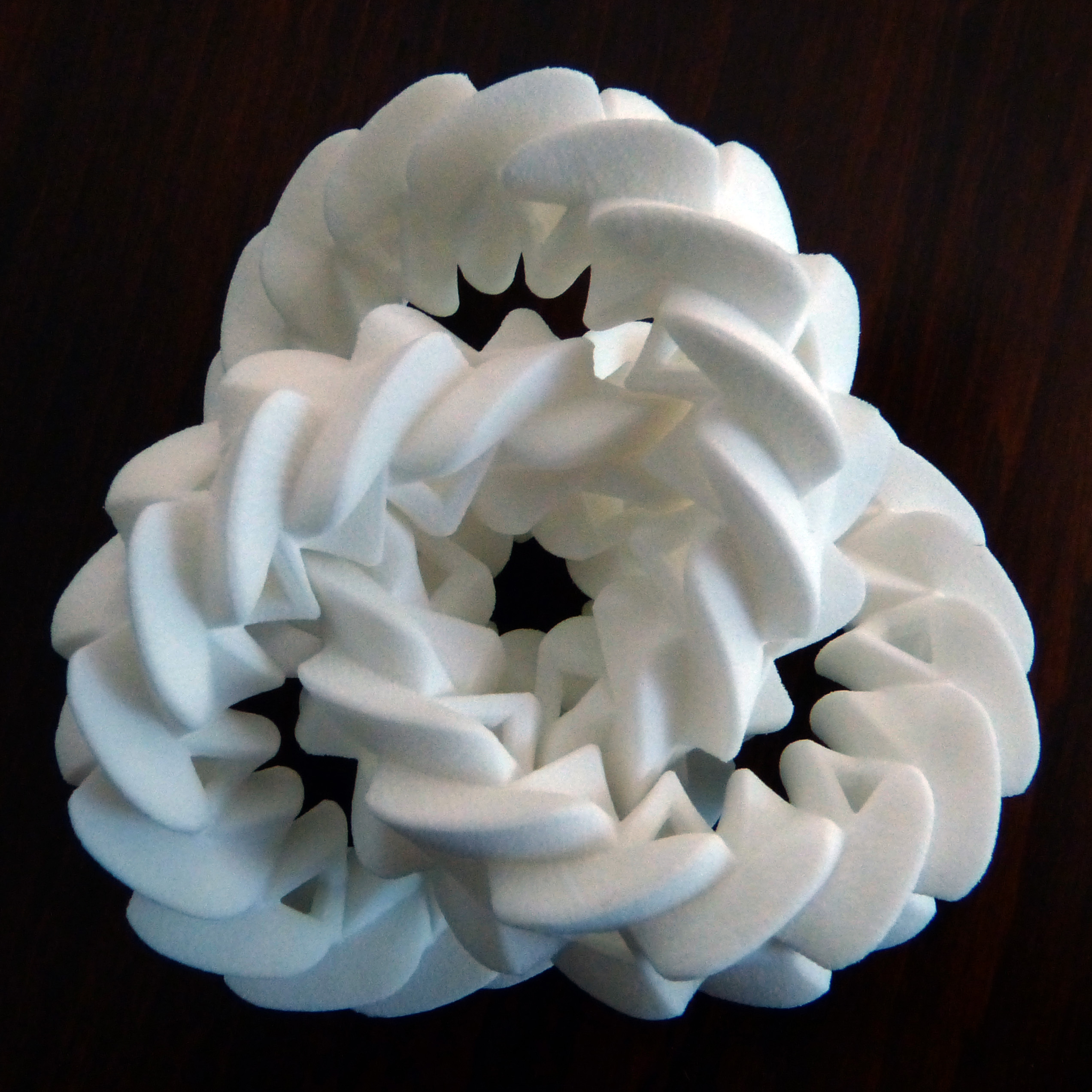
Triple gear by Saul Schleimer and Henry Segerman

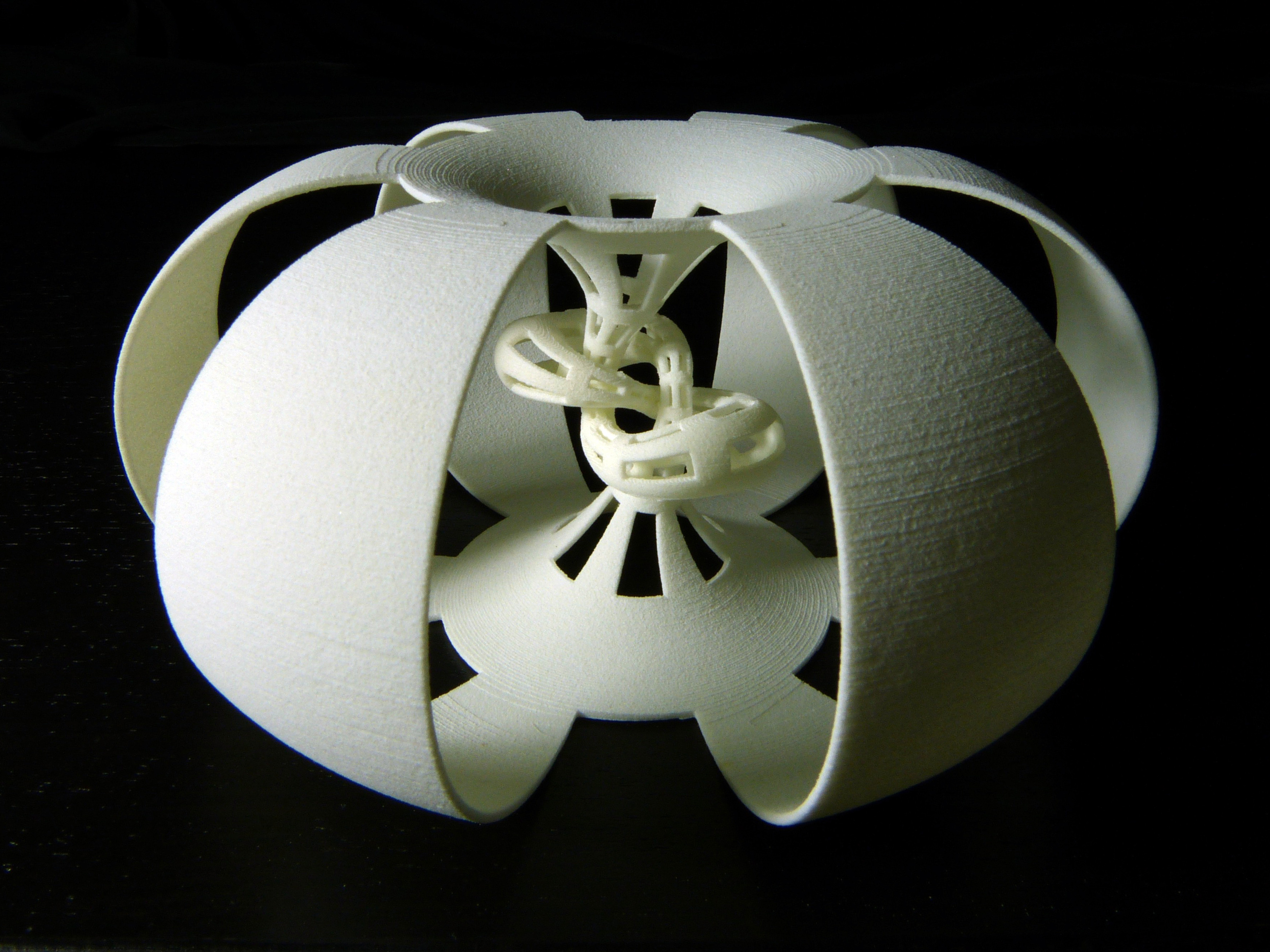
Figure eight knot complement by François Guéritaud, Saul Schleimer, and Henry Segerman

Mathematicians used to rely on wooden or plaster models to visualize complex geometrical shapes. Nowadays, if they can be described mathematically, we can "print" them with 3D printers. Segerman uses mathematical tools including quaternions, Euclidean and non-Euclidean geometries and stereographic projection to create instructions for 3D printers. Sometimes the goal is to produce a work of art. Sometimes it is to shed light on four-dimensional geometry or some other field such as mathematical group theory. Sometimes it is both. One of his sculptures depicts a set of monkeys joined together to form a 4-dimensional hypercube.

Segerman's techniques help us visualize a four dimensional world. Just as the frame of a cube can cast a shadow on a flat wall, Segerman makes analogous shadows of four dimensional objects via a 3D printer. Segerman has also explored kinetic artwork, designing mechanisms that move in unusual or seemingly paradoxical ways.

== Recreational mathematics ==
Segerman has appeared as a recreational mathematician at Gathering 4 Gardner conferences and is a frequent contributor to Numberphile.

Combining his interests in mathematics and art he is one of 24 mathematicians and artists who make up the Mathemalchemy Team.

In another foray into recreational mathematics Segerman founded Dice Lab with mathematical artist Robert Fathauer. Using computer search and help from fellow recreational mathematician Robert Bosch, they created a "numerically balanced" 120-sided die in the shape of a disdyakis triacontahedron. It is the "biggest, most complex fair die possible". They concede that the die is "expensive and there’s no real use for it", but it's still theoretically interesting.

== Selected papers ==
Segerman does research in three-dimensional geometry and topology. Papers published in this area include:

- 2020 "Ray-marching Thurston geometries", arXiv:2010.15801 [math.GT, cs.GR, math.DS], [with Coulon, Matsumoto and Trettel], October 2020
- 2010 "Veering triangulations admit strict angle structures" [with Hodgson, Rubinstein and Tillmann] Geometry & Topology, November 2010, 15(4)
- 2015 "1-efficient triangulations and the index of a cusped hyperbolic 3-manifold", [with Garoufalidis, Hodgson and Rubinstein], Geometry & Topology 19 (2015), pp. 2619–2689

A second major interest, with some overlap, is mathematical visualization & art. Papers published in this area include:

- 2014 "The Quaternion Group as a Symmetry Group", [with Vi Hart], Proceedings of Bridges 2014: Mathematics, pp. 143–150
- 2012 "3D printing for mathematical visualisation", Math. Intell. 34(4) December 2012, pp. 56–62

== Awards ==
- The paper "The Quaternion Group as a Symmetry Group" (with Vi Hart) was republished in The Best Writing on Mathematics 2015.
- The video "Non-Euclidean Virtual Reality Using Ray-Marching was a winner in the 2019 We Are Mathematics Video Competition.
