= Jessica Sklar =

American mathematician

Jessica Katherine Sklar (born 1973) is a mathematician interested in abstract algebra, recreational mathematics, mathematics and art, and mathematics and popular culture. She is a professor of mathematics at Pacific Lutheran University, and former head of the mathematics department at Pacific Lutheran.

== Education and career ==
As a high school student, Sklar studied poetry at the Interlochen Arts Academy. She did her undergraduate studies at Swarthmore College, where her mother Elizabeth S. Sklar had earned a degree in English (later becoming an English professor at Wayne State University) and her father Lawrence Sklar had taught philosophy. Jessica completed a double major in English and mathematics in 1995.

Next, Sklar moved to the University of Oregon for graduate study in mathematics, earning a master's degree in 1997 and completing her Ph.D. there in 2001. Her dissertation, Binomial Rings and Algebras, was supervised by Frank Wylie Anderson.

She has been a faculty member in the mathematics department at Pacific Lutheran since 2001.

Combining her interests in mathematics and art she is one of 24 mathematicians and artists who make up the Mathemalchemy Team.

== Selected publications ==
- “‘Bok bok’: exploring the game of Chicken in film,” with Jennifer F. Nordstrom. In: Handbook of the Mathematics of the Arts and Sciences. Ed. Bharath Sriraman. Springer International Publishing, Cham, 2020.
- “‘Elegance in design’: mathematics and the works of Ted Chiang.” In: Handbook of the Mathematics of the Arts and Sciences. Ed. Bharath Sriraman. Springer International Publishing, Cham, 2020.
- “Disciple” (poem). Journal of Humanistic Mathematics 7(2) (July 2017), 418.
- First-Semester Abstract Algebra: A Structural Approach. GNU Free Documentation License, 2017.
- “A confused electrician uses Smith normal form,” with Tom Edgar. Mathematics Magazine 89(1) (2016), 3–13.
- Mathematics in Popular Culture: Essays on Appearances in Film, Literature, Games, Television and Other Media. Jefferson, NC: McFarland & Co., 2012. Editor, with Elizabeth S. Sklar.
- “The graph menagerie: abstract algebra and the Mad Veterinarian,” with G. Abrams. Mathematics Magazine 83(3) (2010), 168–179.
- “Dials and levers and glyphs, oh my! Linear algebra solutions to computer game puzzles.”Mathematics Magazine 79(5) (2006), 360–367.
- "Binomial rings.” Communications in Algebra 32(4) (2004), 1385–1399.
- “Binomial algebras.” Communications in Algebra 30(4) (2002), 1961–1978.

== Recognition ==
Sklar was a winner of the Carl B. Allendoerfer Award of the Mathematical Association of America in 2011 for her paper with Gene Abrams, The Graph Menagerie: Abstract Algebra and the Mad Veterinarian. The paper provides a general solution to a class of lattice reduction puzzles exemplified by the following one:

"Suppose a mad veterinarian creates a transmogrifier that can convert one cat into two dogs and five mice, or one dog into three cats and three mice, or a mouse into a cat and a dog. It can also do each of these operations in reverse. Can it, through any sequence of operations, convert two cats into a pack of dogs? How about one cat?"

She was the July 2012 Author of the Month at Ada's Technical Books in Seattle, Washgington.
