= Edmund Harriss =

British mathematician, artist and author

Edmund Orme Harriss (born 1976 in Worcester, UK) is a British mathematician, writer and artist. Since 2010 he has been at the Fulbright College of Arts & Sciences at The University of Arkansas in Fayetteville, Arkansas where he is an Assistant Professor of Arts & Sciences (ARSC) and Mathematical Sciences (MASC). He does research in the Geometry of Tilings and Patterns, a branch of Convex and Discrete Geometry. He is the discoverer of the spiral that bears his name.

== Education and career ==
Harriss earned a Master of Mathematics at the University of Warwick (2000) and then obtained his PhD at Imperial College London (2003) with the dissertation "On Canonical Substitution Tilings" under Jeroen Lamb.

Harriss has been a speaker at FSCONS, a Nordic Free software conference.

Harriss is active on Numberphile where he has given talks on Heesch numbers, Tribonacci numbers, the Rauzy fractal and the plastic ratio.

In May and June 2020 Harriss was a visiting fellow at The Institute for Advanced Study of Aix-Marseille University (IMéRA) where he studied the possibilities of visual and spatial models and animations to illustrate a wide variety of mathematical ideas.

== Mathematical art ==
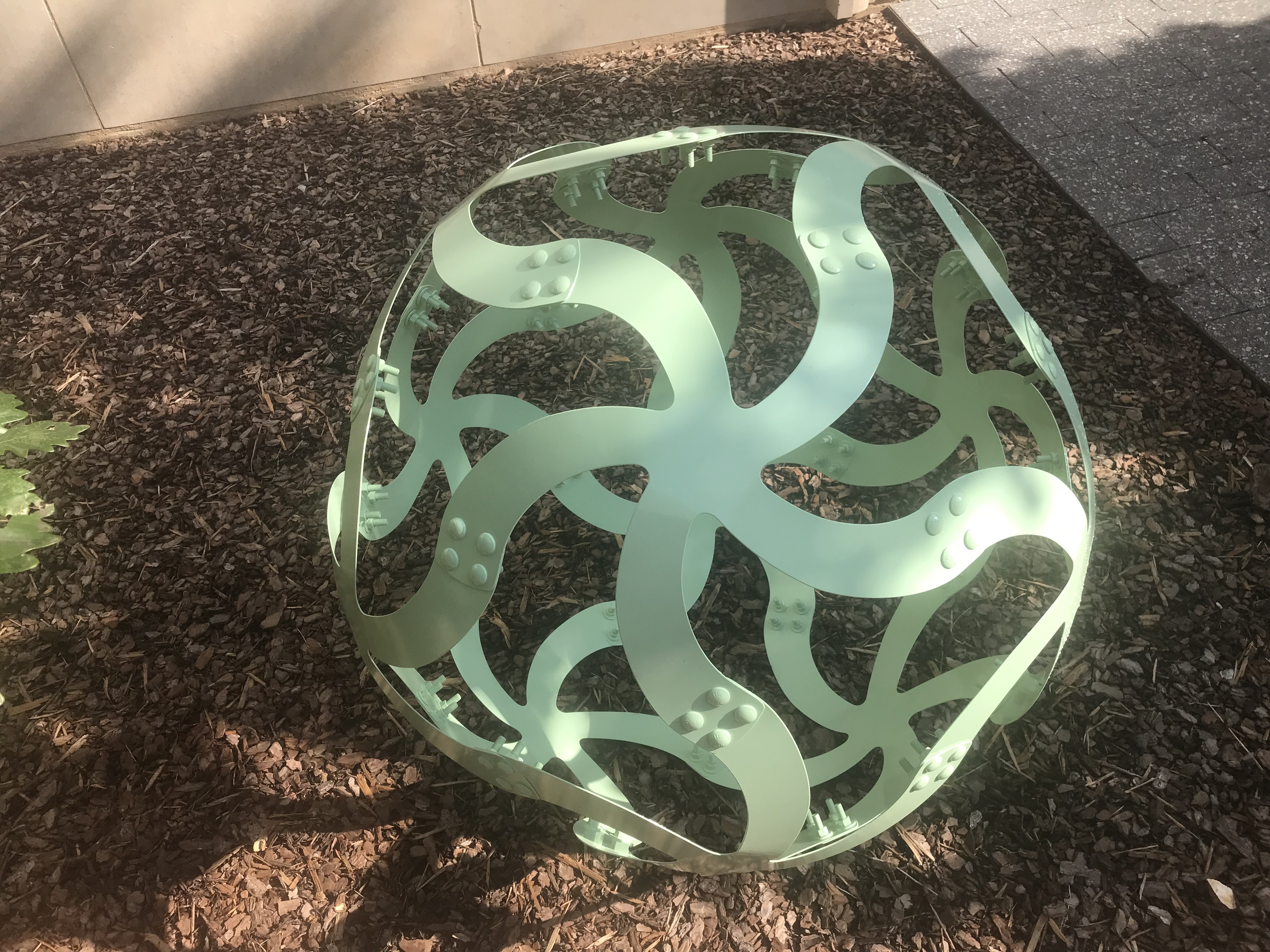
Sculpture made from flat materials using the curvahedra invented by Harris

The Gauss–Bonnet theorem gives the relationship between the curvature of a surface and the amount of turning as you traverse the surface’s boundary. Harriss used this theorem to invent shapes called Curvahedra which were then incorporated into sculpture. Scientists at MIT are investigating ways in which curvahedra may have applications in construction.

Art and mathematics are intertwined in Harris's work. He uses public art to demonstrate deep mathematical ideas and his academic work frequently involves the visualization of mathematics. Mathematically themed sculptures by Harriss have been installed at Oklahoma State University, at the University of Arkansas, and at Imperial College London.

Combining his interest in art and mathematical tilings he is one of 24 mathematicians and artists who make up the Mathemalchemy Team.

== Harriss Spiral ==
The Harriss Spiral

Harriss noticed that the golden ratio is just one example of a more general idea: In how many ways can a rectangle be divided into squares and rectangles? The golden ratio results when a rectangle is divided into a one square and one similar rectangle. But by varying the number of squares and sub-rectangles, we arrive at what Harriss calls "proportion systems". The solutions in all cases are algebraic numbers and the golden ratio is just one of them.

"The golden ratio is this incredibly well-explored corner of a whole city,” he said. “I wanted to give signposts to other locations in that city."

Harriss investigated the next simplest case, dividing a rectangle into one square and two similar rectangles. The ratio that emerged in this case is the so-called plastic ratio. The golden spiral is closely related to the first case, dissection into one square and one similar rectangle. Harriss applied the same idea to this second case and discovered a new fractal spiral related to the plastic ratio and since named after him.

== Selected publications ==
=== Books ===
Harriss has published several books designed to spread joy in mathematics. The sales of his colouring books run well beyond 100,000.

- (2015) Snowflake Seashell Star: Colouring Adventures in Numberland with Alex Bellos ISBN 1782117881
- (2016) Patterns of the Universe: A Coloring Adventure in Math and Beauty, with Alex Bellos ISBN 9781615193233
- (2016) Visions of the Universe: A Coloring Journey Through Math's Great Mysteries, with Alex Bellos ISBN 9781615193677
- (2020) Hello Numbers! What Can You Do? 'An Adventure Beyond Counting, with Houston Hughes, Illustrated by Brian Rea ISBN 9781615196845

=== Papers ===
- (2011) "From oranges to modems" in "The unplanned impact of mathematics", Nature, vol 475, pp. 166–169
- (2011) "Algebraic numbers, free group automorphisms and substitutions on the plane" with Pierre Arnoux, Maki Furukado and Shunji Ito, Transactions of the American Mathematical Society 363 (2011), pp. 4651-4699
- (2015) "Strain and the optoelectronic properties of nonplanar phosphorene monolayers" with Mehrshad Mehboudi et al, Proceedings of the National Academy of Sciences of the United States of America
- (2020) "Algebraic Number Starscapes" with Katherine E. Stange and Steve Trettel
