= Lawrence Sklar =

American philosopher (1938–2024)

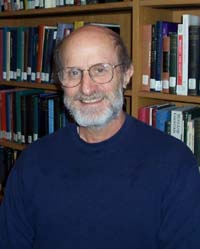
- Born: June 25, 1938; Baltimore, Maryland, U.S.
- Died: 2024 (aged 85–86)

Philosophical work
- Era: Contemporary philosophy
- Region: Western philosophy
- School: Analytic
- Institutions: University of Michigan
- Main interests: Philosophy of physics

Lawrence Sklar (June 25, 1938 – 2024) was an American philosopher. He was the Carl G. Hempel and William K. Frankena Distinguished University Professor Emeritus at the University of Michigan.

== Education and career ==
Sklar was born in Baltimore, Maryland, in 1938 and educated at Oberlin College (B.A., 1954–1958) and Princeton University (M.A., Ph.D., 1959–1964) where he worked with Hilary Putnam.

He worked at Swarthmore College from 1962 to 1966, first as an instructor and then as an assistant professor. He then worked as an assistant professor at Princeton University until 1968. After 1968, he worked at the University of Michigan, where he was a Distinguished University Professor Emeritus.

He held visiting professorships at the University of Illinois (1963), the University of Pennsylvania (1968), Harvard University (1970), UCLA (1973) and Wayne State University (1977).

== Philosophical work ==
Sklar specialized in the philosophy of physics, approaching a wide range of issues from a position best described as highly skeptical of many of the metaphysical conclusions commonly drawn in the physical sciences. He advocated the 'MIMO' (metaphysics in, metaphysics out) principle, claiming that much of the metaphysical content of interpreted theories in the special sciences arises from metaphysical assumptions made during their formulation.

== Personal life and death ==
While at Swarthmore, Sklar met and married Swarthmore undergraduate Elizabeth Sherr Sklar, who would later become an English professor at Wayne State University. Their daughter is mathematician Jessica Sklar. Sklar died in 2024.

== Awards and honors ==
- Sigma Xi
- Phi Beta Kappa, 1957
- Physics and Chance selected by Choice: Current Reviews for Academic Libraries as Outstanding Academic Book in philosophy of science for 1995
- Fellow, American Academy of Arts and Sciences
- John Locke Lectureship in Philosophy, 1998, Oxford University
- President, American Philosophical Association, Central Division, 2000–01
- President, Philosophy of Science Association, 2007–08

== Selected publications ==
- Space, Time and Spacetime (University of California Press, 1974) (awarded the Matchette Prize from the American Philosophical Association as the outstanding philosophical book for 1973–74)
- Philosophy and Spacetime Physics (University of California Press, 1985)
- Philosophy of Physics (Oxford University Press, 1992)
- Physics and Chance: Philosophical Issues in the Foundations of Statistical Mechanics (Cambridge University Press, 1993) (awarded the Lakatos Award in philosophy of science for 1995)
- Theory and Truth: Philosophical Critique Within Foundational Science (Oxford University Press, 2000) (based on the John Locke Lectures at Oxford)
- Philosophy and the Foundations of Dynamics (Cambridge University Press, 2013)
