= Erna Beth Yackel =

American college professor (1939–2022)

- Erna Beth Yackel, from a 1983 newspaper
- Born: Erna Beth Seecamp; February 13, 1939; Portland, Oregon
- Died: September 1, 2022 (aged 83); Dyer, Indiana
- Occupations: College professor, math educator
- Children: 3, including Carolyn Yackel

Erna Beth Seecamp Yackel (February 13, 1939 – September 1, 2022) was an American college professor and math educator. She was a member of the faculty at Purdue University Northwest from 1984 to 2004.

== Early life and education ==
Erna Beth was born in Portland, Oregon, the daughter of Carsten Herman Seecamp and Ida Julia Zepik Seecamp. Both of her parents were from Canada; her father was a clergyman born in Germany, and the family lived in various rural places in Canada during her childhood. She earned a bachelor's degree at Dickinson State University in 1957, at age 18, and a master's degree in mathematics at the University of Minnesota at age 21. She later completed doctoral studies in mathematics education at Purdue University in 1984. Her dissertation was titled "Characteristics of Problem Representation Indicative of Understanding in Mathematics Problem Solving".

== Career ==
Yackel taught statistics at Purdue while she was working on her doctorate, and for several years co-taught "Overcoming Math Anxiety", a noncredit class. She was a member of the faculty at Purdue University Northwest from 1984 until she retired in 2004. Early in her career, she won a Young Investigator Award from the National Science Foundation. She spoke at international conferences in her field. In 1992, she received the Golden Hawk Award from Dickinson State University. In 2005, she received a Distinguished Education Alumni Award from Purdue University.

== Publications ==
Yackel published over 100 articles and book chapters in mathematics education, often on the subject of "sociomathematical norms", a concept she helped to develop. She also co-wrote a textbook on math education. Her work was published in scholarly journals including American Educational Research Journal, Journal for Research in Mathematics Education, Educational Studies in Mathematics, Educational Psychologist, The Journal of Mathematical Behavior, The Arithmetic Teacher, and Journal of Mathematics Teacher Education.

- "Research Into Practice: Experience, Problem Solving, and Discourse as Central Aspects of Constructivism" (1990, with Paul Cobb, Terry Wood, Graceann Merkel, and Michael T. Battista)
- "Change in Teaching Mathematics: A Case Study" (1991, Terry Wood and Paul Cobb)
- "A Constructivist Alternative to the Representational View of Mind in Mathematics Education" (1992, with Paul Cobb and Terry Wood)
- "Interaction and Learning in Mathematics Classroom Situations" (1992, with Paul Cobb and Terry Wood)
- "Constructivist, emergent, and sociocultural perspectives in the context of developmental research" (1996, with Paul Cobb)
- "Sociomathematical Norms, Argumentation, and Autonomy in Mathematics" (1996, with Paul Cobb)
- "Social and sociomathematical norms in an advanced undergraduate mathematics course" (2000, with Chris Rasmussen and Karen King)
- Symbolizing and Communicating in Mathematics Classrooms: Perspectives on Discourse, Tools, and Instructional Design (2000, with Paul Cobb and Kay McClain)
- "Mathematical tasks designed to foster a reconceptualized view of early arithmetic" (2007, with Norma Salem Elias and Diana Underwood)
- "Young Children’s Emotional Acts While Engaged in Mathematical Problem Solving" (2011, with Paul Cobb and Terry Wood)
- "The Development of Collaborative Dialogue Within Small Group Interactions" (2013, with Terry Wood)
- "Justification in the Context of High School: Co-constructing Content and Process" (2022, with Jill Newton)

== Personal life ==
Erna Beth married fellow academic James Yackel in 1960, while they were both graduate students in Minneapolis. They had three children, including attorney Juliet Yackel, computer science professor Jonathan Yackel, and Carolyn Yackel, a noted mathematician.

She died at her home in Dyer, Indiana on September 1, 2022, at the age of 83.
