= Temari (toy) =

Type of Japanese folk art

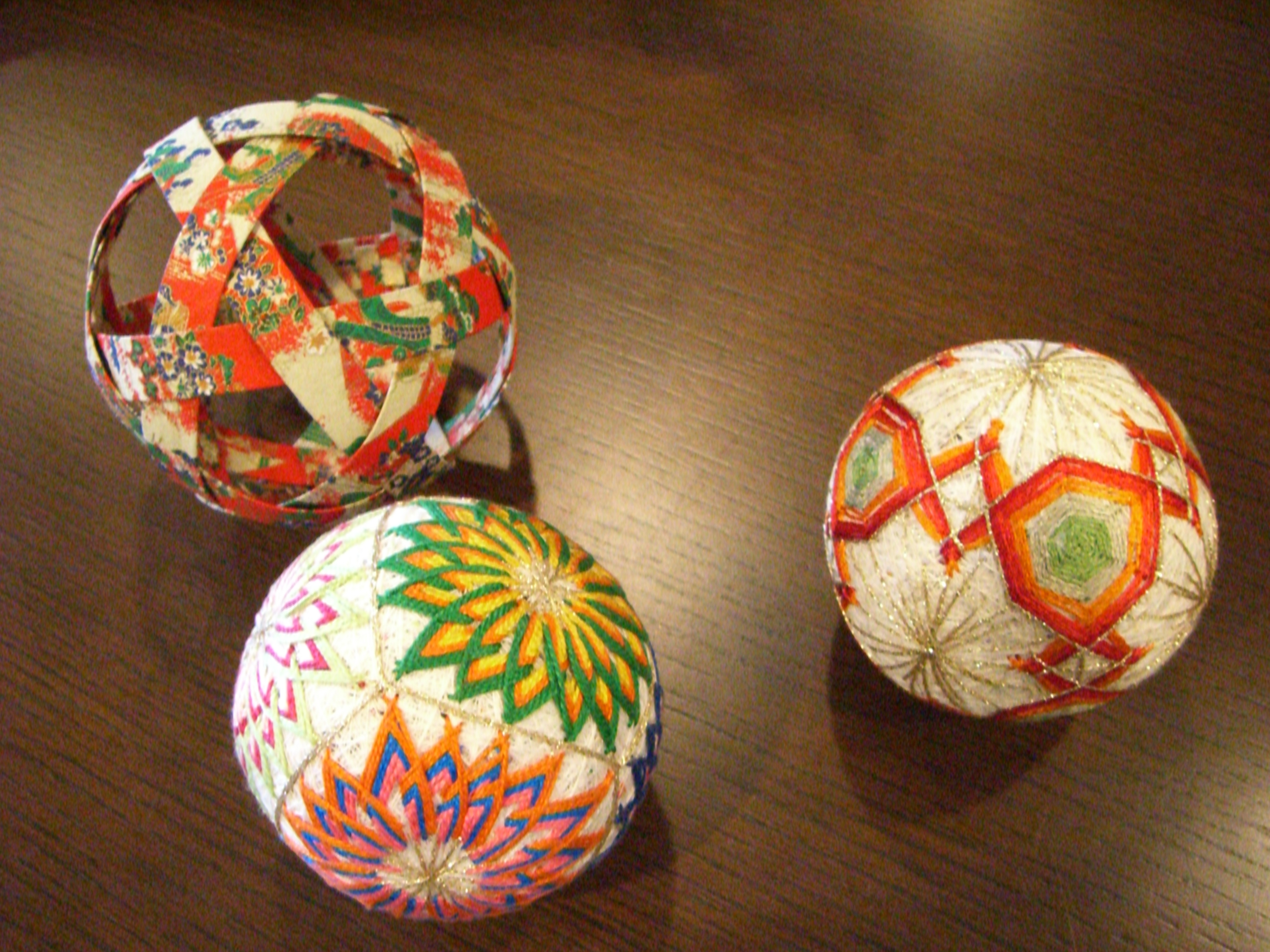
Three temari balls with different decorations

Temari (手毬) balls are a folk art form and Japanese craft, originating in China and introduced to Japan around the 7th century A.D. Temari means "hand ball" in Japanese. Balls made from embroidery may be used in handball games and other such similar games (e.g., hacky sack). An accessory similar in appearance (and constructed with similar techniques and materials), but with the addition of a hand-strap (made with either satin cord or ribbon) and a tassel, can serve as an accessory for a kimono, as a kimono bag.

== History ==
Historically, temari were constructed from the remnants of old kimono. Pieces of silk fabric would be wadded up to form a ball, and then the wad would be wrapped with strips of fabric. As time passed, traditional temari became an art, with the functional stitching becoming more decorative and detailed, until the balls displayed intricate embroidery. With the introduction of rubber to Japan, the balls went from toys to art objects, although mothers still make them for their children. Temari became an art and craft of the Japanese upper class and aristocracy, and noble women competed in creating increasingly beautiful and intricate objects, some even altered so as to double as handbags (like a kinchaku or a kimono bag). The popularity in the United States began in the 1980's with Japanese immigrant Mitsu Bergdoll of Dunkirk, Indiana. People from across the country ordered Temari thanks to her.

== Tradition ==
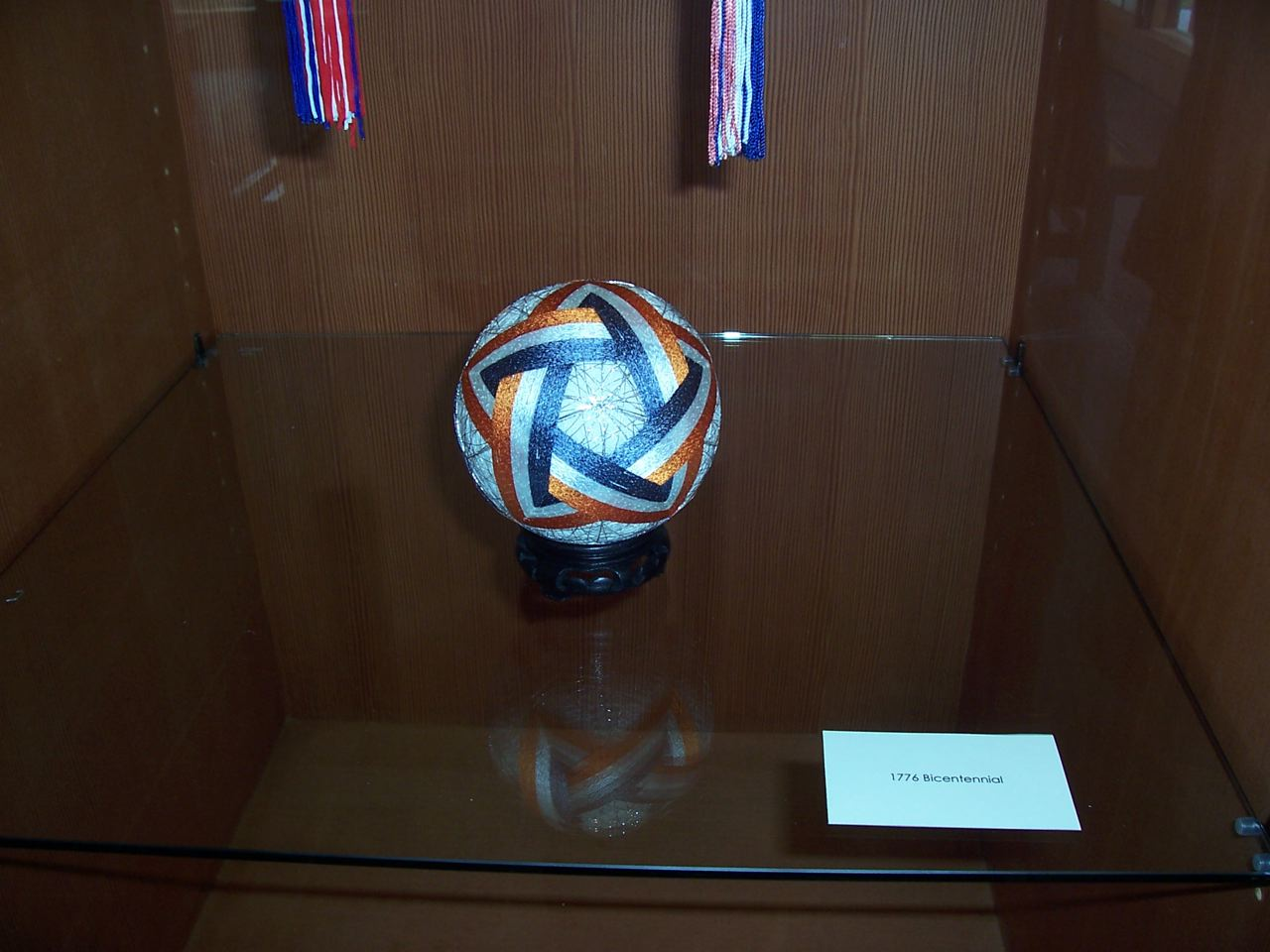
American bicentennial temari

Temari are highly valued and cherished gifts, symbolizing deep friendship and loyalty. Also, the brilliant colors and threads used are symbolic of wishing the recipient a brilliant and happy life. Traditionally, becoming a craftsman in Japan was a tedious process. Becoming a temari artist in Japan today requires specific training, and one must be tested on one's skills and technique before being acknowledged as a crafter of temari.

Traditionally, temari were often given to children from their parents on New Year's Day. Inside the tightly wrapped layers of each ball, the mother would have placed a small piece of paper with a goodwill wish for her child. The child would never be told what wish their mother had made while making the ball.

Alternately, some balls contained "noisemakers" consisting of rice grains or bells to add to the play value. It is said that traditional temari were wrapped so tightly they would bounce.

Temari are also known as gotenmari.

== Principles of construction ==
All temari are made according to some specific method of construction that involves dividing the mari into a number of sections through the use of temporarily placed pins and permanently placed threads. There are three "standard divisions" which are recognized: simple division (tanjun tōbun), 8-combination division (hachitōbun no kumiawase), and 10-combination division (jūtōbun no kumiawase).

== Influences ==
Several other kinds of objects that resemble temari have been created and named after them. These include

- Temari Sushi or Temarizushi (手まり寿司), a food that looks like temari
- Iroha Temari product line of vibrators that look like temari and which have won a Red Dot Design Award
