= Susan Goldstine =

American mathematician

Susan Goldstine is an American mathematician active in mathematics and fiber arts. She is a professor of mathematics at St. Mary's College of Maryland, and (for 2019–2022) the Steven Muller Distinguished Professor in the Sciences at St. Mary's College.

== Education and career ==
Goldstine graduated summa cum laude from Amherst College in 1993. She completed a Ph.D. in mathematics at Harvard University in 1998. Her dissertation, Spin Representations and Lattices, was supervised by Benedict Gross.

After postdoctoral and visiting assistant professorships at McMaster University, Ohio State University, and Amherst College, she joined the St. Mary's College faculty in 2004.

== Contributions ==
Goldstine has made and exhibited many pieces of mathematical art, often involving textiles. A set of bead crochet jewelry pieces by her visualizing the map coloring problem on three different manifolds won the prize for "best textile, sculpture, or other medium" in the art show of the 2015 Joint Mathematics Meetings.

She is the coauthor of the book Crafting Conundrums: Puzzles and Patterns for the Bead Crochet Artist (with Ellie Baker, A K Peters / CRC Press, 2014).

Combining her interests in mathematics and fiber arts she is one of 24 mathematicians and artists who make up the Mathemalchemy Team.

== Personal life ==
Goldstine is the granddaughter of teacher and author Bel Kaufman and the great-great-granddaughter of Sholem Aleichem.
