= Carolyn Yackel =

American mathematician

Carolyn Yackel is an American mathematician who has been Professor of Mathematics at Mercer University in Macon, Georgia since 2001. From 1998 to 2001 she was Max Zorn Visiting Assistant Professor of Mathematics at Indiana University.

Yackel's mother, Erna Beth Yackel, was a mathematics educator on the faculty at Purdue University Northwest. Originally trained as a commutative algebraist, her current interests center on mathematics education and mathematics in art, particularly as applied to fiber art. She specializes in the realization of geometric and topological structures through quilting, cross-stitching, crocheting, knitting, and embroidery.

She is on the Board of the Gathering 4 Gardner and also has a long association with The Bridges Conference.

== Early life and career ==
Yackel was born in West Lafayette, Indiana.

She received her S.B. in mathematics from the University of Chicago (1992) and her M.S. in mathematics from the University of Michigan (1994). She completed her PhD with the dissertation “Asymptotic Behavior of Annihilator Lengths in Certain Quotient Rings” under Melvin Hochster at the University of Michigan (1998).

Combining her interests in mathematics, quilting and knitting she is one of 24 mathematicians and artists who make up the Mathemalchemy Team.

== Books ==
- Proceedings of Bridges 2020: Mathematics, Art, Music, Architecture, Education, Culture, edited by Carolyn Yackel, Robert Bosch, Eve Torrence, and Kristof Fenyvesi, Tessellations Publishing, Phoenix, AZ 2020.
- Figuring Fibers, edited by belcastro, s-m and Yackel, C. A.. Providence, RI: American Mathematics Society, 2018.
- Crafting by Concepts: fiber arts and mathematics, edited by belcastro, s-m and Yackel, C. A., Natick, MA: AK Peters, 2011.
- Making Mathematics with Needlework: Ten Papers and Ten Projects, edited by belcastro, s. m. and Yackel, C. A.. Wellesley, MA: AK Peters, 2007.

== Selected papers ==
- Taalman, L. and Yackel, C. A. “Wallpaper Patterns for Lattice Designs” In Proceedings of Bridges 2020: Mathematics, Art, Music, Architecture, Education, Culture, 223–230, Tessellations Publishing, Phoenix, AZ 2020.
- Yackel, C. A. “Rhombic Triacontahedron” In Illustrating Mathematics, 26–27. American Mathematics Society, 2020.
- Yackel, C. A. “Treating Templeton Squares Like Truchet Tiles” In Figuring Fibers, Providence, RI: AMS, 2018.
- Yackel, C. “Report: The 2015 Joint Mathematics Meetings exhibition of mathematical art” Journal of Mathematics and the Arts. 10(1–4) (2016) 9–13.
- Yackel, C. “Teaching Temari: Geometrically Embroidered Spheres in the Classroom” In Proceedings of the 2012 Bridges Towson Conference, 563–566. Tessellations Publishing, Phoenix, AZ, USA. 2012.
- Yackel, C. A. “In Pursuit of Dancing Squares” Math Horizons September 2011, 19.
- Yackel, C. A. with belcastro, s-m. “Spherical Symmetries of Temari” In Crafting by Concepts, 151–185. AK Peters, 2011.
- Shepherd, M. with belcastro, s-m and Yackel, C. A. “Group Actions in Cross-stitch” In Crafting by Concepts, 151–185. AK Peters, 2011.
