= Elisabetta Matsumoto =

American physicist

- Occupation: Physics Professor
- Known for: studying knitted fabrics' special mathematical and mechanical properties

Elisabetta Matsumoto is an American physicist whose scientific interests include the study of knitted fabrics' special mathematical and mechanical properties.

After earning her PhD Matsumoto accepted a post-doctoral fellowship at Harvard University's Wyss Institute for Biologically Inspired Engineering.

In 2019 Matsumoto received five years of funding to study the mathematics of knitting from the National Science Foundation.

In 2019 Matsumoto was recognized with a National Science Foundation CAREER Award, a distinction the Foundation gives to particularly promising scientists relatively early in their careers.

The New York Times profiled Matsumoto following her popular presentations at the 2019 meeting of the American Physical Society.

Combining her interests in mathematics and the mechanical properties of knitting she is one of 24 mathematicians and artists who make up the Mathemalchemy Team.

== Education ==
- Postdoctoral fellow, applied mathematics, Harvard University
- Postdoctoral fellow, Princeton Center for Theoretical Science, Princeton University
- PhD in Physics, University of Pennsylvania, 2011
- MS in Physics, University of Pennsylvania, 2007
- BA in Physics, University of Pennsylvania, 2007
