= Journal of Mathematics and the Arts =

- Discipline: Mathematics, the arts
- Language: English
- Edited by: Mara Alagic

Publication details
- History: 2007–present
- Publisher: Taylor & Francis
- Frequency: Quarterly

Standard abbreviations
- ISO 4: J. Math. Arts

Indexing
- ISSN: 1751-3472 (print); 1751-3480 (web)

Links
- Journal homepage; Current issue; Online archive

The Journal of Mathematics and the Arts is a quarterly peer-reviewed academic journal that deals with relationship between mathematics and the arts.

The journal was established in 2007 and is published by Taylor & Francis. The editor-in-chief is Mara Alagic (Wichita State University, Kansas).
