= Clara Torres Latorre =

Spanish mathematician (born 1997)

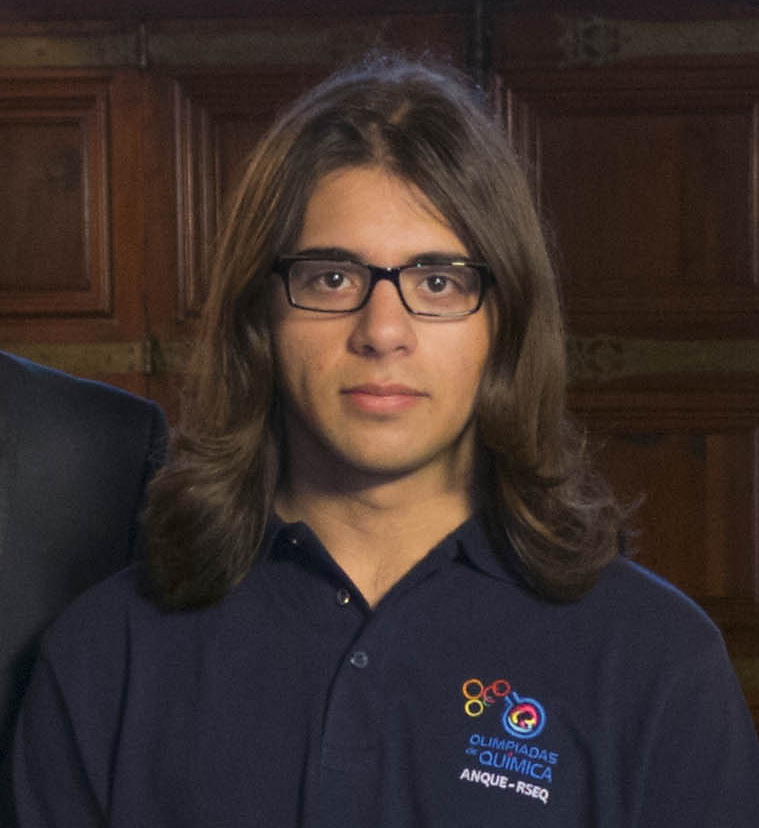
- Torres in 2014
- Born: 1997 (age 28–29); Alginet, Spain
- Education: Polytechnic University of Catalonia
- Occupation: Mathematician

Clara Torres Latorre (born 1997) is a Spanish mathematician. She holds 16 international titles, ten of which are gold medals. This achievement has made her the Valencian student with the best results in history in university-level math competitions.

== Career ==
Torres studied the Bachelor's Degree in Mathematics and Physical Engineering at the CFIS of the Polytechnic University of Catalonia as part of the Estalmat project. In 2014, she achieved gold medals in three high school science olympiads (mathematics, physics, and chemistry). That same year, she was honored at the Palace of the Generalitat Valenciana. Sir Harold Walter Kroto, Nobel Prize in Chemistry, went specifically to the Palace to meet Torres and her teammates.

For two consecutive years, in 2013 and 2014, Torres won gold medals in the Mediterranean Mathematics Competition. She also won gold in 2013, in Bolivia, at the Ibero-American Chemistry Olympiad (the greatest achievement in this discipline by any Spanish student). She later added four more golds in mathematics: in 2014, in Bucharest, she earned gold at the International Mathematical Arhimede Contest; in 2015, in Puerto Rico, she won absolute gold at the Ibero-American Mathematical Olympiad, leading the Spanish team that finished in third place. That same year, in Bulgaria at the International Mathematics Competition for University Students, she won another gold. In 2016, she repeated the achievement and also won gold in a speed programming competition in Porto.

In 2014, after placing in the top two positions for four years in the Kangaroo Math Contest, Torres Latorre received the Silver Pin, the highest award from the Catalan Mathematical Society for competitors who earn recognition all four years. In 2016, at the 30th Ibero-American Mathematics Olympiad, she also won another gold medal.

Years later, having fully embraced her gender identity as Clara, in June 2024 Torres Latorre obtained her PhD in Mathematics on the theory of regularity in obstacle problems of the Harnack inequality, from the University of Barcelona.

== Bibliography ==
- Espejas, Alejandro. Biography: A brushstroke of Damián through Mathematics (pp. 89–98), Spanish Mathematical Olympiad, 2014. Published by: University of Valencia; ISBN 978-84-370-9425-0
- Ledesma, Antonio, 50 Years of the Spanish Mathematical Olympiad (pp. 88–89); 2014; Utiel. Published by: Mathematics Border Collective; ISSN 2254-2159
