= RSME =

RSME may refer to:

- Religious spiritual mystical experience
- Royal School of Military Engineering
- 16S rRNA (uracil1498-N3)-methyltransferase (RsmE), an enzyme
- Royal Spanish Mathematical Society (Real Sociedad Matemática Española)

== See also ==
- Root mean square error (RMSE)
