= Victoria Otero =

President of the Spanish Royal Mathematical Society

María Victoria Otero Espinar (Lugo, 1962) is a Spanish mathematician who has served as president of the Royal Spanish Mathematical Society since January 2025. She was awarded the Medalla do Concello de Ames in 2022.

== Life ==
Otero earned her doctorate at the University of Santiago de Compostela, and then worked in the USA and France. Having returned to Spain, she is a professor in the Department of Statistics, Mathematical Analysis and Optimization at the University of Santiago de Compostela.

Between 2007 and 2019, Otero chaired the Professional Commission of the Royal Spanish Mathematical Society. From 2010 to 2014 she was president of the College of Deans and Directors of Centers of the USC. In 2016 she was appointed president of the RSME-RAE Commission and that same year, and until 2017, she chaired the Conference of Deans of Mathematics. In 2022 she was appointed first vice-president of the Royal Spanish Mathematical Society. In 2025, she became President. She is the third woman to lead the society, since it was founded in 1911, after Olga Gil Medrano and Eva Gallardo.

Otero works on non-linear differential equations, including functional analysis, dynamic systems and boundary problems. She has international collaborations with Ravi Agarwal (Florida Institute of Technology), Hyman Bass (Columbia University), Charles Tresser from the IBM Research Center, and Paul Glendinning (Cambridge University). She has previously been a visiting professor at the IBM Research, Thomas J. Watson Research Center in New York.

== Recognition ==
Otero was awarded the Medalla do Concello de Ames in 2022.
