= Alfonso Sorrentino =

Alfonso Sorrentino may refer to:

- Alfonso Sorrentino (mathematician) (born 1979), Italian mathematician and academic
- Mario Da Vinci (1942–2015), stage name of Italian singer Alfonso Sorrentino

== See also ==
- Alfonso
- Sorrentino
