= Catalan Mathematical Society =

Mathematical society in Catalonia

- Societat Catalana de Matemàtiques
- Abbreviation: SCM
- Formation: 1931; 95 years ago
- Type: Mathematical society
- Headquarters: Barcelona
- Location: Spain
- President: Montserrat Alsina i Aubach
- Awards: Maria Antònia Canals Prize; Emmy Noether Prize; Évariste Galois Prize; Albert Dou Prize; Barcelona Dynamical Systems Prize
- Website: scm.iec.cat

The Catalan Mathematical Society (Catalan: Societat Catalana de Matemàtiques, SCM) is a mathematical society in Barcelona, founded in 1931. The SCM is a member of the European Mathematical Society, and is recognised by the International Mathematical Union as one of the national mathematical societies of Spain. It is an affiliated society of the Institute for Catalan Studies, and they are headquartered together in Barcelona.

The Catalan Mathematical Society was founded in 1931 as the mathematics section of the Catalan Society of Physical, Chemical, and Mathematical Sciences. In 1986 the Society of Sciences split into separate Physical, Chemical, Engineering, and Mathematical Societies.

== Activities and publications ==
Every three years the Catalan Mathematical Society hosts the Barcelona Mathematical Days, a research congress covering all areas of mathematics. The SCM also organises the Spanish Mathematical Olympiad and Girls Mathematical Olympiad, in partnership with the Royal Spanish Mathematical Society.

The Catalan Mathematical Society manages several publications:

- The newsletter of the Catalan Mathematical Society is the SCM-Notícies, which is published in Catalan.
- The Catalan Mathematical Society publishes its bulletin Butlletí twice a year. It is the preeminent mathematical journal published in Catalan.
- The journal Noubiaix is jointly published by the SCM and the Catalan Federation of Associations of Mathematics Teachers. It is published in Catalan, and covers mathematics education at all levels.
- Reports@scm is an electronic English-language journal for short research papers by early-career mathematicians.

== Prizes ==
The Barcelona Dynamical Systems Prize of the SCM is awarded to the authors of a research paper in English on the topic of dynamical systems. The award is managed by Catalan mathematician Carles Simó, and has been given biennially since 2015. Past winners of the prize are:

- 2015 – Alberto Enciso and Daniel Peralta-Salas
- 2017 – Jordi-Lluís Figueras, Àlex Haro, and Alejandro Luque
- 2019 – Vadim Kaloshin and Alfonso Sorrentino
- 2023 – Massimiliano Berti, Alberto Maspero, and Paolo Ventura

The Maria Antònia Canals Prize is awarded jointly with three other Spanish mathematical societies for an "innovative classroom experience", and aims to promote innovation in mathematics teaching. It is named for Catalan mathematician Maria Antònia Canals.

The Évariste Galois Prize is awarded annually since 1962 to a student for research work included in their master's thesis or at an early stage of their doctoral studies. The prize is named for French mathematician Évariste Galois.

The Emmy Noether Prize has been annually awarded since 2016 to the best bachelor's thesis defended that year by a student of mathematics at either the Autonomous University of Barcelona, the University of Barcelona, or the Polytechnic University of Catalonia. It is named for German mathematician Emmy Noether.

The Albert Dou prize is awarded biennially to the author of a work "showing the importance of mathematics in our world." It was first awarded in 2010, and is named for Catalan mathematician Albert Dou i Mas de Xexàs, who died in 2009.

== Presidents ==
The 2022–2026 president of the SCM is Montserrat Alsina i Aubach of the Polytechnic University of Catalonia. The past presidents of the Catalan Mathematical Society are:

President	Period	Institution
Joan Girbau i Badó	1986–1990	Autonomous University of Barcelona
Josep Vaquer i Timoner	1990–1995	University of Barcelona
Sebastià Xambó i Descamps	1995–2002	Polytechnic University of Catalonia
Carles Casacuberta i Vergés	2002–2006	University of Barcelona
Carles Perelló i Valls	2006–2010	Autonomous University of Barcelona
Joan de Solà-Morales i Rubió	2010–2014	Polytechnic University of Catalonia
Xavier Jarque i Ribera	2014–2018	University of Barcelona
Dolors Herbera i Espinal	2018–2022	Autonomous University of Barcelona
Montserrat Alsina i Aubach	2022–present	Polytechnic University of Catalonia

== See also ==
- List of mathematical societies
