= Kaloshin =

Kaloshin (Russian: Калошин) is a Russian masculine surname, its feminine counterpart is Kaloshina. Notable people with the surname include:

- Pavel Kaloshin (born 1998), Russian footballer
- Vadim Kaloshin, Ukrainian mathematician
