= Sorrentino =

Sorrentino (Italian: [sorrenˈtiːno]) is a surname of Italian origin, meaning literally "Sorrentinian" or "from Sorrento". Notable people with the surname include:

- Andrea Sorrentino (born 1982), Italian comic book artist
- Beth Sorrentino, American pianist and pop singer
- Christopher Sorrentino (born 1963), American novelist and short story writer; son of Gilbert
- Claudio Sorrentino (1945–2021), Italian actor
- Dario Sorrentino (1957–2021), Italian medical researcher
- Domenico Sorrentino (born 1948), Italian Roman Catholic archbishop
- Fernando Sorrentino (born 1942), Argentine short-story writer
- Gilbert Sorrentino (1929–2006), American author and poet
- Jonah Sorrentino (born 1975), American Christian rapper
- Lorenzo Sorrentino (born 1995), Italian footballer
- Michael Sorrentino (born 1982), American television personality
- Paolo Sorrentino (born 1970), Italian film director and screenwriter
- Rosanne Sorrentino (born 1968), American actress, Annie
- Stefano Sorrentino (born 1979), Italian football player
- Tonino Sorrentino (born 1985), Italian football player
- Tony Sorrentino (politician) (fl. 2020s), American politician from Nebraska

== See also ==
- Sorrenti
