= Pedro Luis García Pérez =

Spanish mathematician, physicist and academic (1938–2025)

Pedro Luis García Pérez (23 March 1938 – 2 January 2025) was a Spanish mathematician, physicist, and academic. He was president of the Royal Spanish Mathematical Society from 1982 to 1988.

== Death ==
García Pérez died on 2 January 2025, at the age of 86.
