= John N. Mather =

American mathematician (1942–2017)

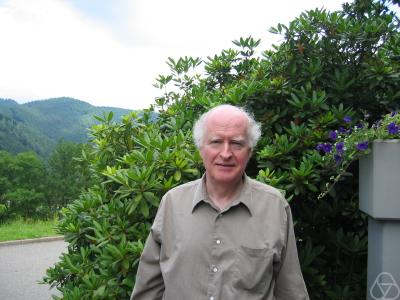
- Mather at Oberwolfach in 2005
- Born: John Norman Mather; June 9, 1942; Los Angeles, California, U.S.
- Died: January 28, 2017 (aged 74); Princeton, New Jersey, U.S.
- Education: Harvard University; Princeton University
- Known for: Smooth functions Topologically stratified space Aubry–Mather theory Mather theory Mather division theorem
- Awards: John J. Carty Award for the Advancement of Science (1978); National Order of Scientific Merit (Brazil) (2000); George David Birkhoff Prize (2003); Brouwer Medal (2014)
- Scientific career
- Fields: Mathematics
- Workplaces: Institut des Hautes Études Scientifiques; Harvard University; Princeton University
- Doctoral advisor: John Milnor
- Doctoral students: Giovanni Forni (1993); Vadim Kaloshin (2001); Alfonso Sorrentino (2008)

John Norman Mather (June 9, 1942 – January 28, 2017) was a mathematician at Princeton University known for his work on singularity theory and Hamiltonian dynamics.

== Biography ==
He was descended from Atherton Mather (1663–1734), a cousin of Cotton Mather. His father, Norman Mather, was a Princeton University professor of electrical engineering.

He spent his undergraduate years at Harvard University (BA 1964) and his graduate years at Princeton University (Ph.D. 1967).

In 1969, after two years spent at the Institut des Hautes Etudes Scientifiques, Mather was appointed Associate Professor at Harvard University. He was promoted to Full Professor in 1971. He taught Math 55. Some of his students in that class included Bill Gates and Peter Galison.

In 1974 Mather accepted a visiting Professorship at Princeton University, joining his father on the University faculty. His position was converted to a Full Professorship the following year.

He was a member of the National Academy of Sciences beginning in 1988. He received the John J. Carty Award of the National Academy of Sciences in 1978 (for pure mathematics) and the George David Birkhoff Prize in applied mathematics in 2003. He also received the Brazilian Order of Scientific Merit in 2000 and the Brouwer Medal from the Royal Dutch Mathematical Society in 2014.

== Contributions ==
His early work dealt with the stability of smooth mappings between smooth manifolds of dimensions n (for the source manifold N) and p (for the target manifold P). He determined the precise dimensions (n,p) for which smooth mappings are stable with respect to smooth equivalence by diffeomorphisms of the source and target (i.e., infinitely differentiable coordinate changes).

Mather also proved the conjecture of the French topologist René Thom that under topological equivalence smooth mappings are generically stable: the subset of the space of smooth mappings between two smooth manifolds consisting of the topologically stable mappings is a dense subset in the smooth Whitney topology. His notes on the topic of topological stability are still a standard reference on the topic of topologically stratified spaces.

In the 1970s, Mather switched to the field of dynamical systems. He made the following main contributions to dynamical systems that deeply influenced the field.

- He introduced the concept of Mather spectrum and gave a characterization of Anosov diffeomorphisms.
- Jointly with Richard McGehee, he gave an example of collinear four-body problem which has initial conditions leading to solutions that blow up in finite time. This was the first result that made the Painlevé conjecture plausible.
- He developed a variational theory for the globally action minimizing orbits for twist maps (convex Hamiltonian systems of two degrees of freedom), along the line of the work of George David Birkhoff, Marston Morse, Gustav A. Hedlund, et al. This theory is now known as Aubry–Mather theory.
- He developed the Aubry–Mather theory in higher dimensions, a theory which is now called Mather theory. This theory turned out to be deeply related to the viscosity solution theory of Michael G. Crandall, Pierre-Louis Lions et al. for Hamilton–Jacobi equation. The link was revealed in the weak KAM theory of Albert Fathi.
- He announced a proof of Arnold diffusion for nearly integrable Hamiltonian systems with three degrees of freedom. He prepared the technique, formulated a proper concept of genericity and made some important progresses towards its solution.
- In a series of papers, he proved that for certain regularity r, depending on the dimension of the smooth manifold M, the group Diff(M, r) is perfect, i.e. equal to its own commutator subgroup, where Diff(M, r) is the group of C^r diffeomorphisms of a smooth manifold M that are isotopic to the identity through a compactly supported C^r isotopy. He also constructed counterexamples where the regularity-dimension condition is violated.

Mather was one of the three editors of the Annals of Mathematics Studies series published by Princeton University Press.

== See also ==
- List of members of the National Academy of Sciences
