= Consuelo Martínez =

Spanish mathematician

Consuelo Martínez López (born 1955) is a Spanish mathematician, and a frequent collaborator of Fields Medalist Efim Zelmanov. Her research topics include abstract algebra including group theory and superalgebras, algebraic coding theory, and cryptography. She is the professor of algebra at the University of Oviedo.

== Education and career ==
Martínez was born in 1955 in Ferrol, Spain, the daughter of a teacher. She earned a licenciate in mathematics in 1977 from the University of Zaragoza, and completed her Ph.D. at the University of Zaragoza in 1980. Her dissertation, Formaciones saturadas en una clase de grupos localmente finitos PI-resolubles, concerned group theory, and was supervised by Javier Otal. She became professor of algebra at the University of Oviedo in 2005.

As well as her research and teaching in mathematics, Martínez has participated in joint work of the Royal Spanish Academy and Royal Spanish Mathematical Society to include mathematical terminology in the Diccionario de la lengua española.

== Recognition ==
In 2018, Martínez won both the medal of the Royal Spanish Mathematical Society, and the Julio Peláez Prize for women in the sciences, given by the Tatiana Pérez de Guzmán el Bueno Foundation.

She was elected as a corresponding member of the Spanish Royal Academy of Sciences in 2021.
