= María Teresa Lozano Imízcoz =

Spanish emeritus professor and mathematician

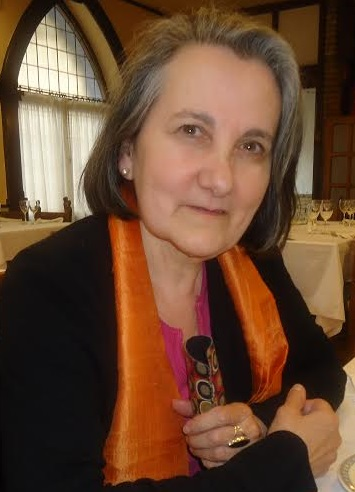
- Born: July 31, 1946 (age 80); Pamplona, Spain
- Education: University of Zaragoza
- Scientific career
- Fields: Mathematics
- Workplaces: University of Wisconsin; University of Zaragoza
- Thesis: (1974)

María Teresa Lozano Imízcoz (born July 31, 1946) is a Spanish emeritus professor and mathematician. She studies topology principally in three dimensions. She has been awarded a Royal Spanish Mathematical Society (RSME) medal for her career and as a trailblazer for women to be involved in mathematical research.

== Life ==
Lozano was born in Pamplona in 1946. In 1969 she obtained a degree and five years later she completed her doctorate in mathematics at the University of Zaragoza. Her postdoctoral work began at the University of Wisconsin, where she was an honorary fellow. In 1978 she returned to Spain where she became a professor at the University of Zaragoza.

In 1990 she was made the Professor of Geometry and Topology. She was the first professor and the first director in her university's Faculty of Sciences. She was also the first emeritus professor of her faculty.

== Memberships ==
In 1996 she became an Academician of the Royal Academy of Exact, Physical, Chemical and Natural Sciences of Zaragoza. In 2006 she became a Corresponding Academician of the Spanish Royal Academy of Sciences.

In 2016 she was awarded the Royal Spanish Mathematical Society (RSME) Medal in recognition of the 40 years that she had contributed to the mathematics profession. The citation mentioned her dissemination work and her studies with Hugh Michael Hilden and Vicente Montesinos on knot theory and 3-dimensional topology. The newspapers also mentioned her as a trailblazer for women to be involved in mathematical research.
