= Royal Spanish Mathematical Society =

Spanish professional society

Real Sociedad Matemática Española
- President: Victoria Otero
- Parent organization: International Mathematical Union and European Mathematical Society
- Website: RSME Website

The Royal Spanish Mathematical Society (Spanish: Real Sociedad Matemática Española, RSME) is the main professional society of Spanish mathematicians and represents Spanish mathematics within the European Mathematical Society (EMS) and the International Mathematical Union (IMU).

== History ==
The RSME was founded in 1911 by a group of mathematicians, among whom were Luis Octavio de Toledo y Zulueta and Julio Rey Pastor, under the name of the Spanish Mathematical Society. The initiative arose at the first congress of the Spanish Association for the Progress of Science (AEPC), where the convenience of establishing a mathematics society was raised.

Throughout its more than 100 years it has gone through various stages of greater or lesser activity. Since 1996, it has been in one of its most active periods, counting in August 2005 about 1700 members, among which there are individual members, as well as institutional members such as, for example, university faculties and departments and high school institutes.

It has reciprocal agreements with a large number of mathematical societies around the world. It is one of the societies that forms part of the Spanish Mathematical Committee and is an institutional member of the European Mathematical Society (EMS) and of the Confederation of Spanish Scientific Societies (COSCE).

=== Presidents ===
- José Echegaray y Eizaguirre: 1911-1916
- Zoel García de Galdeano: 1916-1920
- Leonardo Torres Quevedo: 1920-1924
- Luis Octavio de Toledo y Zulueta: 1924-1934
- Julio Rey Pastor: 1934-1934
- Juan López Soler: 1935-1937
- José Barinaga: 1937-1939
- Juan López Soler: 1939-1954
- Julio Rey Pastor: 1955-1961
- Alberto Dou Mas de Xaxàs: 1961-1963
- Francisco Botella: 1963-1970
- Enrique Linés Escardó: 1970-1976
- José Javier Etayo: 1976-1982
- Pedro Luis García Pérez: 1982-1988
- José Manuel Aroca: 1988-1996
- Antonio Martínez Naveira: 1996-2000
- Carlos Andradas: 2000-2006
- Olga Gil Medrano: 2006-2009
- Antonio Campillo López: 2009-2015
- Francisco Marcellán Español: 2015-2022
- Eva Gallardo: 2022-2025
- Victoria Otero: 2025-

== Activities ==
The RSME actively collaborates with other scientific societies in Spain in various activities such as the celebration, in 2000, of the World Year of Mathematics, the preparation of the Spanish candidacy and the subsequent organization of the International Congress of Mathematicians (ICM) that was held in August 2006 in Madrid and the work of the Senate Report on the teaching of science in secondary education (2003-04 academic year).

The RSME prepares, through its various commissions, reports on topics such as the situation of mathematical research in Spain, the problems of teaching mathematics in high school, the situation of mathematics in relation to the European higher education area, professional opportunities and the participation of women in mathematical research.

In addition, it is involved in international cooperation projects: digitization of mathematical literature, support of mathematics in Latin America, among others. The society organized the first Meeting of Latin American Mathematical Societies that took place in September 2003 in Santiago de Compostela, one of the results of which was the creation of the Network of Latin American Mathematical Organizations.

=== Fixed activities ===
Among the fixed activities of the RSME we can highlight:

- Organize annually, since 1964, the Spanish Mathematical Olympiad: a competition in which the high school students who form the Spanish team that participate in the International Mathematical Olympiad and the Ibero-American one are selected and prepared. In 2004 the final phase of the Ibero-American Mathematical Olympiad was organized in Castellón, and in 2008 the final phase of the International Mathematical Olympiad was held in Madrid.
- Congresses that are held approximately every two years. In them, plenary lectures are scheduled for a wide audience as well as more specialized special sessions on specific research topics in the different areas of mathematics and its applications, including the history and didactics of mathematics. Among the most prominent, in June 2003 the first joint congress with the American Mathematical Society was held in Seville, in February 2005 the first joint congress organized in collaboration with the Spanish Society of Applied Mathematics, the Statistical Society and Operative Research and the Catalan Mathematical Society, in 2007 the first joint congress with the Société Mathématique de France was held in Zaragoza, in 2009 the first joint meeting with the Mexican Mathematical Society took place in Oaxaca, which has been held every two years since then, and in 2011 it was held in Ávila in a congress commemorating the centenary of the RSME.
- Scientific Sessions: two or three a year are organized on specific research topics with a duration of one day (two at the most) in different universities, they have taken place for example in Zaragoza, Salamanca, Cantabria, Barcelona, Seville, Elche, Alicante, Polytechnic of Catalonia and La Rioja.
- Summer School of Mathematical Research "Lluís Santaló". It has been held at the Menéndez Pelayo International University since 2002.
- School of Mathematical Education "Miguel de Guzmán", held for the first time in 2005 in La Coruña.
- The Divulgamat website is a virtual center for the dissemination of Mathematics.

=== Awards ===
- Medals of the Royal Spanish Mathematical Society: are distinctions that express the public recognition of the community for outstanding people for their contributions in any area of mathematical endeavor. Its first edition was in 2015
  - 2020 María Jesús Carro Rossell, Antonio Ros Mulero.
  - 2019 Marisa Fernández Rodríguez, Jesús María Sanz Serna, Sebastià Xambó.
  - 2018 Consuelo Martínez, Adolfo Quirós, Juan Luis Vázquez.
  - 2017 Antonio Campillo López, Manuel de León Rodríguez, Marta Sanz-Solé
  - 2016 José Bonet Solves, María Gaspar Alonso-Vega, María Teresa Lozano Imízcoz
  - 2015 José Luis Fernández Pérez, Marta Macho Stadler, Antonio Martínez Naveira
- Premio José Luis Rubio de Francia: It is one of the most important mathematics awards in Spain, and the highest distinction awarded by the RSME. It is aimed at young researchers in mathematics who are Spanish or who have carried out their work in Spain. The first edition was in 2004 and is awarded annually.

The list of winners is as follows:

  - 2021: Ujué Etayo Rodriguez
  - 2020: Daniel Sanz Alonso
  - 2019: María Ángeles García Ferrero
  - 2018: Joaquim Serra Montolí
  - 2017: Angelo Lucia
  - 2016: Xavier Ros-Oton
  - 2015: Roger Casals
  - 2014: Nuno Freitas
  - 2013: Ángel Castro Martínez
  - 2012: María Pe Pereira
  - 2011: Alberto Enciso Carrasco
  - 2010: Carlos Beltrán Álvarez
  - 2009: Álvaro Pelayo
  - 2008: Francisco Gancedo
  - 2007: Pablo Mira Carrillo
  - 2006: Santiago Morales Domingo
  - 2005: Javier Parcet
  - 2004: Joaquim Puig
- Premio Vicent Caselles: Annual distinction to young Spanish researchers whose doctoral work is pioneering and influential in international research in mathematics. The first edition was in 2015 and 6 awards are awarded annually
  - 2021: Jon Asier Bárcena, Xavier Fernández-Real, José Ángel González-Prieto, Mercedes Pelegrín García, Abraham Rueda y María de la Paz Tirado
  - 2020: María Cumplido, Judit Muñoz Matute, Ujué Etayo, Diego Alonso Orán, Alessandro Audrito, Rubén Campoy García
  - 2019: María Ángeles García Ferrero, Marithania Silvero, Umberto Martínez Peñas, Daniel Álvarez Gavela, Xabier García Martínez y Carlos Mudarra
  - 2018: David Beltran, David Gómez Castro, David González Álvaro, Vanesa Guerrero, Álvaro del Pino, Carolina Vallejo Rodríguez
  - 2017: Óscar Domínguez Bonilla, Javier Gómez Serrano, Angelo Lucia, María Medina, Marina Murillo, Beatriz Sinova, Félix del Teso
  - 2016: Roger Casals, Francesc Castellà, Leonardo Colombo, José Manuel Conde Alonso, Martín López García, Jesús Yepes Nicolás
  - 2015: Alejandro Castro Castilla, Jezabel Curbelo Hernández, Javier Fresán Leal, Rafael Granero Belinchón, Luís Hernández Corbato, Xavier Ros Oton

=== Publications ===
- Publications periodical: members receive the RSME Gazette quarterly published since 1998, a magazine with varied mathematical content. In addition, a newsletter is sent weekly email with the most outstanding news. From April 2005 to October 2007, the electronic magazine was part of the publications of this society. Matematicalia, oriented to mathematical dissemination.
- Publications periodical: Among the non-periodical publications, the similar editions of the works stand out. Introductio in analysin infinitorum, of Leonhard Euler, and De Analysi per Aequationes Numero Terminorum Infinitas, of Isaac Newton, both with commented translation into Spanish. He also has another series, "Publicaciones de la Real Sociedad Matemática Española", consisting of conference proceedings sponsored by the RSME.
- The RSME publishes collections of books, scientific and popular texts, in collaboration with publishers and scientific societies, and a research journal, the Ibero-American Mathematical Magazine.
- RSME works with the Basque Center of Applied Mathematics, mathematical societies in Spain (ESTALMAT, Sociedad Matemática Aplicada), the government of Spain, the Institute of Mathematical Sciences, and several Spanish universities (University minister).
