= Casa de la Ciutat (Valencia) =

Coordinates: 39°28′35.7″N 0°22′33.14″W

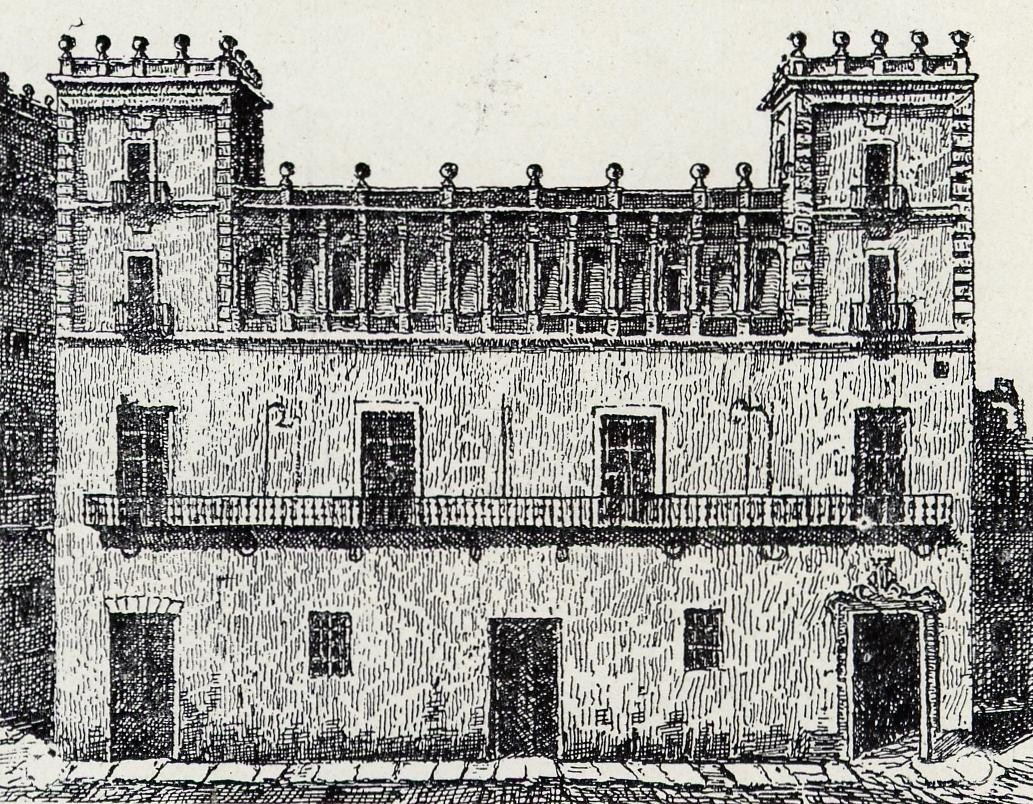
Facade of the Casa de la Ciutat, Valencia

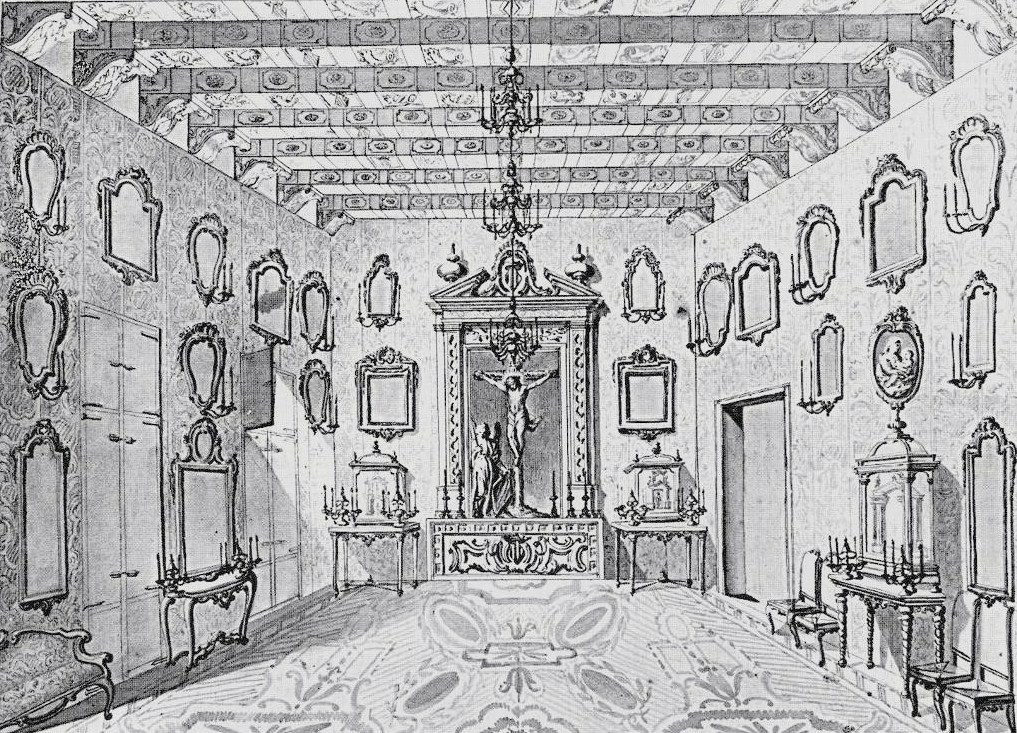
Inside of the Hall of the council or Hall of the Angels of the Casa de la Ciutat, Valencia (c. 17th century)

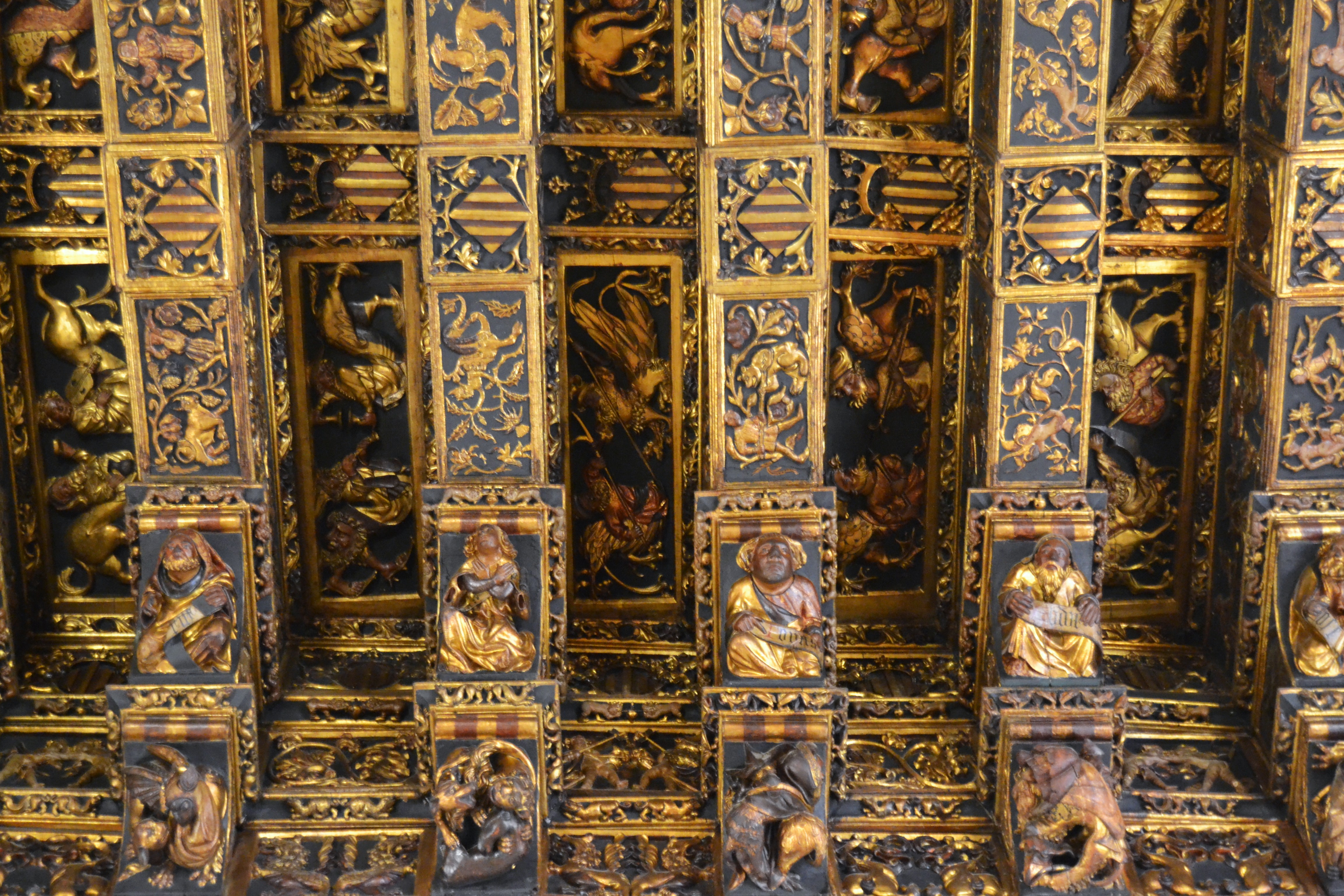
Detail of the roof of the Casa de la Ciutat, Valencia. Now preserved in the Llotja de la Seda.

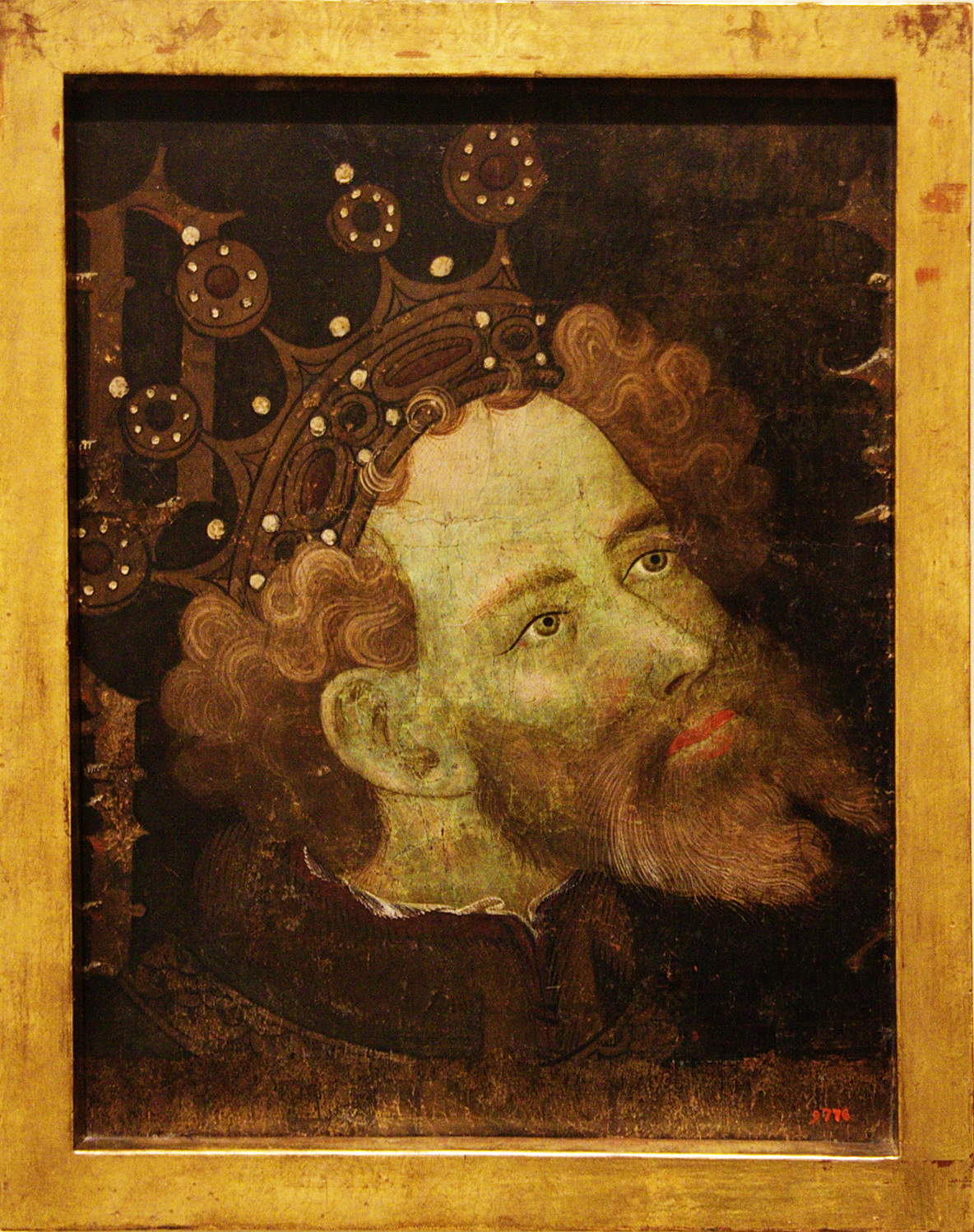
Peter IV of Aragon (1427) by Gonçal Peris Sarrià and Jaume Mateu. It comes from the Hall of the Council of Casa de la Ciutat until 1859. Now preserved in the Museu d'Art de Catalunya.

The Casa de la Ciutat (in Spanish: Casa de la Ciudad), or what is now called the City Hall, was in the place where today the Gardens known as de la Audiencia or more commonly the gardens next to the Palau de la Generalitat Valenciana. It was therefore the headquarters of the Municipal Council of Valencia.

== History and description ==
The King James I of Aragon granted houses and privilege to build the Casa de la Ciutat in the 13th century in a place near the present plaza de la Almoina and near the Archbishop's Palace, but this will be place in any case interim.

The first Casa de la Ciutat in its usual location is built in 1302, but will be in 1311 when King James II of Aragon authorized to expand the locals which by then had become too small. Officially the Casa de la Ciutat would be completed in 1342 and would lodge halls for the juries of the city (Sala del Consejo), Hall of inkstand, courts of justices of criminal and civil, imprisonment of men and women, offices of notaries, Hall of the Rational, Hall of Archives, halls for tax administrators, and a Hall dedicated exclusively to Chapel, made around 1454 and as presumably was one of the most important of the Casa. In 1517 the master builder Jaume Vicent would make a new Chapel with ribbed vaulted roofs. In 1376 the building was wide again to build a hall for the called Secret Council or Council of the Juries, and another hall for tax administrators. In these works involved the major master of the walls and moats of the city Bernat Boix.

By 1392 the painter Marçal de Sax decorate with murals the walls of the Hall of the Secret Council, with scenes of the Last Judgment, the Heaven, the Hell and the Guardian Angel of the city.

Between 1418 and 1426 it concludes the so-called Golden Hall, well known for the rich paneled ceiling (roof) that it closed. The hall it devoted to representative and ceremonial functions. Between 1421 and 1423 are constructed new halls that are expanding the perimeter and height of the building. In 1458 still it is working on minor details of the halls.

In 1423 the Great Hall of the Council suffered a fire consuming the roof of it. Between 1425 and 1428 are made the repair work that would run under the direction of Joan del Poyo and is constructed a new wooden roof. Once rebuilt this hall would be known as Hall of the Angels because of the large number of angels with shields of the city that decorated the roof. On February 15, 1586, the Casa de la Ciutat suffers another fire, this time dreadful, and had to be rebuilt largely. That last fire apparently was caused by the prisoners serving sentences in the jails that were on the ground floor of the building.

One of the direct consequences of the fire was that some of the prisoners were to be transferred to the House of the Brotherhood of San Narciso, (at the beginning of the calle Salvador) and from that time this house would be known as Prison of San Narciso.

Between 1854 and 1860 the municipal building that threatened ruin was demolished and its dependencies were moved to the current City Hall, then House of Education of girls created by Archbishop Mayoral in the 18th century.
