= Palace of the Generalitat Valenciana =

Historic palace and current government building in Valencia, Spain

- Palau de la Generalitat Valenciana
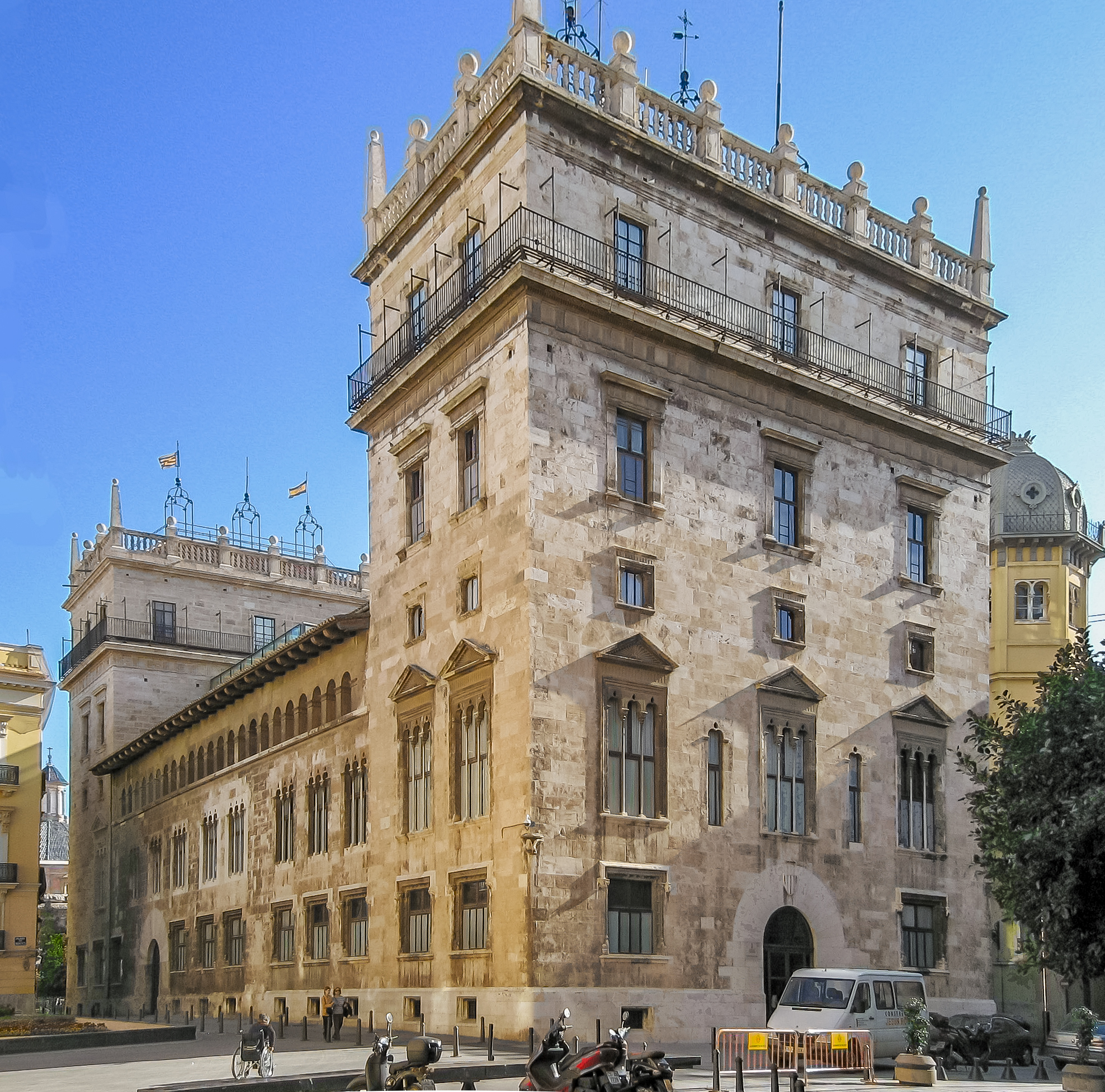
- Façade of the modern tower facing the Plaça de Manises
- Interactive map of the Palace of the Generalitat Valenciana area
- Alternative names: Palacio de la Generalidad Valenciana

General information
- Type: Monument
- Location: València, Valencian Community, Spain, Valencia, Spain
- Coordinates: 39.4767°N 0.376689°W
- Construction started: 1421
- Completed: 1593
- Renovated: 1982
- Governing body: Generalitat Valenciana

Design and construction
- Architects: Pere Comte, Joan Guivarró, Joan Corbera, Gaspar Gregori

Renovating team
- Architect: Alberto Peñín

Website
- Generalitat Website

The Palace of the Generalitat Valenciana, (Valencian: Palau de la Generalitat Valenciana; Spanish: Palacio de la Generalidad Valenciana) is a historic palace dating from the 15th century, initially built in the Valencian Gothic style with later Renaissance additions and changes. Today, it houses the offices of the executive of the Generalitat Valenciana.

In 1931, it was designated a Bien de Interés Cultural made from local materials such as stone from Godella and Rocafort, tiles from Manises and Paterna, marble from Serra del Buixcarró, and wood carved from native forests.

The palace is located in La Seu neighborhood^{in ES} in the Ciutat Vella district^{in ES} of the city of Valencia. It is located between Carrer dels Cavallers on the south, Carrer Bailia on the north, and between Plaça de Manises^{in CA} to the west and Plaza of the Virgin to the east. This is one of the oldest parts of the city, where one also finds the Metropolitan Cathedral, the Basilica of Our Lady of the Forsaken, the Palace of Fuentehermosa,^{in ES} and the Palace of Batlia.^{in CA}

While it currently serves as the headquarters of the government of the Valencian Community, the building has had various names during its long existence:

- Palace of the Diputació del General (or Generalitat) of the Kingdom of Valencia (1421–1705)
- Real Audiencia (1750–1923)
- Provincial Council (1923–1982)
- Popular Executive Committee (1936–1937)
- Generalitat Valenciana (1982–present)

The Palace of the Generalitat of Valencia, like that of Catalonia, is one of the few buildings of medieval origin in Europe that remains the seat of the government and the institution that built it, the Generalitat of the Kingdom of Valencia. In addition to its political symbolism, it is one of the best examples of Valencian civil architecture of the period, built by the master craftsmen of the time.

== Function ==
The original Generalitat—or Diputació del General—was a delegated commission of the Valencian Corts or Parliament, and was created in 1362. It was in charge of the management and administration of taxes paid to the Crown by the three branches of the Corts: ecclesiastical, military, and civil. The precarious economic situation of the Crown of Aragon, of which the Kingdom of Valencia was a part at the beginning of the 15th century, would lead to the consolidation of taxation by the Corts of Montsó.^{in CA} The Generalitats were created to collect and manage the taxes and the members were called deputies.

In 1404, the Valencian Corts appointed 32 deputies to the Generalitat—made up of eight members each representing the royal, civil, military, and ecclesiastical arms—in order to legislate on matters that were considered minor by the Corts. In 1418, King Alfonso the Magnanimous made the Generalitat of the Kingdom of Valencia the organ of administration of the kingdom's funds and the highest representative of the kingdom in the absence of the Corts. The palace was begun in 1421 with the aim of housing this entity.

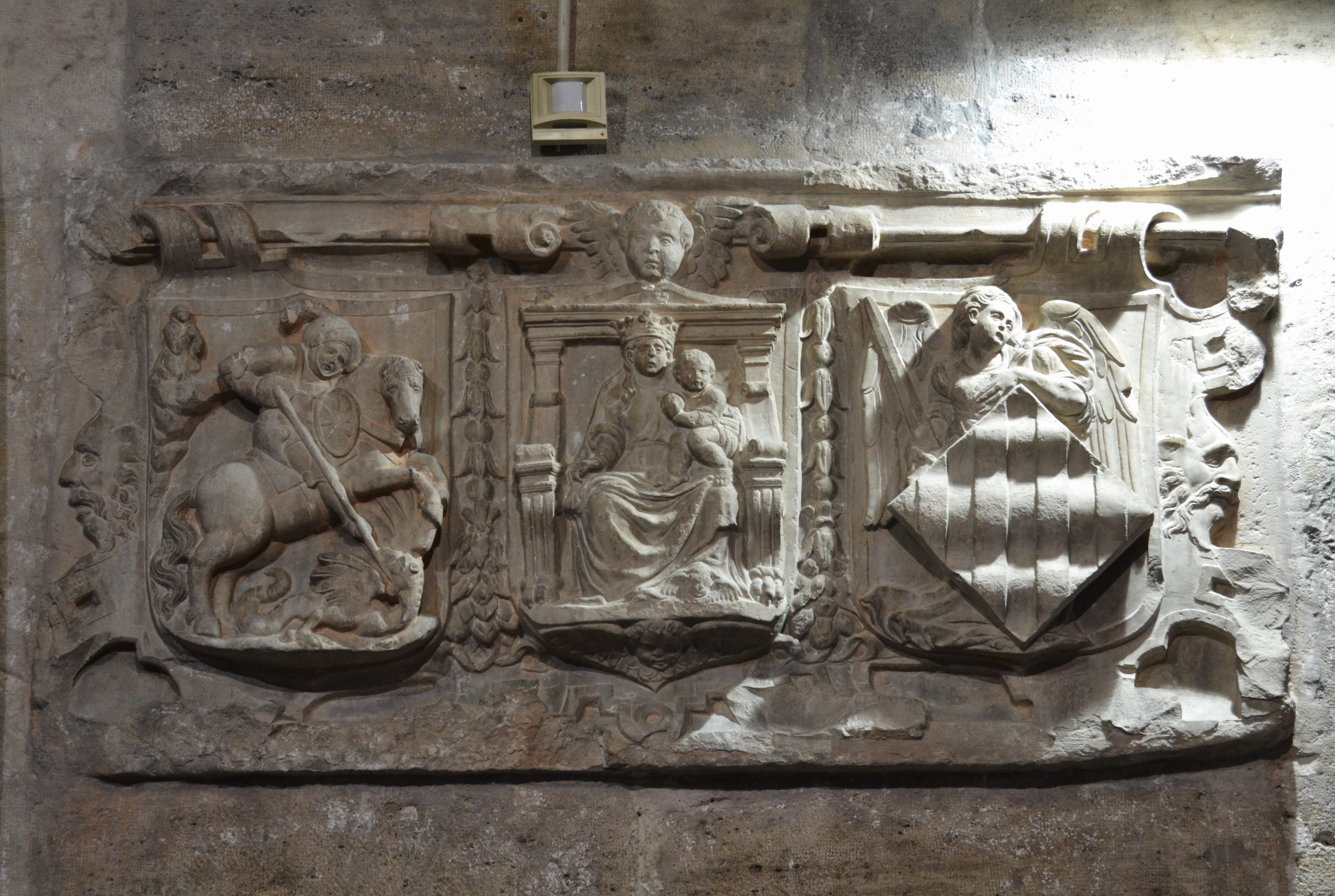
Emblems of the three estates of the Generalitat Valenciana: military, church, and civic

The old emblem of the Generalitat, seen throughout the palace, was made up of Saint George, representing the military and nobility, the Virgin Mary, representing the church, and the Guardian Angel, representing the civic life of the royal cities and towns. Today this emblem is that of the Valencian Corts, and for the Generalitat, the heraldry of King Peter the Ceremonious is used, which consists of a four-barred shield inclined to the right, accompanied by a crowned silver helmet, an azure mantle, a curvilinear cross pattée and, at the top, a winged dragon.

After the War of the Spanish Succession, in 1707 King Philip V abolished the Furs of Valencia, disbanding the Generalitat and leaving the building without a use. Thereafter, the building housed the Real Audiencia or Territorial Court from 1751 to 1923, the year in which the Provincial Council was installed. After the advent of the current democracy and the recovery of the Valencian institutions, it was once again the seat of the Generalitat and a symbol of Valencian unity and identity. In 1978, it once again housed the Council and the Corts, but in 1984 the Corts was moved to the Palace of the Borgias (Valencian: Palau de Benicarló,^{in CA}) and the building was used exclusively by the Council of the Generalitat Valenciana (Valencian: Consell de la Generalitat Valenciana^{in CA}).

== Building Chronology ==
The architecture of the building represents a mix of artistic styles that move from Gothic, passing through the Renaissance, to the Herrerian style. The original building is Mediterranean Gothic with an open patio, an open staircase, an ogival or gothic door on the mezzanine as well as on the façade, and lintel windows on the mezzanine as well as in the windows located under the eave. The falcon doors and corners are Renaissance and the windows of the second floor are classic. The balustrade that crowns the towers is in the style of El Escorial.

=== The Early Building (1422–1480) ===
In 1418 the deputies of the Generalitat decided to look for a fixed place to hold their periodic meetings. In 1421 they rented two rooms of a house in the current Carrer dels Cavallers from the notary Jaume Desplà^{in ES} to use them as meeting rooms and notary. The chosen place was favorable because it is quite central, very close to the old Casa de la Ciutat and the Cathedral, headquarters of temporal and spiritual power, respectively.

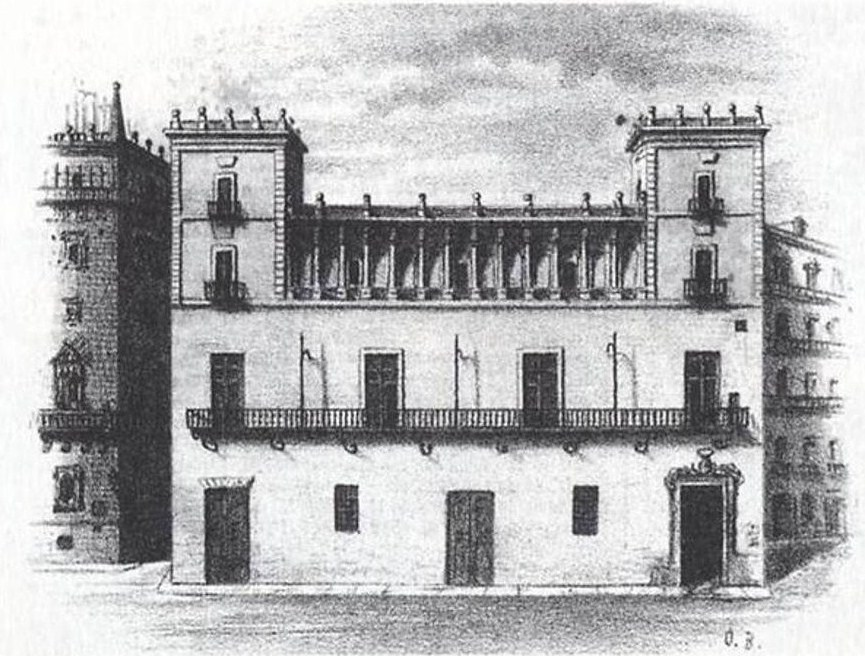
Façade of the Casa de la Ciudad published in "El Mundo Literario" (1865)

The following year, in 1422, the entire house would be purchased. The building had very modest dimensions, with the aforementioned meeting and notary rooms, in addition to a study on the stable.

At this time, different works of adaptation and beautification are carried out that have not survived. In 1450 a smaller door that existed next to the main one on Carrer dels Cavallers was blinded and in 1456 the rear façade was renovated, opening onto the current Plaça de Manises, with a large door and two windows. A few years later, in 1476, a porch was built on the flat roof with an overhang similar to that of the nearby Casa de la Ciutat.

=== First Major Building (1481–1511) ===
In 1481, the house adjacent to the headquarters of the Generalitat was put up for sale and the deputies acquired it in order to expand the building. The renovation works were carried out by the "obrer de vila" Francesc Martínez "Biulaygua", who also worked on the earlier building. In addition, masonry work was carried out by Pere Comte and Joan Yvarra, who at the same time were contracted to build La Lonja de la Seda.

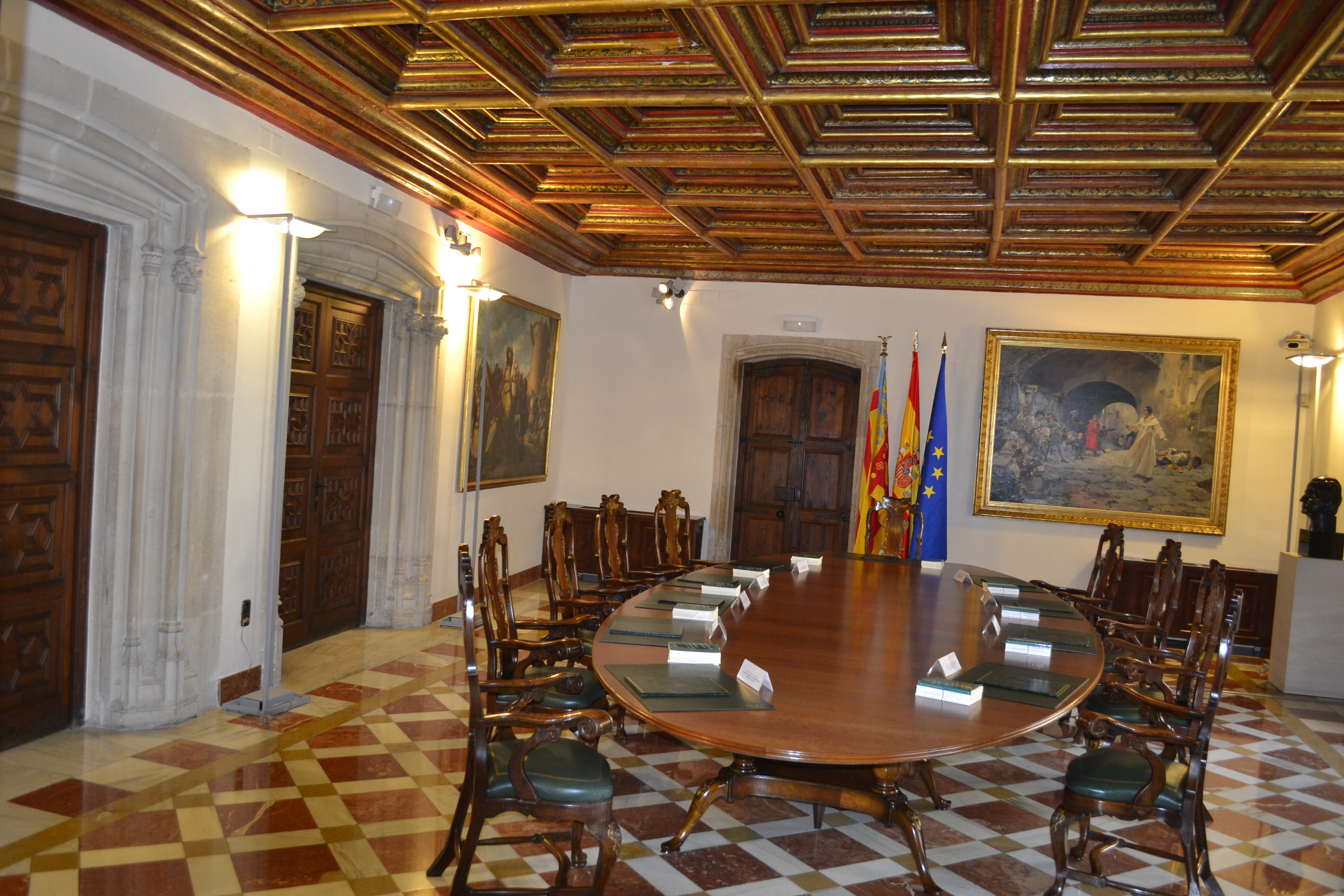
The purpose of the building has always been for meetings of the community leadership.

Their work included a stone staircase, now lost, and the exterior façades of the building. The new organization of the building began with the entrance on Carrer dels Cavallers into a courtyard with stables on the left and storage on the right. Above the stables was the Clerk's Office on a mezzanine, which was accessed from a ladder, and next to that the Archive. On the main floor were the meeting room and a hall, which was accessed by the stone staircase. Next to the meeting room was a chapel with a square plan and covered with a vault of nine keys, similar to that of the Lonja, whose only window overlooked a narrow alley. The altarpiece would be built in 1483 by the painter Pere Cabanes.

In 1494 the experienced stonemason Joan Corbera was hired to design and build the stone roof of the Clerk's Office and, in 1504 he roofed the Archive with mixed arches of a Castilian style. He also created the shields of the room looking out over Carrer dels Cavallers. Regarding the master masons of this first stage, it is worth mentioning, in addition to Francesc Martínez, Miquel Ruvio, who was replaced in 1502 by Joan Mançano. Also important is the work of the painters Simón de Gurrea and García de Carcastillo, who decorated the ceiling of the archive with "vulgarment dites del romà" figures.

=== The Great Renovation (1511–1515) ===
The internal layout of the primitive building, which adapted the rooms of the old houses, would change completely from 1511 onwards. These works would be carried out by the master masons Joan Corbera and Joan Mançano, and carpenters Alegret and Joan de Bas.

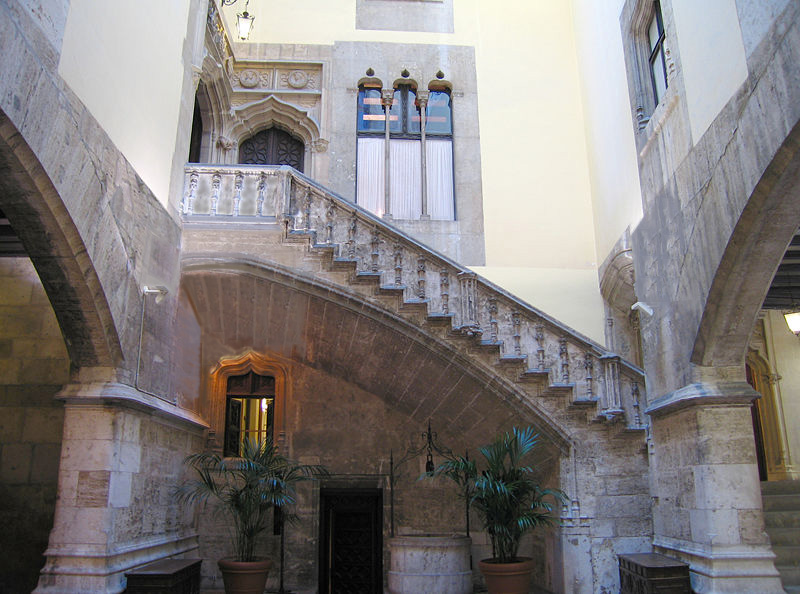
A view of the main interior courtyard of the Palace of the Generalitat Valenciana.

The work consisted of dismantling the old and heterogeneous courtyard, the result of joining the free spaces of two houses, in order to make room for the current courtyard. The five stone arches and the staircase made by Pere Compte were dismantled and later sold. In their place were built the two wide arches and the staircase still extant today. It was also planned to extend the door onto the Plaça de Manises to give it a width equal to that of the door onto Carrer dels Cavallers. New windows would also be opened and new rooms would be built, of which a good part is preserved. The great hall and the chapel were built on Carrer dels Cavallers, while the Plaça de Manises had three rooms on the main floor, plus other smaller ones in the studios and ground floor. The coffered ceiling of the Sala Dorada was begun by Joan Bas and finished, after his death, by Jordi Llobet. Joan Corbera designed the two ceilings of these rooms, leaving the sculptural work in charge of Jaume Vicent. The chapel, which is now lost, was in line with Renaissance architecture, with the sculptor Lluís Monyós working on the decoration from 1514 onwards.

=== Work on the Tower and other interventions (1516–1600) ===
At the end of 1513 another building was put up for sale located between the Palace of the Generalitat and the alley that separated the Casa de la Ciutat. A few years later another adjoining house was acquired, which completed the space now occupied by the tower. The works are begun by Joan Corbera and Joan Mançano, with the collaboration of sculptors such as Jordi Llobet and Lluís Monyós, and gilders such as Pere Bustamant and Martí Eiximenis. The ground floor and the two mezzanine studios, later known as the Sala Daurada and the Sala Daurada Menuda were built and the ceilings installed before 1520.

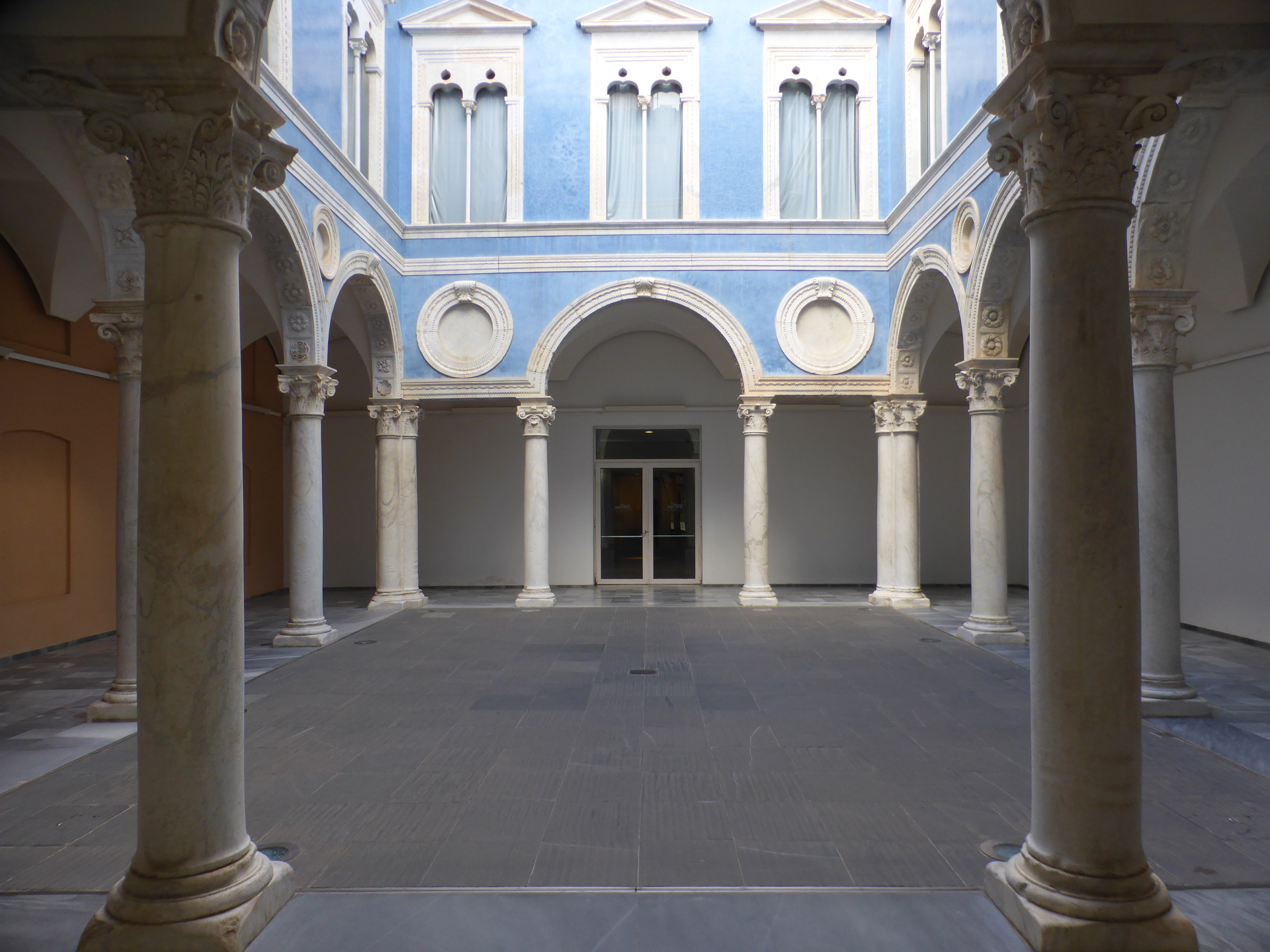
The Patio of Ambassador Vich at the Museu de Belles Arts de València

The Revolt of the Brotherhoods (1519–1523) marked a period of inactivity in the works, which would not resume until 1533. At this time the priest and master builder Monsignor Joan Baptista Corbera, son of Joan Corbera, took charge of the works. The masonry works will be carried out by Joan Navarro, also making the decoration of the coffered ceilings of the two rooms, carving was directed by the Oriolano carpenter Genís Llinares.

Over these two rooms the Sala Nova was built, for which Monsignor Corbera would make seven windows in 1538 framed by a perimeter molding and topped by pediments, similar to those of the courtyard of the Palace of Ambassador Vich.^{in ES} On top of these seven smaller windows would be built, square in shape and with a fully Renaissance decoration that is influenced by Serlio's Treatise on Architecture.

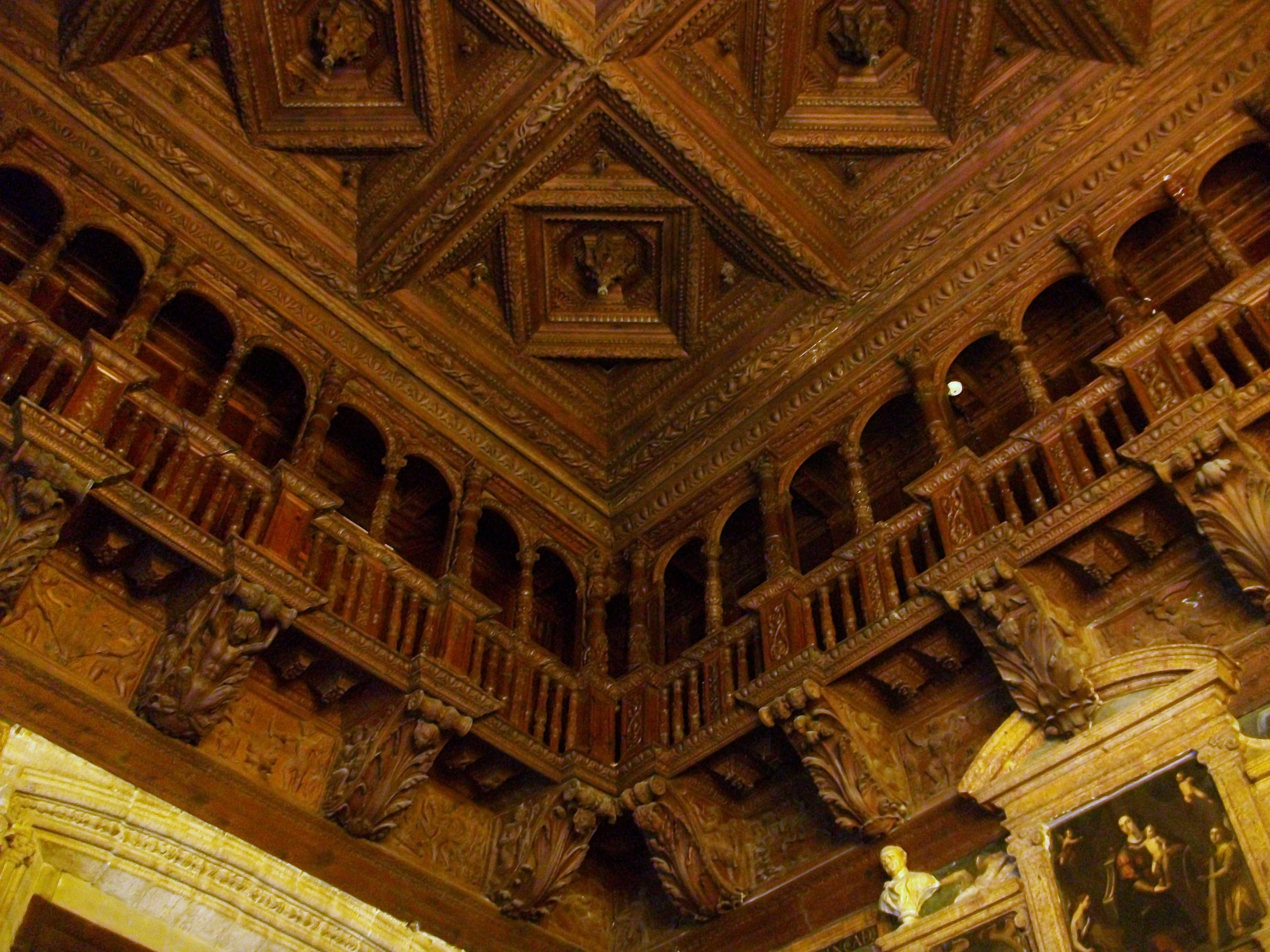
The gallery of the Sala Nova

At the end of 1540, Genís Llinares was commissioned to create the roof of this large hall, with a corridor or perimeter gallery that evokes the Throne Room of the Palace of the Catholic Monarchs in the Aljafería of Zaragoza. The prominent presence of columns in the shape of a chandelier betrays the influence of Diego de Sagredo's^{in ES} treatise, published in 1526, as well as the sculptural tradition of the early Castilian Renaissance. Upon the death of Llinares in 1543, it would be his sons, Pere and Martí Llinares Blasco, who would be in charge of continuing the work, finishing it, between 1562 and 1565, the carpenter and sculptor Gaspar Gregori. The members of the Llinares family and Gregori are credited with the rich carved decoration and the wooden panels with scenes that are distributed throughout the ceiling. Joan Vergara was in charge of the work to build a porch and a flat roof with a parapet over the Sala Nova, which would be dismantled a few years later.

In 1568 the important plinths and pavement were tiled with ceramics from Manises, made by Joan Elies according to designs by "Joannes lo pintor", probably Juan de Juanes. In 1572 the Deputies hired the master Hernando de Santiago who had recently arrived in the city and was aware of the new models that were being introduced in the tile factories of Seville. After 1575 it would be Juan de Villalba, from Talavera, who continued the ceramic decoration for the building.

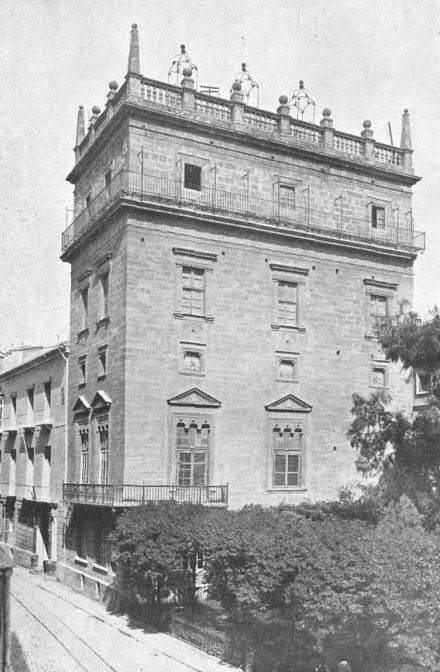
Palau de la Generalitat Valenciana in 1911 before the second tower was built

In 1574 the master carpenter Gaspar Gregori "architector" was put in charge of directing and managing the works that were being carried out in the building. Gregori designed the traces and the molds with the technical advice of the stonemason Miquel Porcar, who would materially execute the work with his crew. The top of the tower, with a distinctly Renaissance character, is inspired by the plates of Serlio's treatise and features a new body of square windows, cornice, attic and classical balustrade topped with balls and pinnacles. A perimeter iron balcony was also added over the cornice under the attic, made by Joan Armaholea and Josep Monseu, as well as another much more elaborate one, executed by Baptista Cerdà, for the "Sala Nova" on the corner of Carrer dels Cavallers.

A few years later, the sculptors Joan Marià and Baptista April made the façade that connected the chapel and Sala Nova (1590), following the designs provided in 1584 by Pere de Gorssari, although they introduced some modifications based on Vignola's treatise on the side facing the Sala Nova.

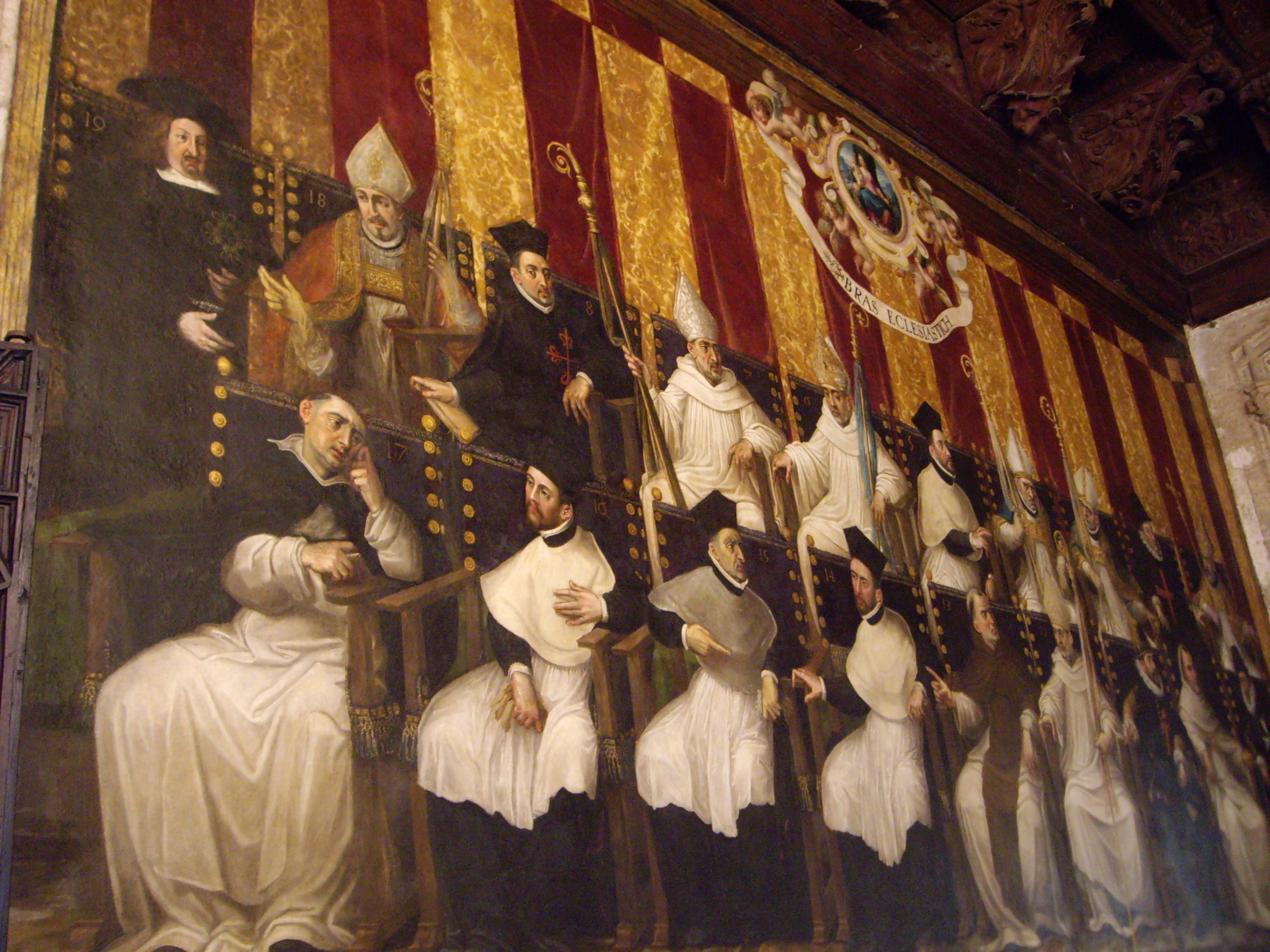
The representatives of the civic estate as Royal Cities and towns

In 1591, after submitting it to consultation among the most outstanding painters of the kingdom, it was decided to decorate the walls of this room with paintings with the collective portraits of the deputies, painted al vivo, a task that would be carried out under the direction of Juan Sariñena(in ES). The work was planned to included the Deputies of the Generalitat which is called La Sitiada, the three estates (ecclesiastical, military, and civic), the representatives of the Royal cities and towns, and the nobles of the Royal Court. Given the magnitude of the work, other artists were called to collaborate. Among them were Vicente Mestre, Luis Mata, Sebastián Zaidía, Vicente Requena the Younger who was in charge of the ecclesiastical Estate on a design by Sariñena, and the Italian Francisco Pozzo, who worked on the Military Branch, with Juan Sariñena reserving to himself La Sitiada and the nobles of the Royal Court. These paintings would suffer multiple restorations over the centuries due to humidity problems and deterioration. A few years later a painting of the Virgin was commissioned, which was completed by the painter Bernadí Çamora in 1638, framed by Josep Pedrós. The door of the Hall would be made by Gregori in 1593.

=== The Final Epoch (1600–1700) ===
At the beginning of the 17th century, a new altarpiece was made for the chapel, replacing the original by Pere Cabanes. The author of the paintings was again Juan de Sariñena, while the sculpture of the frame was the work of the carpenter Jaume Fontestat. Minor maintenance and conditioning works were also carried out such as the work to convert the Sala Daurada and Sala Daurada Menuda for use as a knights's prison in 1611.

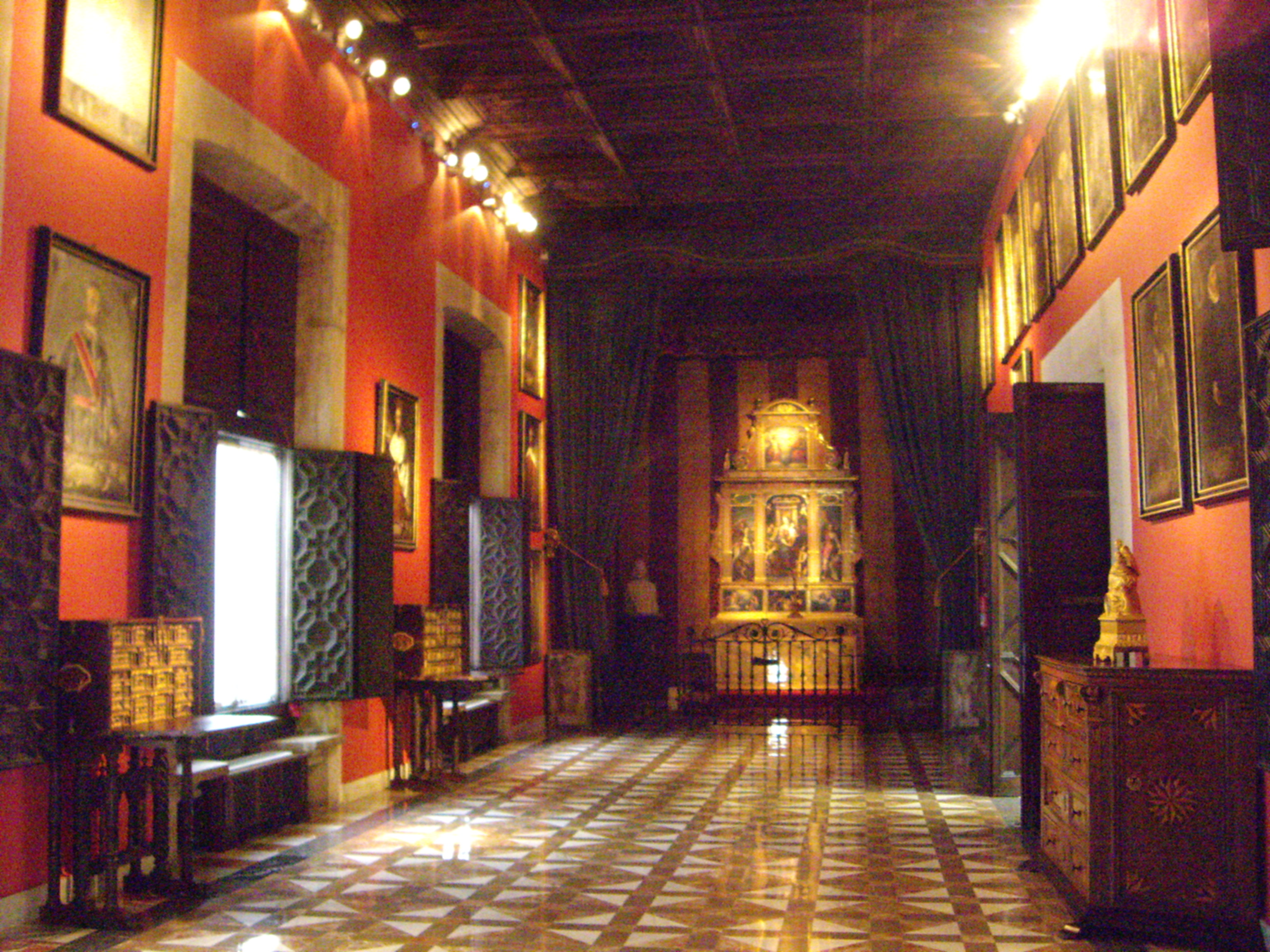
A view down the Sala de Reis toward the chapel of the palace.

In 1655 a sacristy for the chapel was built, taking advantage of part of the kitchen of the Clerk's Office, as well as a large gate and new doors for the Sala Nova made by the carpenter Joan Cassanya from drawings by Llorenç Pareja and Gregori German. Finally, in 1656 a new façade was built on the side facing Carrer dels Cavallers according to the design of the painter Jerónimo Jacinto Espinosa, inspired by the sacristy of the Real Colegio Seminario del Corpus Christi. The stonemasons Josep Escrivá and Esteve Girardo would be in charge of the work, using black stone from the Alcublas, white marble from Valldigna and stone from Ribarroja. New wooden sheets were also made for the doors and the corner balcony was enlarged. In 1690 the Gothic portal of the Plaça de Manises was replaced with one similar to that on Carrer dels Cavallers.

In 1718 the abolition of the institution of the Generalitat Valenciana occurs and in 1750 the Real Audiencia was moved to the Palace of the Generalitat Valenciana and for this reason a renovation is carried out to adapt it to use, the master of works was Vicente Clemente. The reform consisted mainly of compartmentalizing the rooms of the main floor, including the Sala Nova and building a balcony or gallery for the chapel facing the courtyard.

=== Other Works ===
In 1830 the architect hired by the Court, Franco Calatayud, reports that a part of the building is in a dilapidated state and the danger of collapse is imminent. Among the works that were carried out are:

- Lowering the porches on the top floor.
- New compartmentalizations are made to partition the various rooms.
- A staircase is formed between the mezzanine and the anteroom of the Salas del Crimen y Civiles.
- The main façade is plastered and balconies are installed.
- Staircase to go up to the top floor.
- On the main floor anteroom of the Chapel, there are three large iron balconies and four doors with new windows.
- On the second floor that faces Carrer dels Cavallers, four balconies must be placed and on the part of the Plaça de Manises three balconies. In the courtyard, two iron parapets with two window doors.

In 1871 the president of the Real Audiencia asked the Provincial Council or La Diputación for its cooperation in the repair and restoration of the Sala Nova, and it is not known if this work was carried out. From this date on, maintenance and repair works were carried out under the direction of provincial architects. Among the works that were carried out later are the following:

- In the 1910s, the Real Audencia prepared to move to La Antigua Aduana,^{in ES} and La Diputación, located in the Palace of the Temple,^{in ES} moved to the Palace of the Generalitat Valenciana. From this moment on, the architect Vicente Rodríguez Martín is in charge of the works, which consisted of recovering the original building, eliminating some of the transformations carried out in previous stages, and consolidating the structure of the building.
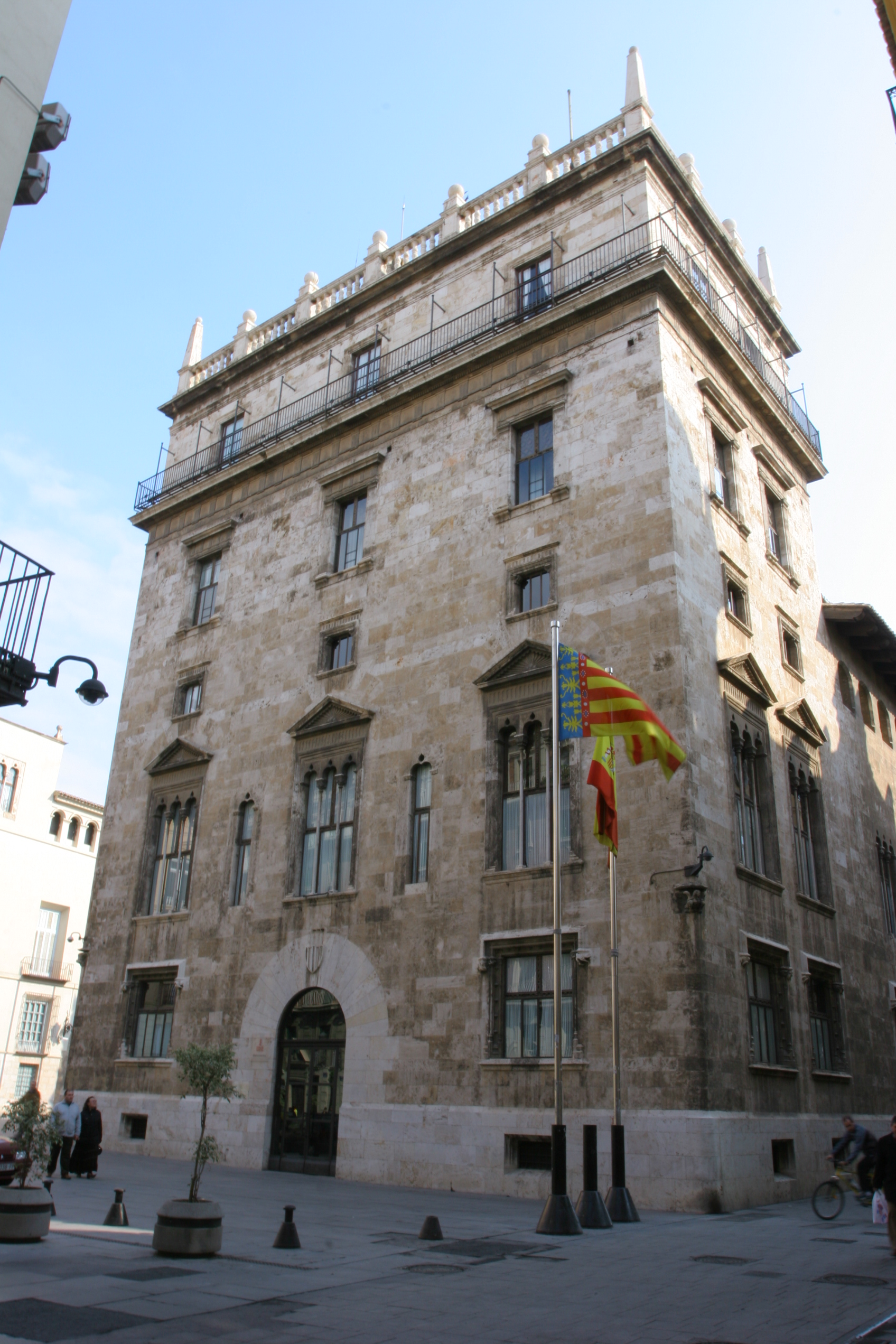
  View of the new tower and formal entrance to the government offices.
- In 1941, the preliminary project for the restoration and extension of the Palace was drawn up by the architect of the Provincial Council, Luis Albert Ballesteros.^{in ES} The works, which lasted from 1942 to 1953, involved the extension of the central body and the creation of a new tower that finishes off the west side of the building. A new access is created into the Plaça de Manises. The architectural elements of the extension were designed to be consistent in style with the older parts of the building: stone stairs, carved stone doorways, wooden carpentry, coffered ceilings, non-structural alfarjes, stone cladding, and wood panelling on the walls.
- Beginning in 1982, when the building became the headquarters of the Presidency of the Generalitat Valenciana, the architect Alberto Peñín carried out the project to refurbish the building for the new government. The work of this period that changed the exterior of the building involved covering the two courtyards, the creation of emergency and passage stairs, and the installation of a new lift. In the remaining years of the twentieth century and the beginning of the twenty-first century, various rehabilitation and restoration interventions of the building were carried out.

== Rooms and Structures ==
The building today consists of two towers at either end and a central body. It is distributed as a Mediterranean Gothic palace with an open courtyard, a grand staircase, a semi-basement, and three floors: mezzanine, main floor and gallery.

=== Central body (1481–1541) ===
Built in late Gothic style by Pere Comte and Joan Guivarró, the oldest part is the doorway of Carrer de Cavallers (1481), and the most modern, but still Gothic, are the arches of the upper gallery (1541).

The façade facing Carrer de Cavallers presents:

- access door with semicircular voussoir, which leads to the courtyard;
- mezzanine, with six rectangular moulded windows;
- main floor, with six three-lobed Gothic windows with fine columns;
- gallery, with sixteen windows below the wooden eaves;
- gabled roof, in contrast to the four of the primitive tower.

The façade facing Plaça de Manises has:

- access door with voussoir, in line with the previous one, which also leads to the courtyard;
- mezzanine, with seven rectangular moulded windows;
- main floor, with eight three-lobed Gothic windows with fine columns;
- gallery, with twenty-three windows below the wooden eaves.

In the open courtyard, the grand staircase was built by Joan Corbera in 1551. This example of Flamboyant Gothic is made up of two sections at right angles joined by a landing. In the same courtyard, there is a bronze chimney by Mario Benlliure (1899) and a sculpture of a crossbowman from the Centenary of the Feather, by Salvador Furió.

From the courtyard, there is access by a smaller staircase to the old tower, and by the grand staircase to the main floor, on the access landing to which there is a double door forming an angle of 90°, on which the old emblem of the Generalitat can be seen on an arch and on another two chiseled busts facing each other, possibly of Ferdinand the Catholic and his second wife, Germaine of Foix.

=== Ancient Tower (1518–1585) ===
A large tower was erected together with the body of the central building, which overlooks the Plaça de la Verge, designed by the master Montano and executed with great difficulty, since the works were suspended for various reasons and were changed from the original plans. This long process influenced the diversity of styles in the construction, because it was begun in the Gothic style, continued in the Renaissance style and finished in Herrerian style.

The tower consists of five floors. The first three are the work of Joan Corbera, who also participated in the works of the Pavilion of the Consulate of the Silk Exchange, and the last two floors by Gaspar Gregori. The windows of the mezzanine follow the same scheme as those of the central body. On the main floor, the Gothic arches are topped by the addition of the Renaissance triangular pediment. The squared balcony was built so that the authorities could view the Corpus Christi procession. The top of the tower, in Herrerian style, is crowned by a cornice and stone balustrade completed with balls decorating the railing and pinnacles in the corners.

=== Modern Tower (1940–1952) ===
The twin tower, by Luis Albert Ballesteros, which overlooks the Plaça de Manises, is a copy of the older one. It is similar, but it does not have a balcony and the arrangement of windows is completely regular, unlike the old one.

Beginning in 1941, the Provincial Council of Valencia began to expropriate all the houses that were needed to build the new tower. For the construction of this second tower the same stone that had been used for the first tower was used in order to match aesthetically. In the new tower there is the current primary access door to the building, semicircular with voussoir and coat of arms with the bars of Aragon.

=== Sala Daurada and Sala Daurada Menuda (1517–1538) ===
The staircase to the right of the courtyard gives access to the old tower, where the Sala Daurada and Sala Daurada Menuda or Retret are located. The large one had the function of an extraordinary meeting room, and sometimes a prison for nobles, while the small one was a room for common or everyday meetings.

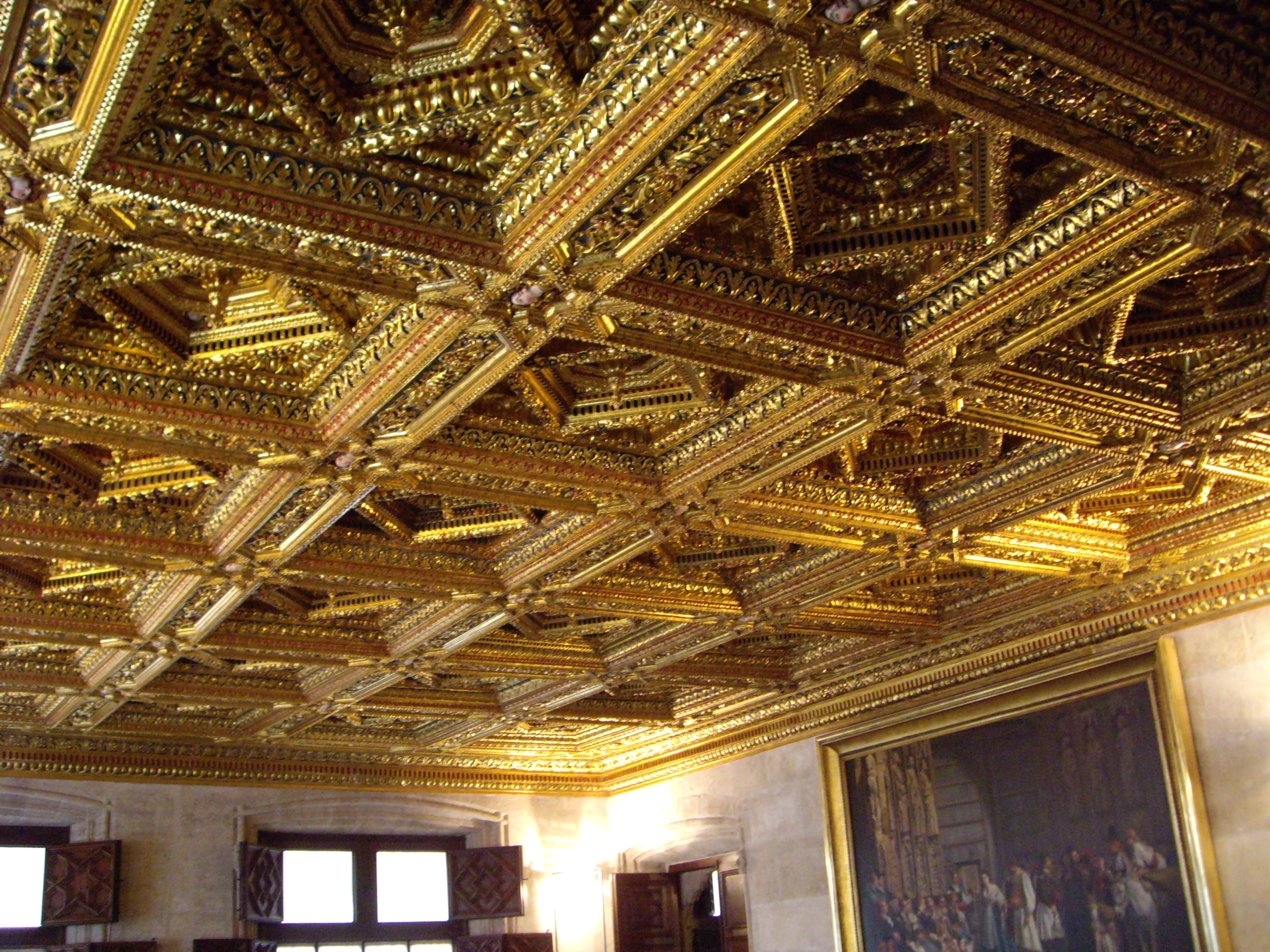
The ceiling of the Sala Daurada

The most characteristic of these is the golden ceiling from which they take their name. In the Sala Daurada, the gilded ceiling establishes a relationship of equality between Renaissance symmetry and Mudéjar taste. Each square section has another rhomboidal figure inside, which, in turn, includes an octagon with a central hanging floret. All this worked with the meticulous Mudejar cut, but also including characteristic Renaissance motifs such as acanthus leaves, busts, strawberries, thistles and denticles. This work, made by the master Genís Llinares in 1534, was finished with polychrome and gilded by Joan Cardona.

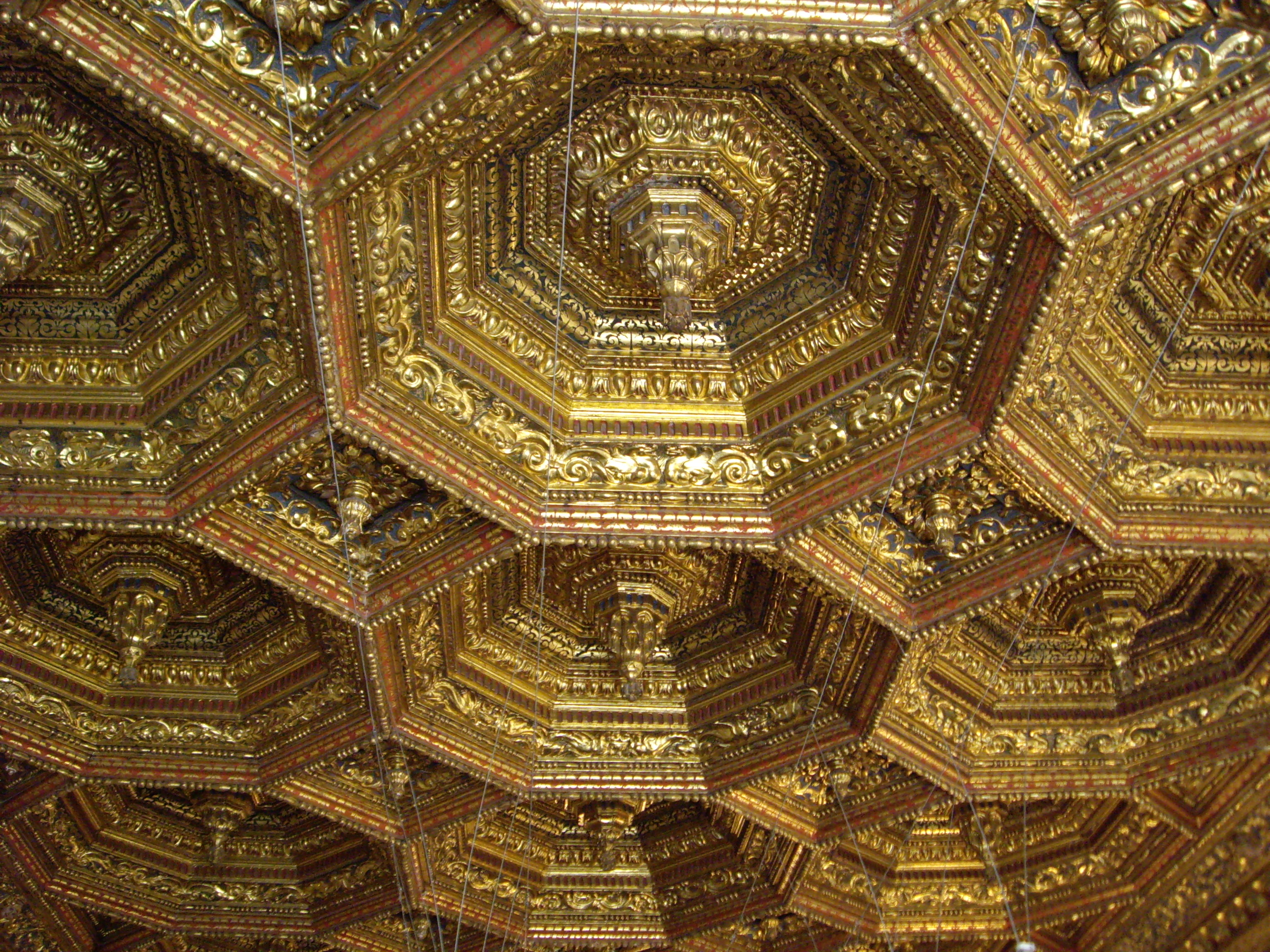
The ceiling of the Sala Daurada Menuda

In the ceiling of the Sala Daurada Menuda, there is a change in the geometric distribution, since the coffers are made up of symmetrical octagons that give the appearance of triangular and square figures, adorned with plant scrolls, denticles, hanging florets and a wide variety of medallions with human heads and dragons. The depth and complication in the coffered ceilings of the small room is greater, compared to of the large one. It is also the work of Genís Llinares and his son Pere Llinares Blasco, who would conclude it on the death of his father.

=== Sala Vella (1481–1494) ===
The Sala Vella has had various uses, and currently the plenary sessions of the Council of the Generalitat Valenciana are held there. It stands out for the polychrome decoration of its ceiling by the master cabinetmaker Antoni Peris Alterol, and for the crushed stone doorway attributed to Pere Comte, which serves as access from the Gothic courtyard.

=== Escrivania (1565–1585) ===
In 1565, it was decided to use as a clerk’s office, due to lack of space, the room located above the Sala Nova and which was still unused. This room was accessed by the spiral staircase (located next to the entrance to the Sala Nova). The cabinet of the clerk’s office is an important example of Valencian cabinetmaking and the work of Gaspar Gregori. The work was completed in 1585.

=== Sala de Reis (1511–1592) ===
On the main floor, we find the Sala of Honor, which is accessed from the front door of the courtyard, and where in the past special swearing-in meetings were held that required special protocols. Crossing the mixtilini arch on the left, you enter one of the most important rooms of the palace: the Hall of Kings, which takes its name from the series of mostly imagined portraits begun in the seventeenth century by Pau Pontons of the kings who ruled the Kingdom of Valencia from James I to Alfonso XIII. The room stands on the beamed bay of the lobby and overlooks Carrer dels Cavallers through its four windows divided by thin columns. The construction of the room, begun in 1511, is the work of Joan Mançano. The original ceiling disappeared in the nineteenth century and was replaced by the current one. Today it is used for Council receptions.

One end of the hall was reserved for the chapel, a common element in noble houses. The chapel is separated from the rest of the room by an iron grille and curtains. The primitive chapel consisted of an altar begun in 1514. This was originally decorated with the emblem of the Generalitat (Saint George, the Virgin Mary and the Guardian Angel), plus figures of prophets and seraphim, and it is an example of the early Renaissance in Valencia. At the beginning of the seventeenth century it was auctioned and a new altarpiece was commissioned. This is the work of Joan Sarinyena in terms of painting, and the structure was carved by Jaume de Fontestad. It is made up of three bodies: the central part is occupied by the Virgin enthroned with the child, flanked on the left by Saint George slaying the dragon, and on the right by the Guardian Angel, who wields the symbols of the Crown. In the predella, scenes from the life of Mary are represented: from left to right, the Annunciation, the Adoration of the Shepherds and the apparition of Saint Bernard. In the top, there is a representation of the Trinity.

Other rooms on this floor are the Sala del Fumeral and the Sala de Calixto III.

=== Sala de Corts or Sala de Nova (1540–1593) ===
The Sala Nova owes its name, erroneously, to a mistaken interpretation of the paintings in which elected deputies of the Generalitat appear. It was assumed that these representatives of the kingdom met here between convocations of the Corts, but no session of the Sort with the presence of the king ever took place in this room.

The deputies, in addition to expanding the building with a new room, intended to turn it into the meeting room for their sessions, so they commissioned the master Genís Llinares, and after his death, his son Pere Martí Llinares, and finally, the carpenter and architect Gaspar Gregori completed the work in 1566. This ceiling is inspired by the Throne Room of the Aljafería Palace in Zaragoza.

Genís Llinares prepared twenty-one coffers with the same structure as those in the Sala Daurada, but without polychrome in gold.The gallery that serves as a support for the ceiling goes around the entire room. It stands on solid corbels, individually adorned with human, vegetable and mythological motifs. The central point on each of the sides of the room is reserved for the emblem of the Generalitat.

The plinth is made of tiles from Manises and Paterna (1568–1576), following the guidelines set by the ceramics of Seville and Talavera, with ornamental motifs of white, blue, yellow and soft ochres.

The paintings in the room depict a session of the Court, with the assistance of representatives of the three estates (military, ecclesiastical, civic). In 1591, the deputies commissioned the work to several painters.

Joan Sarinyena painted six deputies on the wall of the Carrer de Bailía, two from each estate, assisted by the institution's officers, on a four-barred tapestry with the coats of arms of the Generalitat. Vicent Requena painted the ecclesiastical estate to the right of the Sarinyena canvas. Each one seated with the clothes proper to his station under a Virgin Mary with the child supported by angels from which falls the phylactery (Speech_scroll) that calls the ecclesiastical branch of the court on a four-barred background. On the wall of the gardens of the Generalitat, the Italian Francesco Pozzo painted the numerous representatives of the military establishment, placed in four rows to increase their depth. Like the other paintings, he maintains the four-barred background and places in the upper centre Saint George with the military branch phylactery. The phylactery with the civic branch of the royal cities and towns of the Kingdom was painted by Vicent Mestre, with the corresponding symbol of the Guardian Angel, and the thirteen representatives of the royal towns of the kingdom, namely: Xàtiva, Orihuela, Alicante, Morella, Alzira, Castellón, Villarreal, Ontinyent, Alcoy, Onda, Carcaixent, Callosa and Guardamar.

== Bibliography ==
- "Los tesoros del Palau de la Generalitat Valenciana". La Vanguardia (in Spanish). 2021-12-26.
- JOSE ALCARAZ (2022-10-06). ESPECTACULAR PALACIO!!🇪🇦. Visitamos el Palacio de la Generalitat valenciana. Asombroso!! – via YouTube.
- Salvador Aldana (1995). El Palau de la Generalitat Valenciana. València: Generalitat Valenciana, Consell Valencià de Cultura. ISBN 84-482-0983-4.
- Martínez Aloy, J. (1909). La Casa de la Diputación. València.
- Martínez Aloy, J. (1920). La Casa de la Generalitat del Regne de València. València.
- Martínez Aloy, J. (1930). La Diputación de la Generalidad del Reino de Valencia. València.
- Martínez Ferrando, E. (1920). La Casa de la Generalitat del Regne de València. València.
