= Sorrenti =

Sorrenti is a surname. Notable people with this surname include:

- Alan Sorrenti (born 1964), Italian singer and composer
- Clara Sorrenti, aka Keffals (born 1994), Canadian Twitch streamer
- Davide Sorrenti (1976–1997), Italian fashion photographer
- Mario Sorrenti (born 1971), Italian-American photographer and director
- Rob Sorrenti (born 1980), British director, writer, and producer
- Vince Sorrenti (born 1961), Australian comedian

== See also ==
- Sorrentino
