= McGehee transformation =

Mathematical transformation for analysing collisions

The McGehee transformation was introduced by Richard McGehee to study the triple collision singularity in the n-body problem.

The transformation blows up the single point in phase space where the collision occurs into a collision manifold, the phase space point is cut out and in its place a smooth manifold is pasted. This allows the phase space singularity to be studied in detail.

What McGehee found was a distorted sphere with four horns pulled out to infinity and the points at their tips deleted. McGehee then went on to study the flow on the collision manifold.
