= María Cumplido =

Spanish mathematician (born 1992)

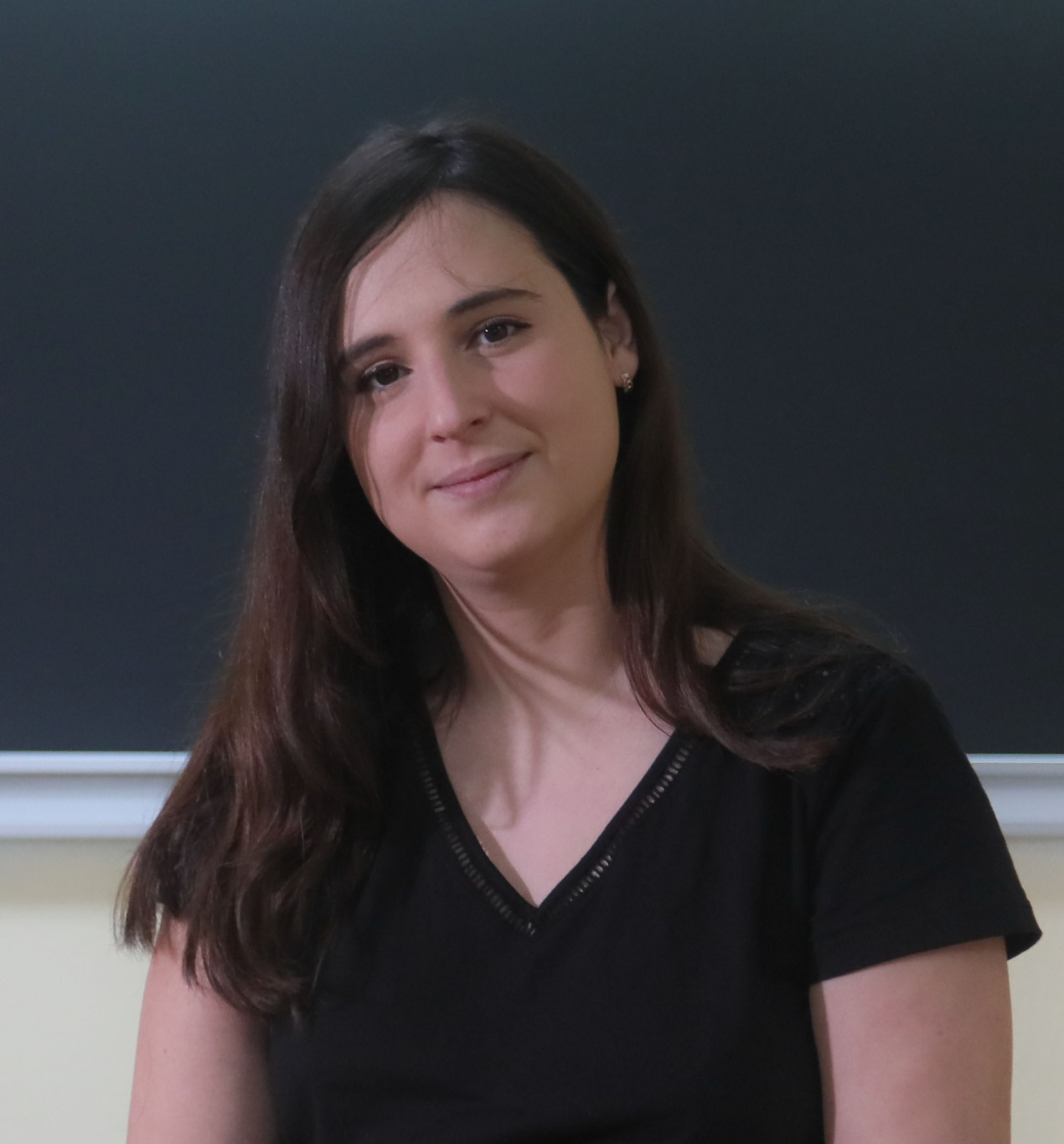
- Born: María Cumplido Cabello; 25 April 1992 (age 34); Córdoba, España
- Education: University of Seville
- Occupations: Mathematician, researcher
- Awards: Vicent Caselles Mathematical Research Prize (2020)

María Cumplido Cabello (25 April 1992) is a Spanish mathematician and researcher who in 2020 was awarded the Vicent Caselles Mathematical Research Prize of the Royal Spanish Mathematical Society.

== Career ==
Cumplido was born in the Santa Rosa-Valdeolleros neighborhood of Córdoba, Spain. She graduated in Mathematics from the University of Seville and spent a year at the Pierre and Marie Curie University in Paris.

She obtained a master's degree in Advanced Mathematics at the University of Seville and a Collaboration Scholarship from the Ministry of Education in the Department of Algebra. He also received a scholarship from the Ministry of Education in the Department of Algebra and was awarded a scholarship to study mathematics at the University of Seville, where she studied for a year.

She received her PhD from the University of Seville and from the University of Rennes. She was recognized for her thesis. Cumplido was a postdoctoral researcher at the University of Burgundy in Dijon and spent a month research stay in Oaxaca, Mexico. In October 2019 she became a postdoctoral researcher at Heriot-Watt University in Edinburgh. She has also worked at the Complutense University of Madrid and is currently a postdoctoral researcher at the University of Seville.

She has focused her research in the field of geometric group theory and has succeeded in generalizing geometric and topological results on braid groups to the algebraic context of Artin-Tits groups of spherical type, thus solving a mathematical problem that had been unsolved for 20 years. This field of research is potentially applicable in cryptography and computer security.

== Awards ==
In 2018 she won the second prize of the Rennes 1 Foundation for the best thesis in Mathematics and Science and Information and Communication Technologies.

In 2020 she was one of six young mathematicians to receive the Vicent Caselles Mathematical Research Award of the Spanish Royal Mathematical Society and the BBVA Foundation.
