= Richard McGehee =

American mathematician

- Born: Richard Paul McGehee; 20 September 1943 (age 82); San Diego, California, U.S.
- Education: California Institute of Technology (B.Sc., 1964); University of Wisconsin–Madison (M.Sc., 1965; Ph.D., 1969)
- Known for: McGehee transformation
- Scientific career
- Fields: Mathematics, Dynamical systems, Celestial mechanics
- Workplaces: University of Minnesota
- Thesis: Homoclinic orbits in the restricted three body problem (1969)
- Doctoral advisor: Charles C. Conley
- Website: University profile

Richard Paul McGehee (born 20 September 1943 in San Diego) is an American mathematician, who works on dynamical systems with special emphasis on celestial mechanics.

McGehee received from Caltech in 1964 his bachelor's degree and from University of Wisconsin–Madison in 1965 his master's degree and in 1969 his Ph.D. under Charles C. Conley with thesis Homoclinic orbits in the restricted three body problem. As a postdoc he was at the Courant Institute of Mathematical Sciences of New York University. In 1970, he became an assistant professor and in 1979 a full professor at the University of Minnesota in Minneapolis, where he was from 1994 to 1998 the director of the Center for the Computation and Visualization of Geometric Structures. He has been at the University of Minnesota since 1970.

In the 1970s, he introduced a coordinate transformation (now known as the McGehee transformation) which he used to regularize singularities arising in the Newtonian three-body problem. In 1975, he, with John N. Mather, proved that for the Newtonian collinear four-body problem there exist solutions which become unbounded in a finite time interval.

In 1978, he was an Invited Speaker on the subject of Singularities in classical celestial mechanics at the International Congress of Mathematicians in Helsinki.

== See also ==
- McGehee transformation

== Selected publications ==
- McGehee, Richard (1973). "A stable manifold theorem for degenerate fixed points with applications to celestial mechanics". Journal of Differential Equations. 14 (1): 70–88. Bibcode:1973JDE....14...70M. doi:10.1016/0022-0396(73)90077-6.
- McGehee, Richard (1974). "Triple collision in the collinear three body problem". Inventiones Mathematicae. 27 (3): 191–227. Bibcode:1974InMat..27..191M. doi:10.1007/bf01390175. S2CID 121981420.
- with Robert A. Armstrong: McGehee, Richard; Armstrong, Robert A. (1977). "Some mathematical problems concerning the ecological principle of competitive exclusion". Journal of Differential Equations. 23 (1): 30–52. Bibcode:1977JDE....23...30M. doi:10.1016/0022-0396(77)90135-8.
- McGehee, Richard (1981). "Double collisions for a classical particle system with nongravitational interactions". Comment. Math. Helv. 56 (1): 524–557. doi:10.1007/BF02566226. S2CID 122599392.
- "Von Zeipel´s Theorem on singularities in celestial mechanics". Expositiones Mathematicae. 4: 335–345. 1986.
- McGehee, Richard (1992). "Attractors for closed relations on compact Hausdorff spaces" (PDF). Indiana University Mathematics Journal. 41 (4): 1165–1209. doi:10.1512/iumj.1992.41.41058.
- as editor with Kenneth R. Meyer: Twist mappings and their applications. Springer Verlag. 1992.
