= Dario Sorrentino =

Italian medical researcher (1957–2021)

- Born: Dario Rosario Sorrentino; 25 July 1957; Alghero, Italy
- Died: 4 August 2021 (aged 64); Alghero, Italy
- Education: University of California, San Francisco
- Alma mater: University of Sassari (MD)
- Scientific career
- Fields: Medicine, Gastroenterology, Digestive Endoscopy
- Workplaces: Mount Sinai Medical School (1986–1992); University of Udine (1993–2010); University of Queensland (2010–2013); Virginia Tech Carilion School of Medicine (2013–2021)

Dario Rosario Sorrentino (25 July 1957 – 4 August 2021) was an Italian medical researcher.

In 2021, Sorrentino was Professor of Medicine and Director of the Inflammatory Bowel Diseases (IBD) Center at Virginia Tech Carilion School of Medicine and had held a Faculty position at the University of Udine Medical School in Italy.

== Early life and education ==
Dario Rosario Sorrentino was born on 25 July 1957 in Alghero, Sassari, Italy, son of Antonio and Rosa (née Messina) Sorrentino. He graduated from high school at Liceo Scientifico, Alghero in 1976. He earned his Medical Degree at University of Sassari in Italy in 1982. During his training he spent time as a research fellow at the GI/Liver Unit of the University of California, San Francisco. He specialized in gastroenterology in 1987 in Italy.

== Career ==
Sorrentino was visiting scientist at King's College Hospital, London, 1978, and Royal Free Hospital, London from 1979 to 1980. He was Research fellow at University of California, San Francisco from 1983 to 1986.

=== Academic career ===
Sorrentino was appointed assistant professor at Mount Sinai Medical School, New York City - Divisions of GI and Liver Disease from July 1986 to December 1992, and clinical fellow medicine, in 1992. During this time he conducted basic research studies in cellular membrane transport. He was assistant professor of medicine at University of Udine, Italy from 1993 to 1999 and was appointed associate professor of medicine in 1999.

==== Clinical trials ====
The Biologic Onset of Crohn's Disease: A Screening Study in First Degree Relatives.

== Death ==
On 4 August 2021, Sorrentino died in a road accident, hit along provincial road 51, in the Porto Conte Regional Natural Park, within the municipal area of Alghero, in Sardinia.

He was in Sardinia for his summer holiday, and he traveled the dirt road on a mountain bike in the Porto Conte Regional Natural Park, right in conjunction with the provincial road 51. Passing from dirt to asphalt, he lost his balance, fell on the asphalt, and suddenly was fatally hit by a bus.

== Publications ==
Sorrentino's research activity, which resulted in many scientific publications, concerned the field of medicine with particular attention to gastroenterology.
