= Eva Gallardo =

Spanish mathematician (born 1973)

Eva Antonia Gallardo-Gutiérrez (born 1973) is a Spanish mathematician specializing in operator theory. She is a professor of mathematics at the Complutense University of Madrid, deputy director of the Institute of Mathematical Sciences (Spain), and past-president of the Royal Spanish Mathematical Society from 2022 until 2025.

Gallardo completed her Ph.D. at the University of Seville in 2000. Her dissertation, Ciclicidad de operadores: Teoría espectral, was supervised by Alfonso Montes-Rodríguez. With Montes-Rodríguez, she is a coauthor of a research monograph, The Role of the Spectrum in the Cyclic Behavior of Composition Operators (American Mathematical Society, 2004).
