= Lorenzo Sorrentino =

Italian footballer

Personal information
- Date of birth: 20 September 1995 (age 31)
- Place of birth: Rome, Italy
- Height: 1.88 m (6 ft 2 in)
- Position: Forward

Team information
- Current team: Triestina

Senior career*
Years	Team	Apps	(Gls)
2012–2014	Astrea	30	(5)
2014–2015	San Cesareo	5	(0)
2015	Rieti	20	(6)
2015–2018	Sambenedettese	72	(17)
2018–2019	Stabia	12	(2)
2018–2019	→ Lucchese (loan)	35	(7)
2019–2020	Gubbio	13	(1)
2020–2021	Renate	19	(3)
2021	→ Cesena (loan)	15	(2)
2021–2022	Vibonese	16	(2)
2022	Fidelis Andria	13	(0)
2022–2023	Gelbison	13	(0)
2023–2024	Giugliano	30	(7)
2024	→ Fermana (loan)	15	(5)
2024–2025	Pianese	19	(1)
2025–2026	AlbinoLeffe	24	(1)
2026–	Triestina	0	(0)
- * Club domestic league appearances and goals as of 30 April 2026

Lorenzo Sorrentino (born 20 September 1995) is an Italian professional footballer who plays as a forward for Serie D club Triestina.

== Career ==
Born in Rome, Sorrentino started his career in Serie D clubs Astrea (2 seasons), San Cesareo, Rieti and Sambenedettese. With Sambenedettese won the promotion to Serie C for the 2016–17 season. The forward made his professional debut on 11 October 2016 against Calcio Padova.

On 10 January 2018, Sorrentino signed with Juve Stabia.

On 3 August 2018, he was loaned to Lucchese.

He left Gubbio on 1 June 2020, and signed with Renate.

In February 2021, he was loaned to Cesena.

After six months in Serie C club Vibonese, in January 2022 Sorrentino signed with Fidelis Andria.

On 5 January 2023, Sorrentino joined Giugliano. On 1 February 2024, he was loaned by Fermana.

On 3 August 2024, Sorrentino signed with Pianese.
