= Alfonso Sorrentino (mathematician) =

Italian mathematician (born 1979)

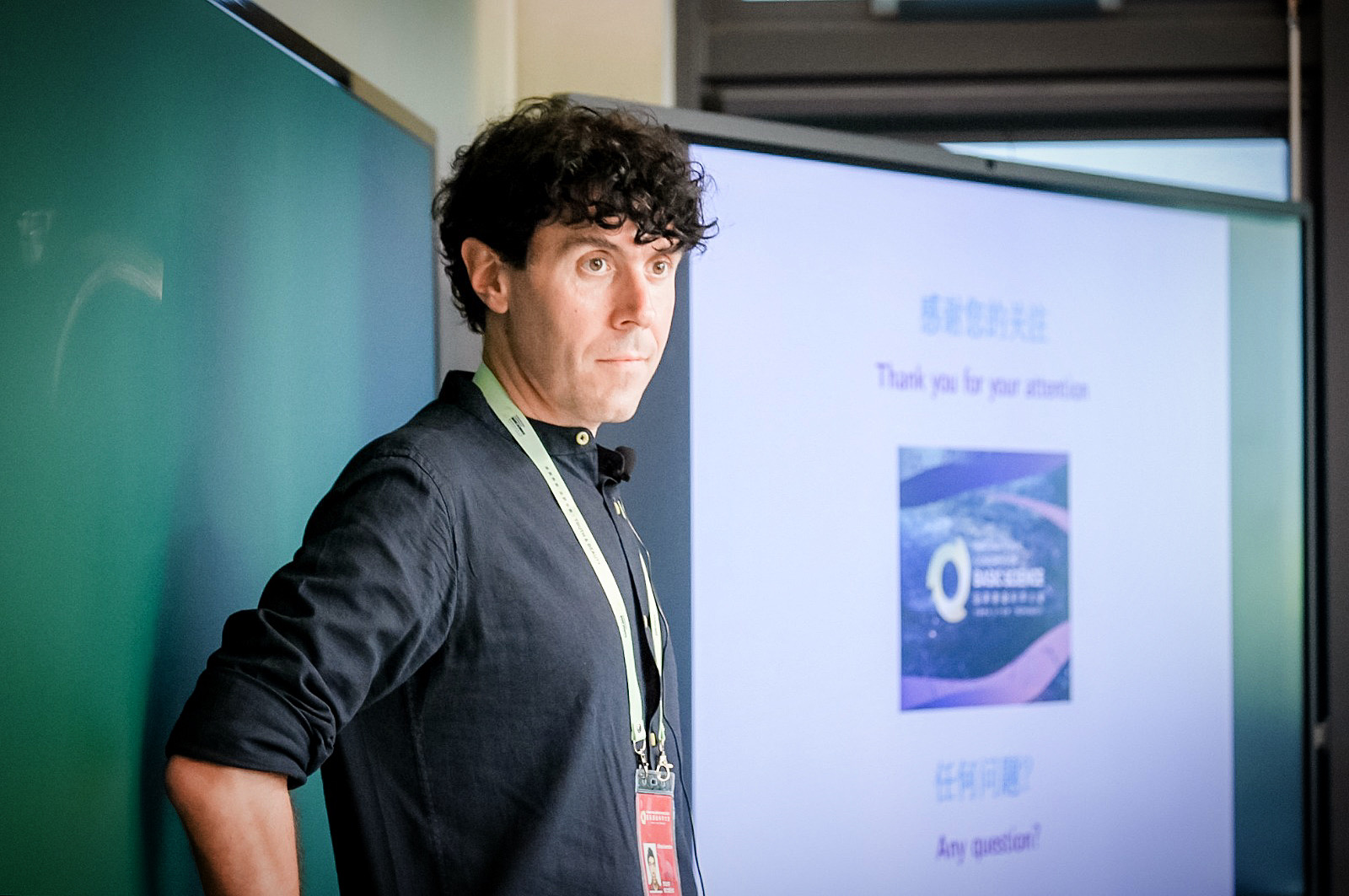
- Alfonso Sorrentino at The First International Congress of Basic Science (July 2023), Yanqi Lake Beijing Institute of Mathematical Sciences and Applications.
- Born: Alfonso Sorrentino; 27 November 1979; Rome, Italy
- Education: Roma Tre University; Princeton University
- Known for: Hamiltonian dynamics Aubry-Mather theory Weak KAM theory Dynamical billiards
- Awards: Guido Fubini prize for Mathematics, Accademia delle Scienze di Torino, Italy (2018).; Barcelona Dynamical System Prize, Societat Catalana de Matemàtiques, Spain (2019).; Best Paper award (Gold medal) at the International Consortium of Chinese Mathematicians, China (2020).; Frontiers of Science award 2023 at the First International Congress of Basic Sciences, China.
- Scientific career
- Fields: Mathematics
- Workplaces: University of Cambridge; Pembroke College; Roma Tre University; University of Rome Tor Vergata
- Doctoral advisor: John Norman Mather

Alfonso Sorrentino (born 27 November 1979) is an Italian mathematician who is currently full professor of mathematical analysis at University of Rome Tor Vergata (Italy).

His main scientific interests are in the field of dynamical systems, specifically, in the study of Hamiltonian dynamical systems by means of variational methods (Aubry-Mather theory), partial differential equations techniques (weak KAM theory and Hamilton-Jacobi equation) and geometric approaches (symplectic geometry and topology).

== Biography and career ==
Sorrentino was a student of John N. Mather at Princeton University, obtaining his Ph.D. in Mathematics in 2008. After his graduation, he held the roles of junior research fellow at Fondation Sciences Mathématiques de Paris (2008–2009), Herchel-Smith Research Fellow at University of Cambridge (2009–2012), Newton Trust Fellow of Pembroke College, Cambridge (2009–2012), and Researcher at Roma Tre University (2012–2014).

== Honors and awards ==
- 2018 Guido Fubini Prize for Mathematics, Accademia delle Scienze di Torino (Italy).
- 2019 Barcelona Dynamical System Prize 2019, Catalan Mathematical Society (Catalunya, Spain).
- 2020 International Consortium of Chinese Mathematicians (ICCM 2020) Best Paper Award (Gold Medal).
- 2023 Frontiers of Science Award, given at the International Congress of Basic Sciences, Beijing July 2023

== Selected writings ==
- A. Sorrentino, Action-minimizing methods in Hamiltonian dynamics. Monograph in the series Mathematical Notes Vol. 50, Princeton University Press, pp. 128, 2015. https://books.google.com/books?id=4PNnBgAAQBAJ
- V. Kaloshin and A. Sorrentino, On the local Birkhoff conjecture for convex billiards, Annals of Math.(2), 188 (1): 315–380, 2018 https://doi.org/10.4007/annals.2018.188.1.6
- G. Huang, V. Kaloshin and A. Sorrentino, On Marked Length Spectrum of Generic Strictly Convex Billiard Tables, Duke Math. Journal, 167 (1): 175 – 209, 2018 https://doi.org/10.1215/00127094-2017-0038
- G. Huang, V. Kaloshin and A. Sorrentino, Nearly circular domains which are integrable close to the boundary are ellipses. Geom. and Funct. Analysis, 28 (2): 334–392, 2018 https://doi.org/10.1007/s00039-018-0440-4
- A. Sorrentino and C. Viterbo, Action minimizing properties and distances on the group of Hamiltonian diffeomorphisms. Geom. & Topol., 14 (4): 2383 - 2403, 2010 https://msp.org/gt/2010/14-4/p15.xhtml
- A. Sorrentino, On the integrability of Tonelli Hamiltonians. Trans. Amer. Math. Soc., 363 (10): 5071 - 5089, 2011 https://www.jstor.org/stable/41307429
- L. Butler and A. Sorrentino, Weak Liouville-Arnol'd theorems and their implications. Comm. Math. Phys., 315 (1): 109 – 133, 2012 https://doi.org/10.1007/s00220-012-1536-6
- S. Marò and A. Sorrentino, Aubry-Mather theory for conformally symplectic systems, Comm. Math. Phys., 354 (2): 775–808, 2017 https://doi.org/10.1007/s00220-017-2900-3
- A. Siconolfi and A. Sorrentino, Global results for Eikonal Hamilton-Jacobi equations on networks, Analysis & PDE 11 (1): 171–211, 2018 https://doi.org/10.2140/apde.2018.11.171
