= Francisco Pozzo =

Argentine footballer

Personal information
- Full name: Francisco José Pozzo
- Date of birth: 15 July 2003 (age 23)
- Place of birth: Buenos Aires, Argentina
- Height: 1.80 m (5 ft 11 in)
- Position: Striker

Team information
- Current team: Unión La Calera (on loan from Vélez Sarsfield)
- Number: 9

Youth career
- Vélez Sarsfield
- 2023–2024: → Talleres (loan)

Senior career*
Years	Team	Apps	(Gls)
2023–	Vélez Sarsfield	0	(0)
2023–2024	→ Talleres (loan)	4	(0)
2026–	→ Unión La Calera (loan)	11	(1)
- * Club domestic league appearances and goals as of 3 May 2026

Francisco José Pozzo (born 15 July 2003) is an Argentine footballer who plays as a striker for Chilean Primera División club Unión La Calera on loan from Vélez Sarsfield.

== Career ==
Born in Buenos Aires, Argentina, Pozzo is a product of Vélez Sarsfield. On 4 August 2023, he was loaned out to Talleres de Córdoba for 18 months and made his professional debut in the 3–1 away loss against Argentinos Juniors for the 2023 Copa de la Liga Profesional. He returned to Vélez Sarsfield in January 2025.

In 2026, Pozzo moved abroad and joined Chilean Primera División club Unión La Calera on a loan for a season with a purchase option. He scored his first goal in the 3–1 home victory against Cobresal on 9 February.
