= Alberto Dou Mas de Xaxàs =

Spanish mathematician and Jesuit (1915–2009)

- Born: 21 December 1915; Olot
- Died: 10 April 2009 (aged 93); San Cugat des Valles
- Occupations: Jesuit, mathematician

Alberto Dou Mas de Xaxàs (21 December 1915, Olot–10 April 2009, San Cugat del Vallés) was a Spanish Jesuit and mathematician.

He fought on the Nationalist side in the Spanish Civil War.

In 1960, he was elected president of the Royal Spanish Mathematical Society.

== Selected works ==
- Fundamentos de Matemáticas.
- Fundamentos de Física.
- The Mathematics Genealogy project.
- Las teorías del movimiento de proyectiles y paralelas de Aristóteles a Einstein.
- La verdad en la Matemática axiomática.
- La mutua influencia entre Matemática y Física. [co-writer]
- Los Cuadritejidos planos.
- The corollarium II to the proposition XXIII of Saccheri's Euclides.
- Las Matemáticas en la España de los Austrias.
- Método de máximos y mínimos.
- Los primeros testimonios del Nuevo Testamento. [co-writer]
- Rang der ebenen 4-Gwebe.
- Upper Estimate of Potential Elastic Energy of a Cylinder.
- Logical and Historical Remarks on Saccheri's Geometry.
- Las derivadas segundas del potencial del volumen.
- De la verdad a la validez en Geometría (1733-1871).
