= 16S rRNA (uracil1498-N3)-methyltransferase =

Class of enzymes

16S rRNA (uracil^{1498}-N^{3})-methyltransferase

Identifiers
- EC no.: 2.1.1.193

Databases
- IntEnz: IntEnz view
- BRENDA: BRENDA entry
- ExPASy: NiceZyme view
- KEGG: KEGG entry
- MetaCyc: metabolic pathway
- PRIAM: profile
- PDB structures: RCSB PDB PDBe PDBsum
Search
- PMC: articles
- PubMed: articles
- NCBI: proteins

16S rRNA (uracil^{1498}-N^{3})-methyltransferase (EC 2.1.1.193, DUF558 protein, YggJ, RsmE, m3U1498 specific methyltransferase) is an enzyme with systematic name S-adenosyl-L-methionine:16S rRNA (uracil^{1498}-N^{3})-methyltransferase. This enzyme catalyses the following chemical reaction

S-adenosyl-L-methionine + uracil^{1498} in 16S rRNA $\rightleftharpoons$ S-adenosyl-L-homocysteine + N^{3}-methyluracil^{1498} in 16S rRNA

The enzyme specifically methylates uracil^{1498} at N^{3} in 16S rRNA.
