= Vadim Kaloshin =

Soviet-born mathematician known for his contributions to dynamical systems

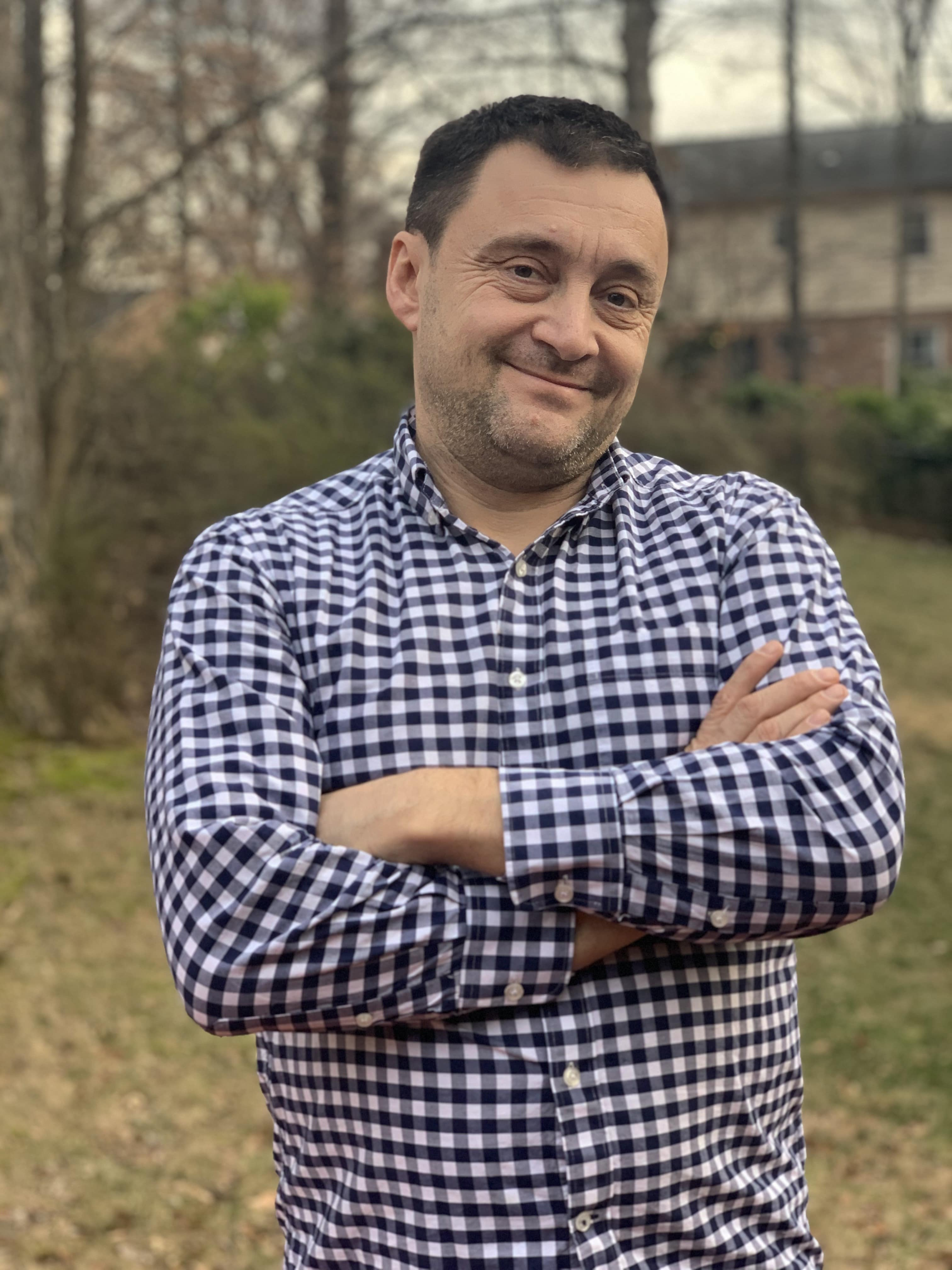

Vadim Kaloshin is a Soviet-born mathematician known for his contributions to dynamical systems. He was a student of John N. Mather at Princeton University, obtaining a Ph.D. in 2001. He was subsequently a C. L. E. Moore instructor at the Massachusetts Institute of Technology, and a faculty member at the California Institute of Technology and Pennsylvania State University. Until 2020 he was the Michael Brin Chair at the University of Maryland, College Park, mathematics professor for the University of Maryland College of Computer, Mathematical, and Natural Sciences. Now he is a chair professor at Institute of Science and Technology Austria.

After receiving his Ph.D. from Princeton University in 2001, he was awarded the American Institute of Mathematics five-year fellowship. He is a recipient of the Sloan fellowship (2004) and of the Simons fellowship (2016). He was awarded a Moscow Mathematical Society Prize (2001) and a Barcelona Prize in Dynamical Systems (2019). In 2020 he received a gold medal from the International Consortium of Chinese Mathematics (ICCM).

He was an invited speaker at the 2006 International Congress of Mathematicians in Madrid, a plenary speaker at the 2015 International Congress on Mathematical Physics in Santiago, Chile, and an invited speaker at the conference Dynamics, Equations and Applications in Kraków in 2019. In 2021 he was awarded a European Research Council (ERC) Advanced Grant.

From 2006 to 2018 he was an editor of Inventiones mathematicae. He is a member of the editorial boards of Advances in Mathematics, Analysis & PDE, Revista Matemática Iberoamericana, and Ergodic Theory and Dynamical Systems.

In 2020 he was elected to Academia Europaea (the Academy of Europe). In 2023 he was elected to the European Academy of Sciences and Arts and received the Frontier of Science Award.
