= Olga Gil Medrano =

Spanish mathematician

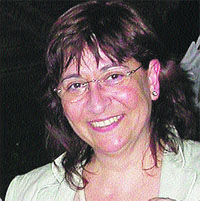

Olga Gil Medrano (born 1956) is a Spanish mathematician who was president of the Royal Spanish Mathematical Society from 2006 to 2009. She is a professor of mathematics at the University of Valencia, where she is also Vice-Rector for International Relations and Cooperation. Her mathematical research concerns differential geometry and geometric analysis; since 2000, she has also been interested in the dissemination of mathematics to the general public.

== Education and career ==
Gil was born in Burgos in 1956.

As an undergraduate student at the University of Valencia, Gil was advised to study engineering, but she ignored the advice, preferring mathematics and physics. She earned a Ph.D. at the University of Valencia in 1982, with a dissertation on Certain Geometric and Topological Properties of Some Classes of Almost-Product Manifolds supervised by Antonio Martínez Naveira. She then studied for a doctorat de troisième cycle in France, at Pierre and Marie Curie University, which she completed in 1985. Her second dissertation, Sur le Problème de Yamabe concernat les variétés localement conformement plates, was supervised by Thierry Aubin.

After completing her second doctorate, she returned to Valencia as a faculty member. She has been a member of the governing board of the University of Valencia since 2000. When she became president of the Royal Spanish Mathematical Society in 2006, she was the first woman elected to that position.

== Recognition ==
In September 2017, the University of Valencia hosted a workshop on geometric analysis in honor of Gil.
