= Science and technology in Spain =

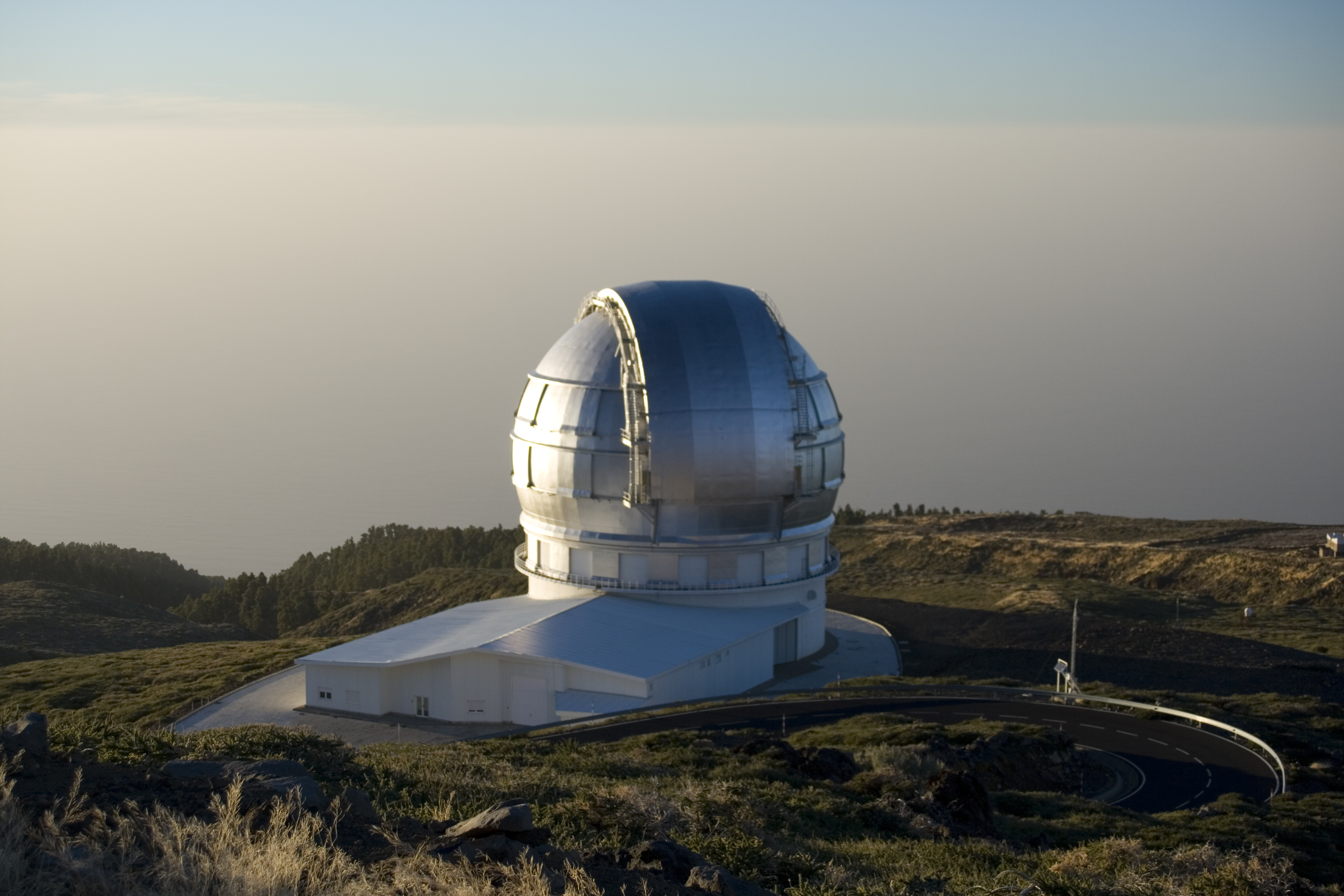
The Gran Telescopio Canarias at sunset.

Science and technology in Spain relates to the set of policies, plans and programs carried out by the Spanish Ministry of Science and Innovation and other organizations aimed at research, development and innovation (R&D&I), as well as the reinforcement Spanish scientific and technological infrastructures and facilities such as universities and commercial laboratories.

Spain has become the ninth scientific power in the world with 2.5% of the total number of scientific publications, thus surpassing Russia in the world ranking of scientific production and surpassing Switzerland and Australia in scientific quality

== Regulations ==
=== Science Law of 1986 ===
Law 13/1986 on the "Promotion and General Coordination of Scientific and Technical Research" placed science for the first time on the Spanish political agenda, laying the foundations for research and its financing, organization and coordination between the State and the autonomous regions. That regulation also led to the birth of the national research plan as an "instrument for financing science". It also meant that public research organizations could create companies, as a solution to the lack of companies that encouraged new technologies and the disconnection of the science-technology system with the productive system.

=== Science, Technology and Innovation Law (2011) ===
It is regulated by Law 14/2011, of 1 June 2011, on "Science, Technology and Innovation", which entered into force six months after its publication. According to the Ninth Final Provision of the Law, some of its provisions have the character of basic legislation. This provides a mechanism for national, regional and corporative entities to cooperate and optimise their resources.

Article 21 of the Law contemplates the pre-doctoral contract.

=== Science Law 2022 ===
In 2020, the Ministry published the prior consultation on the reform of the Science Law. Through the 2021 Budget Law, the legal figure of the state agency was reintroduced for the State Research Agency (AEI) and the Spanish National Research Council (CSIC), which had been transformed into an autonomous body in 2015. State agencies have greater independence for the management of their budget. A new Science Law is expected to be approved in 2022.

== Sources of funding ==
In 2020, Spain will invest 1.24% of its GDP in scientific research, well below the European average of 2.12%.

== Strategic plans ==
Up to 2020, eight editions of the National R&D&I Plan have been published, covering the period from 1988 to 1991 to 2007–2020, currently in force.

Each year a Work Program of the National R&D&I Plan is approved, which serves as a short-term programming tool, and is managed by the Ministries of Science and Innovation (MICINN); Industry, Tourism and Trade; Education (MEFP); and Environment, Rural and Marine Affairs (MARM).

At the end of 2020 the Spanish Government officially presented its Digital Plan 2025 which focussed on the recovery, transformation and resilience of scientific endeavour as a significant contributor to the Spanish economy. The Minister of Digital Development Carme Artigas has announced that starting from late 2022 the country proposes to set up a secure environment where a wide range of companies will be able to test their risky AI systems for socially sensitive areas such as law enforcement, medical diagnostics or educational intervention. The rules proposed by the European Commission in 2021 will be applied with strict oversight in compliance with Spain's National Artificial Intelligence Strategy (ENIA).

"Nanoinventum" is a project led by the University of Barcelona to incorporate science and nanotechnology principles into elementary school level curriculums. The main objective is to help young people become familiar with scientific language and to cultivate a passion for nanotechnology and science in general.

== Public Research Organizations ==
Public Research Organizations (OPI) carry out a large part of the R&D&I activities that are financed with public funds and usually manage some of the programs included in the National Plans.

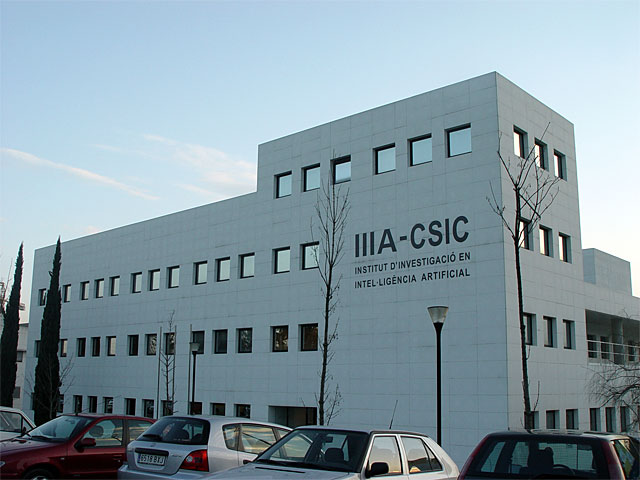
Artificial Intelligence Research Institute, belonging to the CSIC.

The following OPI's are attached to the Ministry of Science and Innovation:

- Spanish National Research Council (CSIC).
- Center for Energy, Environmental and Technological Research (CIEMAT).
- Geological and Mining Institute of Spain (IGME).
- Spanish Institute of Oceanography (IEO).
- National Centre for Metallurgical Research (CENIM-CSIC).
- National Institute of Agricultural and Food Research and Technology (INIA).
- Institute of Astrophysics of the Canary Islands (IAC), in which the Government of the Canary Islands also participates.

The following OPI's are attached to other ministerial departments:

- Hydrodynamic Experimental Channel of El Pardo (CEHIPAR).
- Center for Sociological Research (CIS).
- Centre for Political and Constitutional Studies (CEPC).
- Center for Public Works Studies and Experimentation (CEDEX).
- R&D Centers under the General Directorate of Armament and Material (DGAM) of the Ministry of Defense (MINISDEF).
- Institute of Fiscal Studies (IEF).
- Carlos III Health Institute (ISCIII).
- National Geographic Institute (IGN).
- National Institute for Research and Training on Drugs (INIFD).
- State Meteorological Agency (AEMET).
- National Institute of Aerospace Technology (GOON)
- National Institute of Toxicology and Forensic Sciences (INTCF).

=== Within the national territory ===
The Advisory Committee for Singular Infrastructures (until 2006 called the Advisory Committee for Large Scientific Facilities, CAGIC) distinguishes between two types of Scientific and Technological Facilities: Large Scientific Facilities (GIC) and Medium Size Facilities (ITM). Their recognition as such is the responsibility of the Interministerial Commission for Science and Technology (CICYT).

==== Singular Scientific and Technical Infrastructures (ICTS) ====
Singular Scientific and Technical Infrastructure (ICTS) refers to a facility that is unique or exceptional in Spain, that requires a relatively high investment cost, and that its importance in research or development justifies its availability.

At present, the following facilities are recognized as Spanish ICTS (outdated list):

- Spanish Antarctic Bases.
- Oceanographic Research Vessel Hespérides.
- Cornide de Saavedra Oceanographic Vessel.
- Yebes Astronomical Center.
- TJ-II Thermonuclear Fusion Device.
- CISA High Biological Security Facility.
- Singular Civil Engineering Installations of CEDEX.
- CESGA FinisTerrae Supercomputer.
- MareNostrum and MinoTauro supercomputers of the National Supercomputing Center.
- Fine Chemical Plant of Catalonia.
- Almeria Solar Platform.
- Catalonia Computing and Communications Center.
- RedIRIS.
- Nuclear magnetic resonance laboratory of the Barcelona Science Park.
- Clean Room of the National Microelectronics Center.
- Technology Center of the Institute of Optoelectronic Systems of the Polytechnic University of Madrid.
- Fauna and Flora Collections of the Museum of Natural Sciences and the Royal Botanical Garden.
- ALBA Synchrotron Light Laboratory.
- Oceanic Platform of the Canary Islands.

In addition, these are ICTS located in Spain, but with international participation:

- Calar Alto Astronomical Center.
- Teide Observatory.
- Roque de los Muchachos Observatory.
- Institut de radioastronomie millimétrique.
- Gran Telescopio Canarias.

==== Medium Size Installations (MSI) ====
A Medium Size Installation is defined as an Installation that is unique in Spain, requiring an investment cost of between 3 and 8 million euros and a maintenance cost of more than half a million euros per year.

=== Outside the national territory, with Spanish participation ===
Spain participates in several international scientific programs and organizations. The benefit obtained from this participation is twofold: on the one hand, Spanish scientists can use the facilities for the development of their projects; on the other hand, the business network has the opportunity to make important business contracts.

Some of the facilities in which Spain participates are:

- European Space Agency.
- European Laboratory for Particle Physics.
- European Molecular Biology Laboratory.
- European Synchrotron Radiation Facility.
- Institut Laue-Langevin.
- ISIS, pulsed neutron and muon source.
- CERN.

== Scientific and technological fields ==
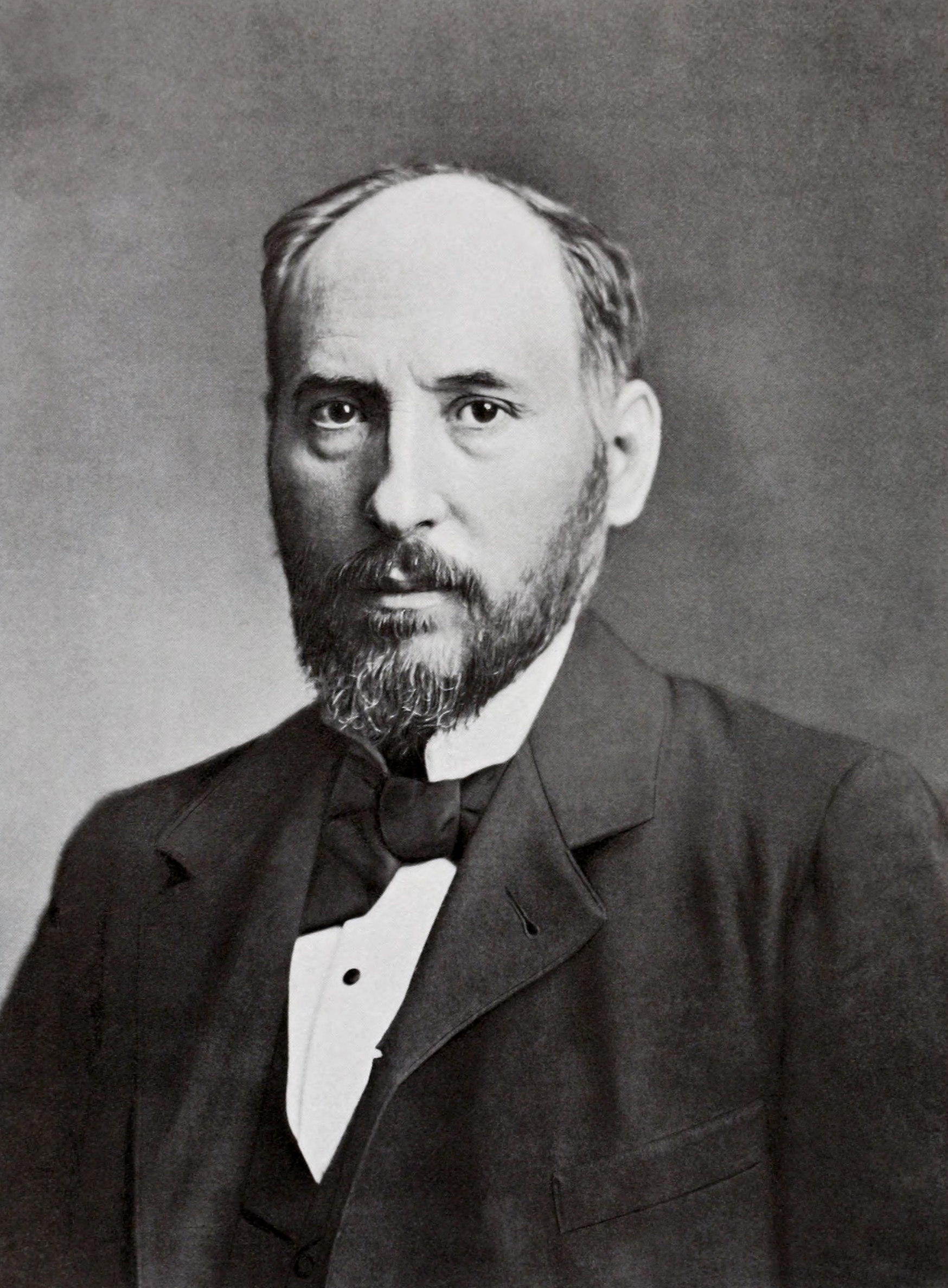
Santiago Ramón y Cajal, Nobel Prize in Medicine.

Spain was ranked 29th in the Global Innovation Index in 2025.

=== Physics ===
In 2020 Pablo Jarillo-Herrero was awarded the Wolf Prize in Physics, considered the prelude to the Nobel Prize. In 2009 Juan Ignacio Cirac was nominated for the same prestigious award for his research in quantum computing and quantum optics.

=== Chemistry ===
Among the Spanish contributions to chemistry are the research of Francisco Mojica that led to the birth of the CRISPR gene editing technique, a term he personally coined. Mariano Barbacid is one of the most internationally recognized biochemists, among his contributions is that he managed to isolate the human H-ras oncogene in bladder carcinoma. This was an incredible breakthrough in the study of the molecular basis of cancer. He currently directs the Spanish National Cancer Research Centre (CNIO).

=== Mathematics ===
In 2020, Spain ranked seventh in the world in terms of scientific impact in Mathematics. Internationally, centers such as the Institute of Mathematical Sciences (ICMAT), founded in 2007, and the Basque Center for Applied Mathematics (BCAM), founded in 2008, stand out. Carlos Beltrán solved Smale's Problem number 17, finding a probabilistic algorithm with polynomial complexity, and published his solution in 2009.

=== Medicine ===
Michael Servetus described in the 16th century the pulmonary circulation of the blood. Francisco Romero in 1801 performed the first heart operation.

Spain has a Nobel Prize in Medicine, Santiago Ramón y Cajal (1906), pioneer in the description of the functioning of the nervous system. Others were on the verge of being nominated, such as Jaime Ferrán y Clúa, discoverer of the cholera vaccine, which put an end to the epidemic that devastated Spain in the 19th century. He would later develop vaccines for tetanus, typhoid, tuberculosis and rabies. Also nominated were José Gómez Ocaña and August Pi i Sunyer. In the 19th century, the Balmis Expedition was the first international health expedition in history, with the aim of bringing the smallpox vaccine to all continents, a disease that was causing thousands of deaths of children worldwide. In 1921, surgeon Fidel Pagés developed the epidural anesthesia technique. The engineer Manuel Jalón Corominas invented the disposable hypodermic needle. Today Pedro Cavadas is internationally recognized for his milestones in transplant surgery.

=== Engineering ===
The galleon, a Spanish invention, enabled the birth of the Spanish Empire and its conquest of the seas. Narcís Monturiol, inventor of air-independent propulsion, and Isaac Peral were among the creators of the submarine. Juan de la Cierva invented the articulated rotor and the autogyro, precursor of the helicopter. In 1907, Leonardo Torres Quevedo (1852–1936) started up the world's first aerial lift for passengers on Mount Ulía in San Sebastián.

=== Biology and biotechnology ===
In the biotechnology sector, institutions such as the National Biotechnology Center, companies such as PharmaMar and Zendal and researchers such as Mariano Esteban stand out.

=== Nuclear energy ===
Spain currently has generation II nuclear reactors, with the most advanced countries developing the generation IV reactor. It can be said that the father of nuclear energy in Spain was José María Otero de Navascués. Today the Center for Energy, Environmental and Technological Research (CIEMAT) is the main Spanish research center in this area, which has the TJ-II stellarator, and is planning a successor, the TJ-III. Pablo Rodríguez Fernández is a leading researcher in the race for nuclear fusion. Granada is a candidate to host IFMIF-DONES from 2030 onwards.

=== Computer science ===
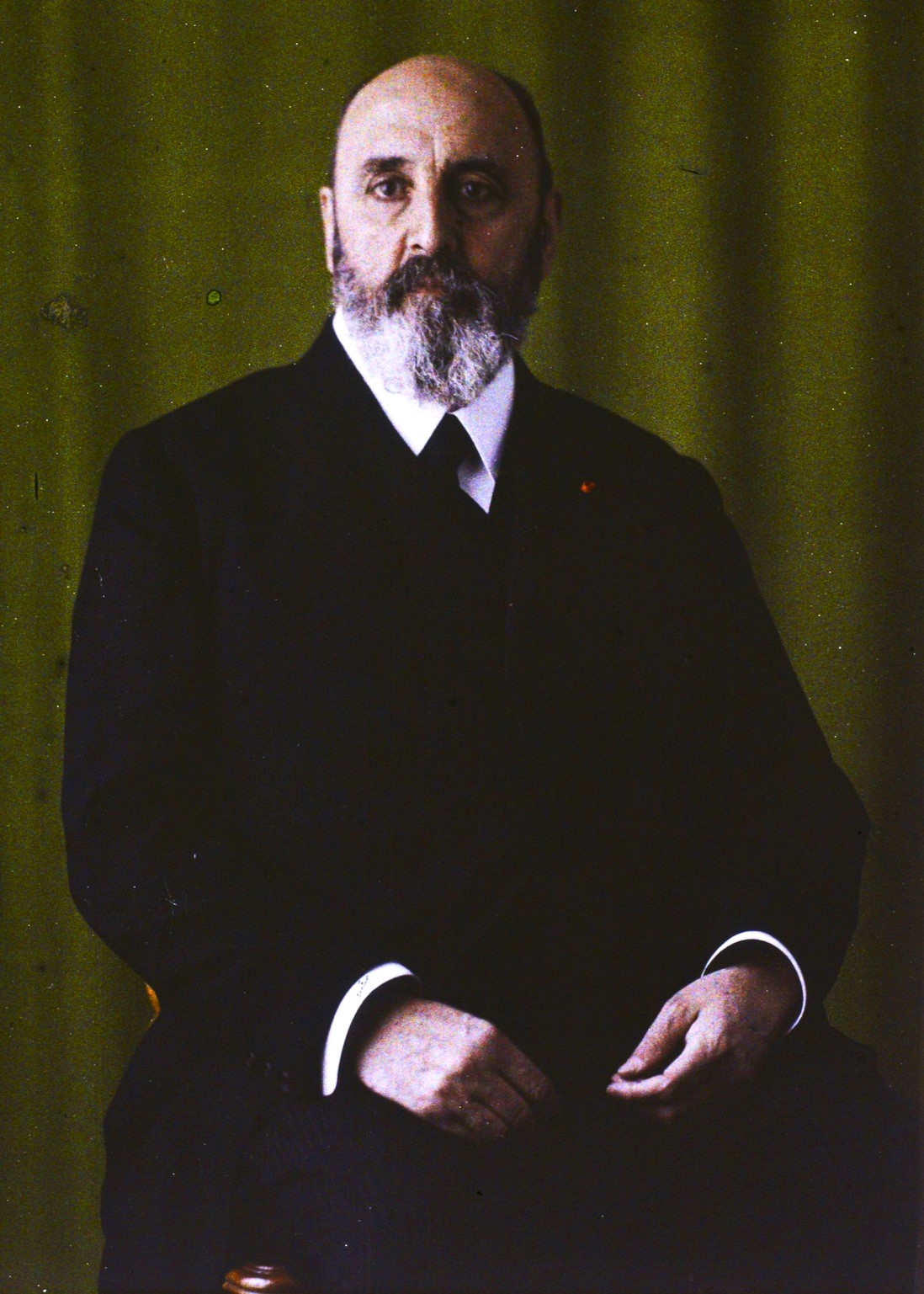
Leonardo Torres Quevedo, pioneer of computing and remote control.

==== Hardware and electronics ====
Ramón Verea (1833–1899) created the first mechanical calculator capable of direct multiplication.

Leonardo Torres Quevedo (1852–1936) created modern wireless remote-control operation principles and analog calculating machines that could solve algebraic equations. In 1912, he built an automaton for playing chess endgames, El Ajedrecista, which has been considered the first computer game in history. He also introduced the idea of floating-point arithmetic to computers for the first time.

José García Santesmases (1907–1989) built the first analog computer and the first Spanish-made microprocessor. In 1967 he launched the Factor-P, the first computer manufactured in Spain.

In 2016 and 2017 BQ became the third best-selling smartphone brand in Spain, with phones designed in the country. Towards the end of the 1990s and early 2000s several companies manufactured laptops in Spain, most notably Airis and Inves. By 2021, Primux, Slimbook, Vant and Mountain already designed and assembled their computers in Spain.

Between 1987 and 2009 there was a large microchip factory in Tres Cantos, but it closed due to the difficulty of competing with the Asian market. Currently there are Spanish companies with microchip production capacity on a smaller scale, but which also have design capacity, such as Televés, a pioneer in Europe in the use of DIE electronic components (electronic components without encapsulation) and which also has the capacity to manufacture MMIC circuits, Ikor, and Anafocus, dedicated to the manufacture of CMOS image sensors.

==== Software ====
Between 1983 and 1992, Spain became one of the largest producers of video games, in what is called the golden age of the Spanish video game. Today FX Interactive, heir of Dinamic Software, is among the most prominent companies.

==== Internet ====
At the end of the 1990s IRC-Hispano was the reference as a social community in the Hispanic world. Other software companies that have achieved great repercussion are the search engine Olé, Terra Networks or Tuenti. Today, Wallapop, Fotocasa, Cabify and Rakuten TV stand out.

=== Space ===
The evolution of astronomical navigation, thanks to the contributions of astronomers such as Alonso de Santa Cruz, Juan Arias de Loyola and Jorge Juan y Santacilia was also key to Spain's preponderance in the oceans.

Since 1968 the National Institute for Aerospace Technology has concatenated scientific satellite programs, starting with the Intasat Program, continuing with the Minisat program which was a qualitative leap in the 90's, and continuing up to the current Small Satellite Constellation Program. Many of the instruments used in space missions to Mars and asteroids are developed at the Astrobiology Center (CAB). Among the major contributors in the space area are Emilio Herrera, inventor of the stratonautical space suit, predecessor of the space suit; Enrique Trillas, promoter of space science programs; and Pedro Duque, the first Spanish astronaut.

== Science and Technology Parks ==
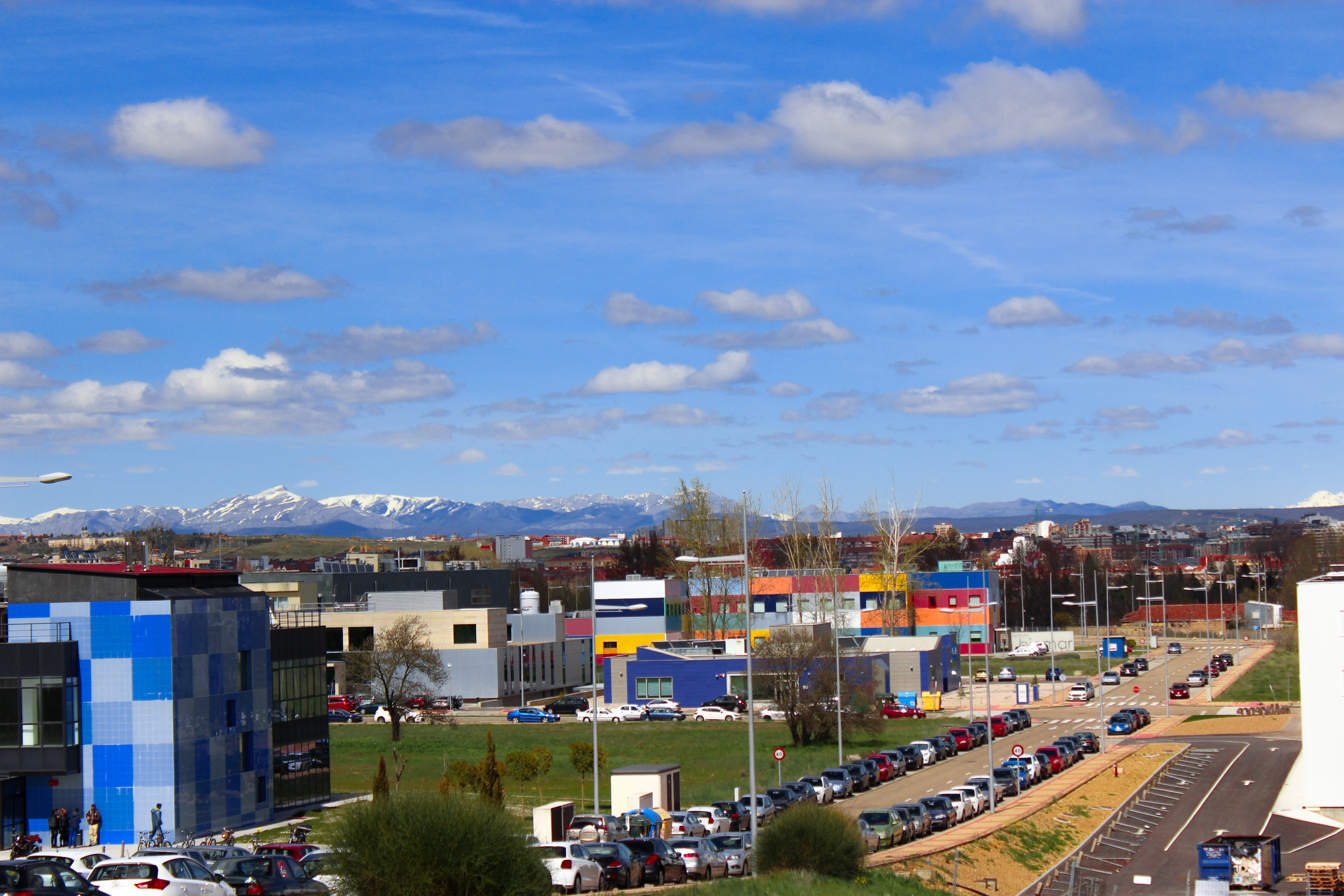
León Technology Park.

In Spain there are many science and technology parks, all of them are usually grouped in the Association of Science and Technology Parks of Spain (APTE).

- Espaitec. Universitat Jaume I Science, Technology and Business Park.
- Alava Technology Park.
- Science and Technology Park of Castilla-La Mancha in Albacete.
- Science and Technology Park of Alcalá.
- Science and Technology Park of Jaén (Geolit).
- Mediterranean Science Park in Alicante.
- Asturias Technology Park.
- Balearic Technological Innovation Park.
- Barcelona Science Park.
- 22@Barcelona.
- Bizkaia Technology Park – Zamudio.
- Center for Technological Development of the University of Cantabria.
- Castilla y León Technology Parks.
- Galicia Technology Park.
- Gijon Science and Technology Park.
- Granada Health Sciences Technological Park.
- Carlos III University Leganés Technological Science Park.
- Madrid Science Park.
- Andalusia Technology Park (PTA) in Malaga.
- Walqa Technology Park in Huesca.
- La Salle Innovation Park.
- San Sebastian Technology Park.
- Cartuja 93 Science and Technology Park in Seville.
- València Technology Park.
- Polytechnic City of Innovation.
- Vallés Technology Park.
- Vigo Technology and Logistics Park.
- Science and Technology Park of Cantabria (PCTCAN)
- ICT City in A Coruña.
- Bases antárticas de España (Antarctic bases in Spain)

== International Programs ==
The international R&D&I programs in which Spain participates are usually focused on the European area, and the most important are the following:

- Framework Program, of the European Union for the promotion and support of R&D&I.
- ERA Nets, articulated within the Framework Program, are actions to develop a European research area.
- Collaborative Research Programmes (EUROCORES)
- Science and Technology for Development (CYTED), Ibero-American program of science and technology for development.
- European Cooperation in Science and Technology (COST), with the participation of 34 European countries.
- EMBC/EMBO/EMBL, the European Molecular Biology Conference, Organization and Laboratory.
- EUREKA Program, an initiative to support cooperative R&D in Europe, promoted in Spain by the PROFIT Program.
- European Space Agency, European organization for cooperation in space research and technology. Spain participates in the scientific, shuttle, human spaceflight and microgravity, Earth observation, telecommunications, satellite navigation and Hispasat-related programs.
- CERN, European organization for nuclear research.
- ESRF, scientific cooperation at the European Synchrotron Radiation Facility.
- Institut Laue-Langevin, experimental research on microscopic structures and material dynamics.
- Global Biodiversity Information Facility, international program for the study of global biodiversity.
- International Institute for Computer Science, an extension of the Department of Electrical Engineering and Computer Science at the University of California, of which Spain has been a member since 14 November 1998.
- Integrated Ocean Drilling Program, an international marine research program.
- International Arctic Science Committee (IASC) since 2009.

== Popular science ==
The Spanish Foundation for Science and Technology (FECYT) is a public foundation under the Ministry of Science and Innovation, whose mission is to foster science and innovation, promoting their integration and approach to society. The National Museum of Science and Technology (MUNCYT) is dedicated to conservation and to popular science and technology. It has two sites, one in Alcobendas and the other in A Coruña.

== See also ==
- History of science and technology in Spain
- Open access in Spain
- Spanish Inventions
- Spanish Inventors
- Ministry of Science and Innovation
- ¡Que inventen ellos!
