= Materiales de Construcción =

Spanish construction materials journal

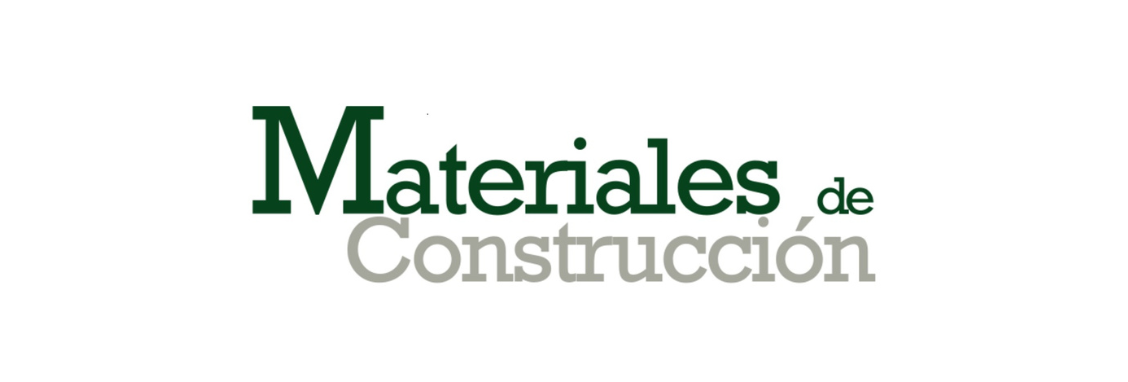
- Discipline: Materials science, civil engineering
- Language: English
- Edited by: Instituto de Ciencias de la Construcción Eduardo Torroja

Publication details
- History: 1949–present
- Publisher: (Spanish National Research Council) (Spain)
- Frequency: Quarterly
- Open access: Yes
- License: CC BY 4.0
- Impact factor: 1.3 (2025)

Standard abbreviations
- ISO 4: Mater. Constr.

Indexing
- CODEN: MCUAAA
- ISSN: 0465-2746 (print); 1988-3226 (web)
- LCCN: sf80000676
- OCLC no.: 6388023

Links
- Journal homepage; Online archive

Materiales de Construcción is a peer-reviewed open-access scientific journal published by the Spanish National Research Council (Consejo Superior de Investigaciones Científicas) through the Instituto de Ciencias de la Construcción Eduardo Torroja. It covers research on Materials science and civil engineering, including cement, concrete, ceramics, polymers, and related topics.

== History ==
The journal was established in 1949 at the Technical Institute for Construction and Cement under the title Últimos avances en materiales de construcción. Boletín de circulación limitada (ISSN 1698-9333). It was renamed Materiales de Construcción. Últimos avances (ISSN 0465-2746) in 1958, and has appeared under its current title since 1974.

Online publication began in 2007; the print edition was discontinued in 2014, after which the journal has been issued exclusively in electronic form, with articles available in PDF, HTML, and XML-JATS formats.

== Scope ==
The journal publishes original research articles in English. Its stated areas of coverage include the physical and chemical processes of cement and binder formation, the composition and properties of cement and concrete, the durability and weathering of building materials, the restoration of heritage structures, the use of industrial by-products in construction, and the performance of other materials such as gypsum, lime, polymers, recycled materials, stone, brick, glass, and wood.

== Abstracting and indexing ==
Materiales de Construcción is indexed in the Web of Science (Science Citation Index Expanded) and covered by Journal Citation Reports. It is also indexed in Scopus.

The journal holds the FECYT Seal of Quality (Sello de Calidad FECYT). It is additionally listed in the Directory of Open Access Journals (DOAJ) and in the Latindex Catalogue 2.0.

A bibliometric study covering the period 2003–2012 found high levels of author diversification and institutional collaboration, and documented growth in the journal's citation impact over the period.

A bibliometric study of Spanish scientific output in the Construction & Building Technology subject category of Web of Science (1997–2008) found that Materiales de Construcción accounted for a substantial share of indexed Spanish publications in the field alongside Cement and Concrete Research.
