= Epigraphia 3D =

- 3D modeling of epigraphic inscriptions
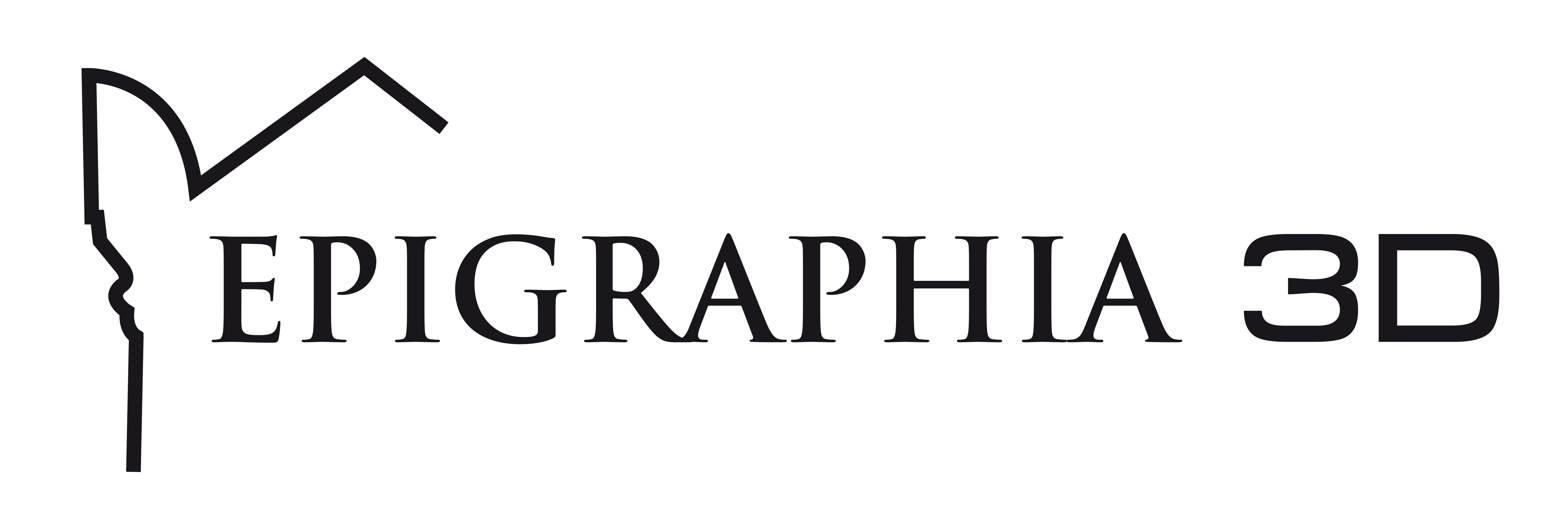
- Project logo
- Website: epigraphia3d.es
- Museums: Museo Arqueológico Nacional. 37 inscriptions.; Museo Nacional de Arte Romano de Mérida. 59 inscriptions.

Epigraphia 3D is a scientific project that consists in 3D models of ancient (mainly Roman) inscriptions. Its scope includes scientific research, education in epigraphy, and encouraging interest of the general public.

It has been developed with funding from the Fundación Española para la Ciencia y la Tecnología (Ministerio de Economía y Competitividad) and Universidad de Las Palmas de Gran Canaria.

== History ==
In 2013, Fundación Española para la Ciencia y la Tecnología (FECYT) funded the project "Descifrando inscripciones romanas en 3D: Ciencia epigráfica virtual" (Decrypting Roman inscriptions in 3D: virtual epigraphic Science). This project was proposed as a multidisciplinary work including historians, linguists and engineers. Its objective was to provide "the first collection of Roman inscriptions in 3D, worldwide", making epigraphy more interesting to young people and facilitating its study.

The first phase comprised 37 inscriptions from Museo Arqueológico Nacional (National Archaeological Museum of Spain), of different types (funerary, votive ...) and support s(stone, metal, clay ...) A bibliography card with the principal data was made for each inscription. . In 2014 the project was funded again from the FECYT, to add 59 inscriptions from the collection of the Museo Nacional de Arte Romano de Mérida (National Museum of Roman Art in Mérida).

It is not yet possible to visualise any of the inscriptions directly on the official website, but they can be in 3D with the use of Sketchfab

== Project results ==
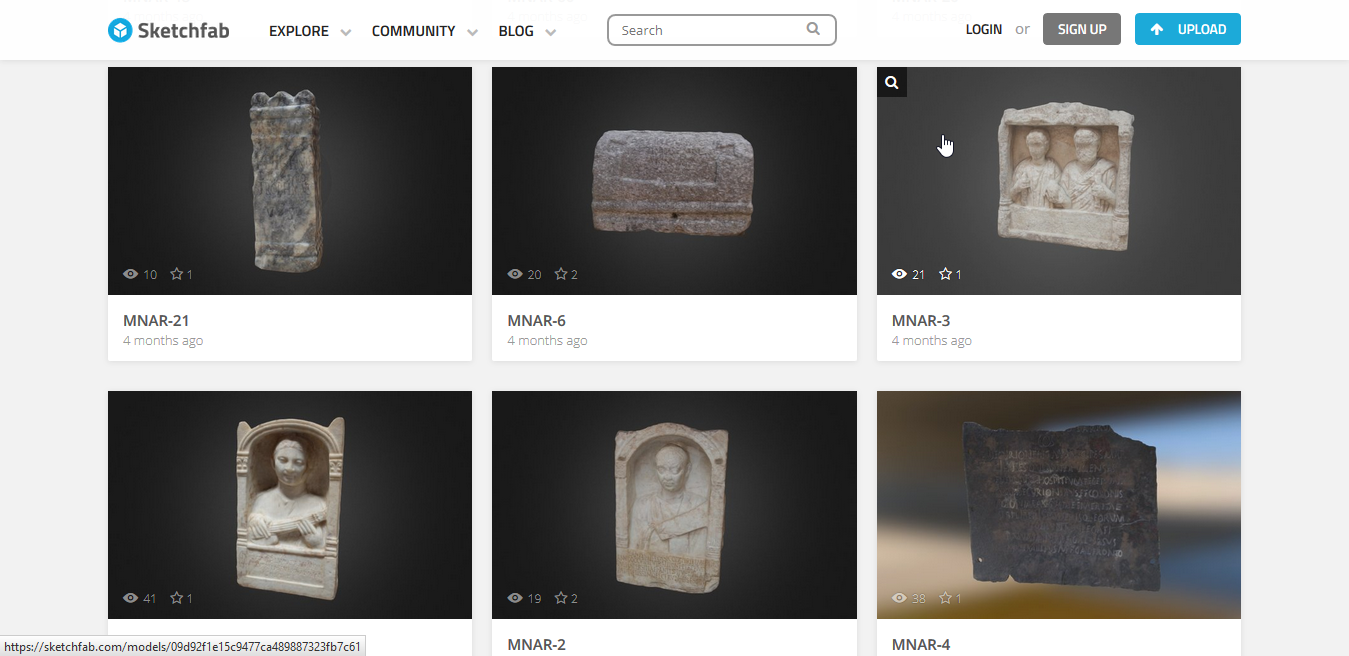
Captura del perfil de Sketchfab de Epigraphia 3D

At the beginning of 2016, Epigraphia had 97 3D models on Sketchfab, all of with their respective bibliography cards.

The project has a website with information about the own project, galleries with the 3D models and a section with "Resources" created by the researchers to introduce Latin epigraphy to the general public. It also has an interactive map showing the origin of the inscriptions.

=== Articles ===
The project also has originated a serie of publications in different journals:

- Ramírez Sánchez, M.; García Sánchez, M.; Giralt Soler, S. (2015): "Epigraphia 3D. Un proyecto de innovación científica en la divulgación del patrimonio epigráfico de Hispania", Epigraphica 77 (pp. 371–396).
- Ramírez Sánchez, M.; Suárez Rivero, J. P.; Castellano Hernández, M. Á. (2014): "Epigrafía digital: tecnología 3D de bajo coste para la digitalización de inscripciones y su acceso desde ordenadores y dispositivos móviles", El profesional de la información 23/5 (pp. 467–474).
