= Fernando Albericio =

Spanish chemist

Fernando Albericio is a Spanish chemist, recognized for his contributions to the field of organic chemistry, particularly in peptide synthesis and drug development.

== Background ==
Albericio earned his Ph.D. in chemistry from the University of Barcelona in 1981. He became a full professor at the University of Barcelona in 1995 and later served as executive director of the Barcelona Science Park from 2005 to 2012, where he was involved in field of biotechnology entrepreneurship. From 2014 to 2015, he served as the founding rector of Yachay Tech University in Ecuador. Since 2016, he has been affiliated with the University of KwaZulu-Natal in South Africa as a research professor.

Albericio’s research focuses on the development of methodologies for the synthesis of peptides and other bioactive compounds. He has contributed to the design and commercialization of numerous reagents and materials used in peptide synthesis, including ChemMatrix resin and OxymaPure.

Albericio was honored with the Lifetime Achievement Award at the 2024 European Peptide Synthesis Conference (EPSC) in the Czech Republic, in recognition of his contributions to the field of peptide synthesis. He also serves a editor of the International Journal of Peptide Research and Therapeutics and as a Councillor for the American Peptide Society.

Throughout his career, Albericio has published extensively, with over 900 scientific articles. He has a high number of citations to his work (49,559) and an h-index of 107.

== Selected publications ==
- Góngora-Benítez M, Tulla-Puche J, Albericio F (2014). Multifaceted roles of disulfide bonds. Peptides as therapeutics. Chemical Reviews. doi:10.1021/Cr400031Z
- Subirós-Funosas R, Prohens R, Barbas R, El-Faham A, Albericio F (2010). Oxyma: an efficient additive for peptide synthesis to replace the benzotriazole-based HOBt and HOAt with a lower risk of explosion. Chemistry (Weinheim An Der Bergstrasse, Germany). doi:10.1002/Chem.200900614
- Ruiz-Sanchis P, Savina SA, Albericio F, Álvarez M. Structure, bioactivity and synthesis of natural products with hexahydropyrrolo[2,3-b]indole. Chemistry (Weinheim An Der Bergstrasse, Germany). doi:10.1002/Chem.201001451
- El-Faham A, Albericio F (2011). Peptide coupling reagents, more than a letter soup. Chemical Reviews. 111: 6557-602. doi:10.1021/Cr100048W
- Isidro-Llobet A, Alvarez M, Albericio F (2009). Amino acid-protecting groups. Chemical Reviews. doi:10.1021/Cr800323S
- Bruckdorfer T, Marder O, Albericio F (2004). From production of peptides in milligram amounts for research to multi-tons quantities for drugs of the future. Current Pharmaceutical Biotechnology. doi:10.2174/1389201043489620
