= Institute for Research in Biomedicine =

Research institute in Catalonia, Spain

Coordinates: 41°22′53″N 2°07′06″E

Institute for Research in Biomedicine (IRB Barcelona)
- Institut de Recerca Biomèdica
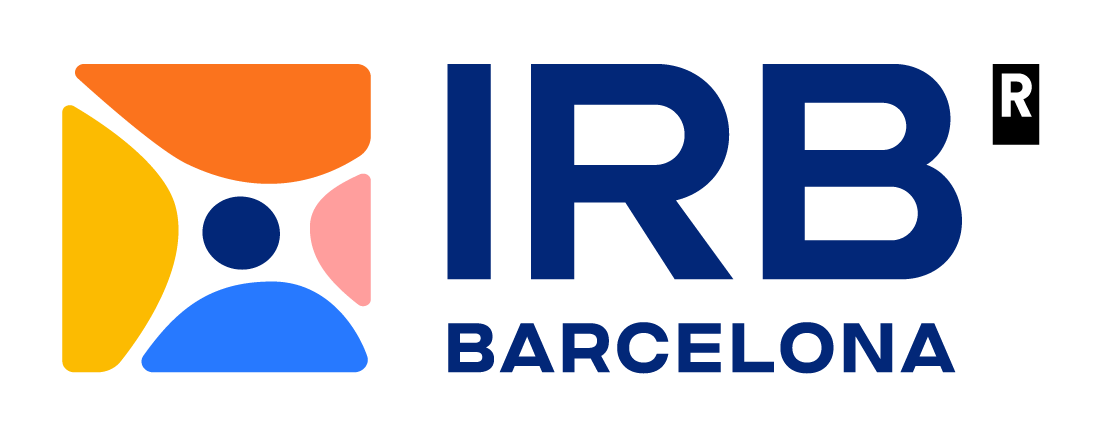
- Established: 2005; 21 years ago
- Research type: Biomedical research
- Director: Francesc Posas
- Location: Baldiri Reixac, 10. Barcelona, Catalonia, Spain, Barcelona, Catalonia, Spain
- Campus: Urban
- Website: irbbarcelona.org

The Institute for Research in Biomedicine (IRB Barcelona) (Catalan: Institut de Recerca Biomèdica; Spanish: Instituto de Investigación Biomédica) is a biomedical research institute located in Barcelona, Spain. It conducts multidisciplinary research to advance the understanding of cancer and diseases associated with ageing. Established in 2005 by the Generalitat de Catalunya and the University of Barcelona, it is based in the Barcelona Science Park (PCB) and is part of the CERCA network and the Barcelona Institute of Science and Technology (BIST).

IRB Barcelona hosts 30 research groups and nine technology platforms, with over 450 researchers representing 38 nationalities. Its research integrates molecular and cellular biology, structural and computational biology, and chemistry, with applications in proteomics, genomics, biostatistics, mass spectrometry, and advanced microscopy.

The director of the institute is Dr. Francesc Posas, and Dr. Joan Massagué serves as scientific advisor.

== History ==
IRB Barcelona was founded in October 2005 following approval by the Generalitat de Catalunya and the University of Barcelona, with Dr. Joan Guinovart serving as the institute’s first director. In its early years, IRB Barcelona launched its International PhD Programme, created its first spin-off company, Omnia Molecular, and inaugurated the Barcelona BioMed Conferences in 2006. The institute went on to establish collaborations with hospitals in 2008 and secured its first major European grants the following year, including an FP7 Coordinated Grant and an ERC Starting Grant.

Since its founding, the institute has created multiple spin-off companies including iProteos (2011), Inbiomotion (2011), Nostrum BioDiscovery (2016), Ona Therapeutics (2019), Gate2Brain (2020), and Nuage Therapeutics (2021), in addition to its first spin-off, Omnia Molecular (2006).

== Research ==
IRB Barcelona’s research is organised around three major programmes:

- Cancer: Coordinated by Dr. Eduard Batlle, this programme focuses on the molecular, cellular and physiological processes underlying cancer and metastasis, its most lethal complication. Research addresses malignant transformation and the relationship between stem cells and cancer to inform treatment strategies.
- Ageing and Metabolism: Coordinated by Dr. Salvador Aznar Benitah, this programme studies mechanisms underlying ageing and metabolic disorders, with the goal of developing precision therapies for age-related diseases and promoting healthy ageing.
- Mechanisms of Disease: Coordinated by Dr. Marco Milán, this programme investigates the cellular and molecular bases of human diseases, integrating genetics, proteomics, and animal models.

=== Research technologies ===
IRB Barcelona hosts nine core technology platforms that support all research programmes and groups:

- Advanced digital microscopy
- Biostatistics / Bioinformatics
- Functional genomics
- Histopathology
- Mass spectrometry
- Protein expression
- Mouse mutant service
- Drosophila injection service
- Drug screening

Researchers also have access to platforms at the Barcelona Science Park (PCB) and the University of Barcelona.

== Selected discoveries ==
IRB Barcelona researchers have contributed to several notable scientific advances, including:

MAF Test

In 2025, IRB Barcelona’s spin-off Inbiomotion, founded by Dr. Roger Gomis, introduced the MAF Test, a biomarker assay that helps oncologists identify which early-stage breast cancer patients are most likely to benefit from adjuvant treatment with bisphosphonates. The test, now implemented in several major Spanish hospitals, enables more precise and personalized therapy.

Discovery of DNA ‘barcodes’ that reveal how blood ages

In 2025, researchers at IRB Barcelona and the Centre for Genomic Regulation (CRG), led by Dr. Alejo Rodríguez-Fraticelli, identified naturally occurring methylation patterns in DNA that act as “barcodes,” revealing how blood ages over time. The study, published in Nature, showed that from around age 50, a small number of blood stem cell clones begin to dominate blood production, leading to reduced cellular diversity and increased vulnerability to disease. The findings provide a basis for early detection of ageing-related disorders and for exploring potential rejuvenation therapies in humans.

Predicting patient response to immunotherapy

In 2024, researchers at IRB Barcelona led by Núria López Bigas identified five independent factors that predict how cancer patients respond to checkpoint inhibitor immunotherapies. Published in Nature Genetics, the study found that tumour mutational burden, T-cell infiltration, TGF-β activity, prior treatments, and tumour proliferation together determine patient outcomes, providing a framework to refine biomarker use and advance personalised cancer treatment.

Discovery of a mechanism underlying idiopathic autism

In 2024, researchers at IRB Barcelona led by Dr. Raúl Méndez and Dr. Xavier Salvatella uncovered a molecular mechanism that explains around 80% of idiopathic autism cases. Published in Nature, the study showed that loss of a small segment in the neuronal protein CPEB4 disrupts its ability to form dynamic condensates, impairing the expression of genes essential for brain development and offering new possibilities for targeted autism therapies.

Development of an antibody that targets metastatic stem cells

In 2022, researchers at IRB Barcelona led by Eduard Batlle, in collaboration with Merus N.V., developed MCLA-158 (Petosemtamab), a bispecific antibody that targets cancer stem cells by binding to the EGFR and LGR5 proteins. Published in Nature Cancer, the study showed that MCLA-158 blocks tumour growth and prevents metastasis in preclinical models, marking a key step toward therapies that selectively attack metastatic stem cells without harming healthy tissue.

Palmitic acid and metastasis

In 2021, a team led by Dr. Salvador Aznar Benitah at IRB Barcelona discovered that exposure to palmitic acid—a saturated fatty acid found in palm oil—enhances the ability of cancer cells to metastasize and leaves a long-lasting “memory” that makes tumours more aggressive. Published in Nature, the study showed that this effect occurs through changes in gene expression and tumour innervation, and that blocking Schwann cells can prevent metastasis.

== Organisation ==
IRB Barcelona’s governance structure includes the Board of Trustees, the Governing Board, and the External Advisory Board.

- Board of Trustees: the highest governing body, supervising research and approving funds, chaired on a two-year rotating basis by the Catalan Health Minister and the Catalan Research Minister.
- Governing Board: oversees management activities delegated by the Board of Trustees and is chaired by the Director General for Research of the Generalitat de Catalunya.
- External Advisory Board: composed of 14 international biomedical scientists, chaired by Joan Massagué, with members including Ewan Birney, Michael Czech, John Edgar Dick, Anne Ephrussi, Michael S. Glickman, Jesús Jiménez Barbero, Johanna Joyce, Prisca Liberali, Thomas Muir, María Ángela Nieto, Alejandro Sánchez Alvarado, Derek Tan, and Alfonso Valencia.

== Funding ==
The institute’s primary funding comes from the Generalitat de Catalunya through the Departments of Health and of Economy and Knowledge. Additional support is provided by competitive grants from national and European public agencies such as the European Regional Development Fund (ERDF) and the Spanish Ministry of Science, as well as private institutions including the BBVA Foundation, La Caixa Foundation, Asociación Española contra el Cáncer, Cris contra el Cáncer, and the Mark Foundation.

IRB Barcelona also receives private donations from companies, foundations, and individuals. It is currently completing the “Metastasis Challenge,” a campaign to raise €5 million for metastasis research.

== Selected awards ==
- Severo Ochoa Centre of Excellence accreditations by the Spanish State Research Agency (2011, 2015, 2019, 2023)
- Narcís Monturiol Plaque from the Generalitat de Catalunya (2012)
- HR Excellence in Research by the European Commission (2014)
- Catalan National Innovation Award by the Generalitat de Catalunya (2022)
