= Dialnet =

Dialnet may refer to:

- Dialnet (bibliographic database), a database maintained by the University of La Rioja
- Dialnet (networking), an UUCPnet-like modem communications system used by Symbolics, Inc. Lisp machines

== See also ==
- Dial-up Internet access
