= Izaskun =

Izaskun is a given name. Notable people with the given name include:

- Izaskun Aramburu Balda (born 1975), Spanish sprint canoer
- Izaskun Bengoa Pérez (born 1975), Spanish road cyclist
- Izaskun Bilbao Barandica (born 1961), Spanish/Basque Nationalist politician
- Izaskun Lacunza, Spanish scientist
- Izaskun Manuel Llados (born 1970), Spanish Paralympic alpine skier
- Izaskun Osés Ayúcar (born 1985), blind Spanish Paralympic long-distance runner
- Izaskun Uranga Amézaga (born 1950), Spanish musician
- Izaskun Zubizarreta Gerendiain (1970–2024), Spanish ski mountaineer
