= Joan Guinovart =

Spanish pharmacist and scientist (1947–2025)

Joan Josep Guinovart Cirera
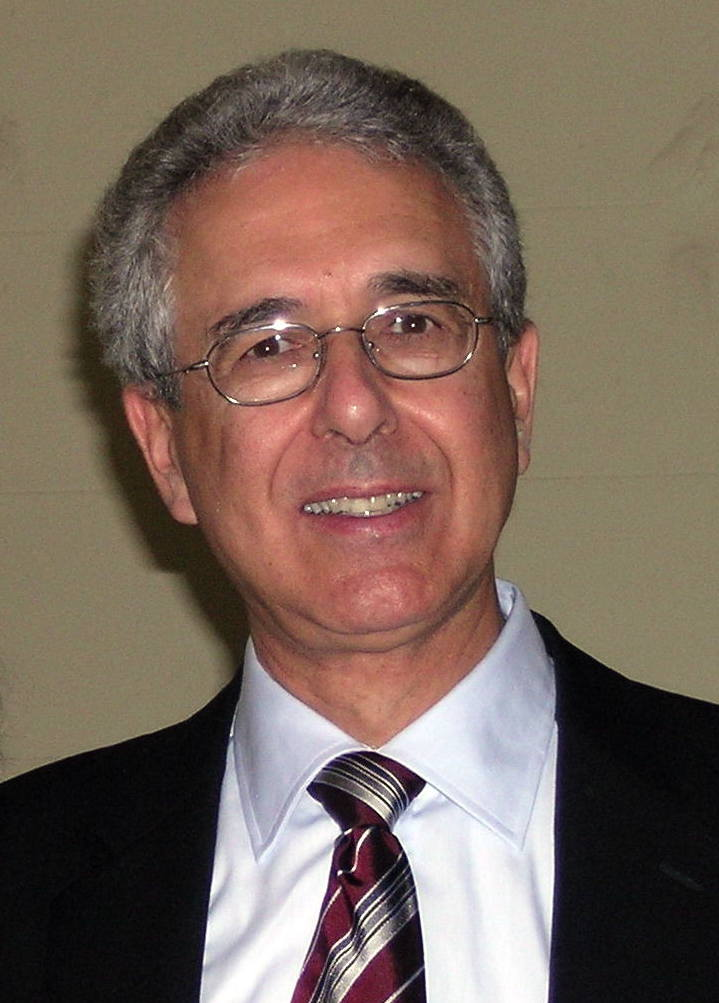
- Guinovart in 2006
- Born: 3 July 1947; Tarragona, Catalonia, Spain
- Died: 1 January 2025 (aged 77); Barcelona, Catalonia, Spain
- Education: University of Barcelona (Doctorate in Pharmacy, 1969).
- Known for: Research on glycogen; service to FEBS and IUBMB
- Spouse: Rosa Florensa
- Children: 1 daughter, Caterina
- Awards: Diplôme d'Honneur of FEBS (2007), IUBMB Distinguished Service Award (2021), FEBS Israel Pecht Award (2024)
- Scientific career
- Fields: Biochemistry
- Institutions: University of Virginia (post-doctoral research; Prínceps d'Espanya Hospital, Bellvitge; Social Security Clinical Analysis Service; University of Barcelona, Autonomous University of Barcelona; University of California, San Francisco; Institute for Research in Biomedicine, Barcelona
- Doctoral students: Joan Massagué

Joan Josep Guinovart Cirera (3 July 1947 – 1 January 2025) was a Spanish biochemist known for research on glycogen and liver glycogen synthase, as well as for work in FEBS, IUBMB and the Spanish Society of Biochemistry and Molecular Biology.

== Personal life ==
Joan Guinovart was born on 3 July 1947 in Tarragona, Spain and died on 1 January 2025 in Barcelona. He was married to Rosa-Francisca Florensa. They lived in Barcelona, with frequent visits to a house designed and built for them in 2010 in Canejan, Val d'Aran, close to the border with France. Their daughter Caterina is a biomedical researcher on malaria at the ISGlobal institute.

== Education ==
Guinovart qualified in pharmacy and chemical sciences at the University of Barcelona in 1969, and was awarded a doctorate in pharmacy by the same university in 1973. He then spent the years 1974–1975 as a post-doctoral fellow in the department of pharmacology of the University of Virginia. There he encountered a scientific environment in which young researchers were encouraged to think for themselves, in contrast to the culture of obedience that he had known before.

== Career ==
Guinovart started his career as assistant professor of clinical biochemistry at the Prínceps d'Espanya Hospital in Bellvitge (1978–1980). He became chief of the clinical analysis service of the Social Security (1980–1985). He was assistant professor (later full professor) of biochemistry at the Faculty of Pharmacy of the University of Barcelona (1975–1983) and at the Faculty of Veterinary Medicine of the Autonomous University of Barcelona (1983–1985).

He held the chairs of biochemistry and molecular biology at the Autonomous University of Barcelona from 1986 to 1990, and the University of Barcelona from 1990, and was the director of the Department of Biochemistry and Molecular Biology at the University of Barcelona from 1995 to 2001.

During his teaching career Guinovart supervised many doctoral students, beginning with Joan Massagué, Fàtima Bosch and Carlos Ciudad.

From 1992 to 1993 he was visiting professor at the Department of Biochemistry and Biophysics at the University of California, San Francisco.

In 2001–2002 he was director general of the Barcelona Science Park, where he created the Institute for Research in Biomedicine (IRB Barcelona) in 2005, which he directed until 2018.

== Research ==
Guinovart's research was primarily concerned with glycogen, starting with a study of the effects of insulin on glycogen synthase, and leading up to a study of Lafora disease, a debilitating disease characterized by accumulation of abnormal glycogen and amyotrophic lateral sclerosis, another debilitating disease, where, in a mouse model, glycongen possibly modulated progression. In relation to the mouse model, he and his co-workers found that glycogen α particles still form in mouse liver in the absence of glycogenin, following an earlier study of fatigue in mice.

Earlier papers include a study of the relationship between diabetes and testicular function, suppression of glycogen synthesis in neurons, a guideline for statistical analysis of data from metabolomics, the effect of hypoxia on glycogen accumulation, and the control of glycogen synthesis by translocation of glucokinase.

== Service to international unions and scientific societies ==
Guinovart was president of the Spanish Society of Biochemistry and Molecular Biology (SEBBM) from 1996 to 2000, and in this capacity he presided over the organizing committee of the FEBS Congress in Barcelona in 1996. He was a member of executive committee of FEBS from 1997 to 2005. He was president of the IUBMB from 2015 to 2018, and president of the Confederation of Scientific Societies of Spain (COSCE) from 2005 to 2011.

He was the founding editor-in-chief of the magazine SEBBM, and editor of IUBMB Life, and was a regular contributor to La Vanguardia, the leading newspaper of Catalonia.

== Honours ==
Guinovart received many honours and awards during his career, starting with the Leandre Cervera Prize of the Catalan Society of Biology (1979 and 1985), and the Narcís Monturiol Prize of the Generalitat of Catalonia (1999). He received the medal of the Spanish Society of Biochemistry and Molecular Biology as an Honorary Member. In 2021 he received the IUBMB Distinguished Service Award. After a lifetime of "contribution to the molecular biosciences community" FEBS in 2024 awarded him the first Israel Pecht Award. He had previously received the Diplôme d'Honneur of FEBS in 2007.

In 2005 he was elected as a Corresponding Member of the Chilean Academy of Sciences (the photograph at the beginning of this article was taken at the time of his admission), in 2006 to the Royal Academy of Pharmacy of Spain, and in 2011 to the Academia Europaea.
