= Jesús Jiménez =

Jesús Jiménez may refer to:

- Jesús Jiménez (boxer) (born 1984), Mexican boxer
- Jesús Jiménez (footballer) (born 1993), Spanish footballer
- Jesús Jiménez Barbero (born 1960), Spanish scientist
- Jesús Jiménez Zamora (1823–1897), President of Costa Rica
