= José María Troya Linero =

Spanish computer scientist

- Born: November 26, 1952; Olvera, Cádiz, Spain
- Died: April 6, 2016 (aged 63); Málaga, Spain
- Education: Complutense University of Madrid
- Awards: SISTEDES Award (2009); Aritmel Award (2012)
- Scientific career
- Fields: Software engineering; Distributed computing
- Workplaces: Complutense University of Madrid; University of Málaga

José María Troya Linero (26 November 1952 – 6 April 2016) was a Spanish computer scientist and university professor. He received a degree in Physical Sciences, specializing in computing, from the Complutense University of Madrid in 1974, and a PhD from the same university in 1980. He held several academic positions there and was a profesor titular (associate professor) in the Department of Computer Science and Automation at the Faculty of Physical Sciences from 1984 to 1988.

In 1989, he joined the University of Málaga, where he worked until his death. At the university, he founded the Software Engineering Group (GISUM), which he subsequently headed. This group developed research activities in areas including computer security, cloud computing, mobile communications, big data, embedded systems, optimization algorithms and aspect-oriented systems. He played an important role in the development of computer science education and research in Málaga.

== Research ==
Troya's research focused mainly on software engineering and distributed computing, although he also worked in other areas of computer science, including algorithms, computer security and mobile communications. His early research addressed parallel and distributed implementations of algorithms. His later work dealt with programming languages, programming technologies and software engineering for distributed systems. He was one of the founders of the Jornadas de Ingeniería del Software, which later merged with the Jornadas de Bases de Datos to form JISBD.

His publications covered software engineering, distributed systems, programming languages and related areas. He participated as a researcher in more than twenty research projects, including several European projects, and served as principal investigator in many of them. At the University of Málaga, he supervised 18 doctoral theses between 1989 and 2016.

== University administration ==
Troya held a number of administrative positions at the University of Málaga and in national research programs. At the university, he served as head of the Department of Computer Science and Programming Languages from its creation to 1999, vice-rector for Campus and Infrastructure from 1998 to 2003, director of the School of Computer Science and Engineering from 2004 to 2012, and director of the Ada Byron Research Center from 2012 to 2016.

At the national level, he was manager of the National Program for Information Technologies within Spain's National R&D Plan from 2004 to 2006 and coordinator of the monitoring committee for the ICT program of the Spanish Foundation for Science and Technology (FECYT) from 2005 to 2007.

== Technology transfer ==
Troya served as principal investigator in more than forty projects in areas including critical systems for the nuclear and aeronautical sectors, computer security and environmental management.

He was a member of advisory bodies associated with organizations including the Corporación Tecnológica de Andalucía and CETaqua Andalucía. He was also a founding partner of the spin-off company Software for Critical Systems (Softcrits), of which he served as president.

== Awards and honors ==
Troya received several awards during his career, including:

- CITEMA Foundation Award for doctoral theses in Computer Science, Madrid, 1981
- Día de Andalucía Award for research, Government Delegation of the Regional Government of Andalusia, Málaga, 2008
- SISTEDES Award for contributions to Software Development Technologies, 2009.
- City of Málaga Award for Innovation and New Technologies, Málaga City Council, 2010
- National Computer Science Award, Aritmel Award of the Spanish Computer Science Society, 2012

== Legacy ==
Plaque dedicated to Troya at the School of Computer Science and Engineering of the University of Málaga

Troya contributed to the design of the computing degree programs introduced at the University of Málaga as part of the Bologna Process reforms. A plaque beneath an olive tree at the entrance to the School of Computer Science and Engineering was installed in his memory.

He also promoted the transformation of GISUM into a research institute devoted to software engineering and technology. The University of Málaga's Institute for Software Engineering and Software Technology "José María Troya Linero" (ITIS) bears his name.
