= Institute of Mathematical Sciences =

Institute of Mathematical Sciences may refer to:

- Institute of Mathematical Sciences, Chennai, a research institute in Chennai, India
- Institute of Mathematical Sciences (Spain)
- Courant Institute School of Mathematics, Computing, and Data Science, New York, also known as Courant Institute of Mathematical Sciences
