= CERCA Institute =

Spanish group of centres of excellence

Research Centers of Catalonia
- Centres de Recerca de Catalunya

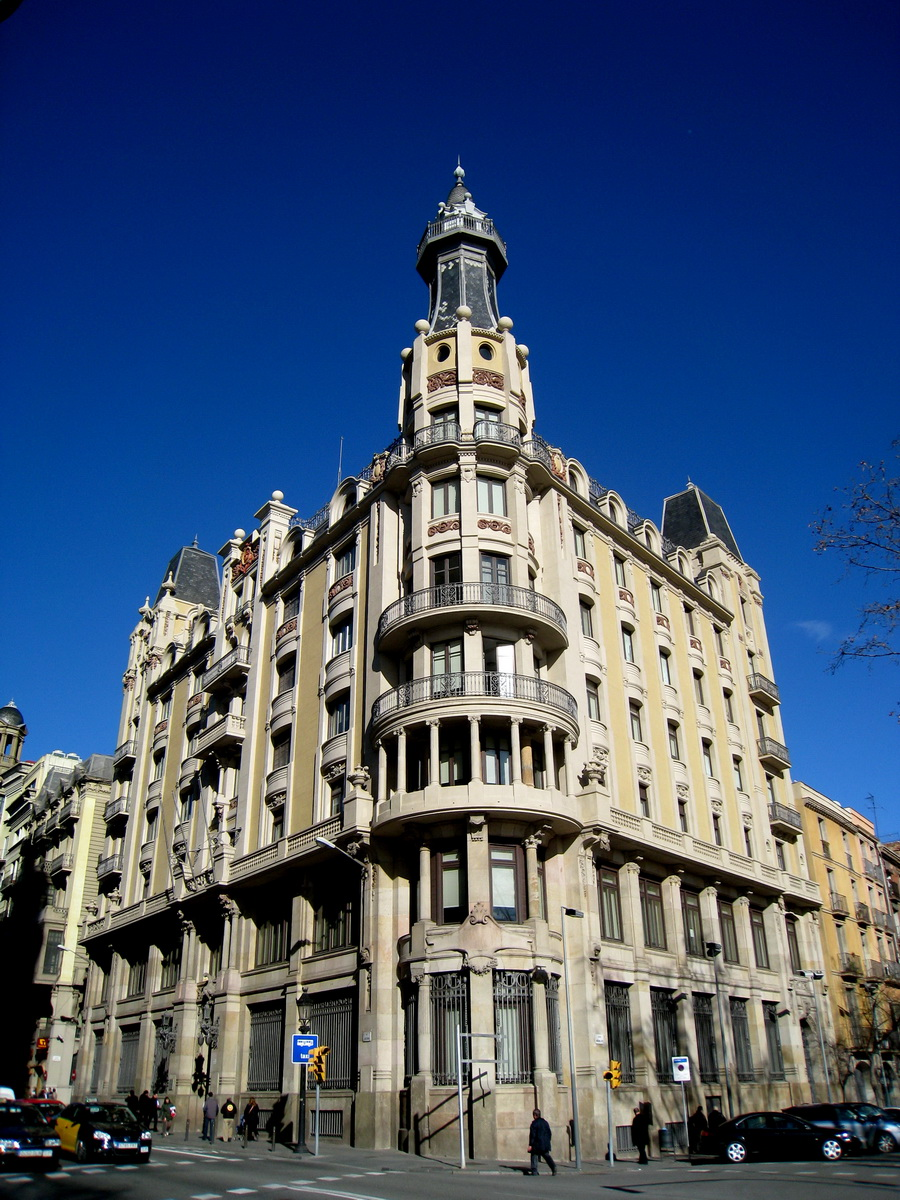
- CERCA Headquarters. Transmediteranea building
- Abbreviation: CERCA
- Formation: 16 June 2010 (16 years ago)
- Type: Foundation (nonprofit)
- Headquarters: Via Laietana, 2. 08003 Barcelona, Catalonia 41°22′55.28″N 2°10′53.63″E
- Region served: Catalonia
- Director: Laia Pellejà i Puxeu
- Parent organization: Departament de Recerca i Universitats
- Website: http://cerca.cat/en/

Centres de Recerca de Catalunya (CERCA; English: Research Centers of Catalonia) is the corporative denomination of a group of centers of excellence based in Catalonia, Spain, called CERCA Centers, and the institution that coordinates them, called CERCA or I-CERCA.

Its fundamental aim is to secure the development of the Catalan research centers system; favoring and maximizing the synergies, the coordination among the centers and the strategic cooperation; improving the positioning, the visibility and the impact of the research carried out by these centers and facilitating its interlocution with the different public and private agents. CERCA's character is multidisciplinary and includes 40 research centers mainly based in the area of Barcelona.

== History ==
The origin of CERCA goes back to the CERCA program, launched in 2005 by the General Direction of Research of the Government of Catalonia with the aim of promoting the activities of the Catalan research centers existent at that time: the Institute of Agriculture and Food Research and Technology (IRTA), the Center for Demographic Studies (CED), the International Centre for Numerical Methods in Engineering (CIMNE), the Centre for Mathematical Research (CRM), the Institute of High Energy Physics (IFAE), among others. These institutions of research, which had diverse institutional composition, were endowed with some general guidelines of joint performance and visibility that could generate economies of scale. Its coordination favored a major impact of its scientific and technological outputs.

The foundational program kept on accommodating the centers of research created from the year 2000 as, for example, the Centre for Genomic Regulation (CRG), the Institute for Research in Biomedicine (IRB), the Institute of Photonic Sciences (ICFO) or the Institute of Chemical Research of Catalonia (ICIQ).

To continue and to promote the dynamics of collaboration and sinergy, in the year 2010 the Institute Foundation of the Research Centers of Catalonia (CERCA Institution or I-CERCA) is created by governmental agreement with the objective of giving support to the scientific and corporative projection of all CERCA centers in order to increase its positions of leadership in the international area.

The idea of associating some centers of research, while maintaining its functional autonomy, is attributed to the economist and politician Andreu Mas-Colell, former responsible for the Department of Universities and Research. Mas-Colell foresaw the need of devising a framework for overcoming the institutional difficulties at that moment. At the same time it had to facilitate the promotion of the high level research, increasing the critical mass of the centers and facilitating the attraction of scientific talent.

== The institution ==
The CERCA institution is a foundation of the public sector, in which the Government of Catalonia has a major holding. It has its office headquarters in Via Laietana, 2, of Barcelona, in the Transmediterranea building, designed by the architect Juli Maria Fossas i Martínez. The Foundation is governed by a board of trustees, presided by the Minister of the Catalan Government responsible for research matters, and integrated by members who represent the main Ministries of the Catalan administration. It has a delegated Commission and a Director and it is entered in the Register of Foundations of Government of Catalonia with register number 2648.

=== Functions ===
According to the statutes of CERCA approved on 16 June 2010, the performance of the institution has the following specific objectives and functions:

- Contributing to the international presence of the centers of research of the Government of Catalonia.
- Facilitating and promoting the adoption of joint policies in research management, scientific development and knowledge transfer, identifying and using the synergies and the economies of scale.
- Promoting the cooperation and the scientific exchange of the research centers with the best centers and universities from all over the world. Promoting at the same time the interdisciplinary research, the coordinated transversal programs, the mobility of the researchers and the attraction and retention of international talent.
- Increasing and facilitating the knowledge transfer from to the entrepreneurial sector and to the society. Also, supporting, advising and boosting spin-off company creation from patents or from results generated.
- Promoting the economic and entrepreneurial sectors implication, and the society commitment with the centers of research.

=== Practice and performance ===
The scientific policy in relation to the CERCA Centers has been developed in a frame of political consensus and of institutional collaboration, especially with other research institutions, such as universities and hospitals, which has promoted the creation of win-win synergies. The Catalan government funds approximately 25% of the total budget of the CERCA Centers. The rest of the budget comes from the participating institutions, competitive projects, private contracts or activities of patronage.

The scientific results of the CERCA Centers along these years have been heterogeneous, but remarkable. During the period 2012-2014 the CERCA centers have published almost 20,000 articles in magazines included in the Web of Science. And 1116 articles have received the consideration of "highly cited". The ratio of co-authorships with a foreign author has reach 53% and only 9.2% of the articles have never received any citation. The index of relative quotation impact (RCI) -that relates the number of cites obtained compared with other articles of the same magazine and year- is 2.5. That is twice and a half above the medium citation.

Another measure of the excellence of the CERCA Centers are the 120 grant programs of research by the European Board of Research (ERC), in its several modalities (Starting, Consolidator, Advanced, Prove of Concept i Synergy) obtained during these years. In addition to that, over 65% of the centers are Coordinators for the European Union H2020 projects.

CERCA has promoted the obtention by its centers of the recognition HRS4R issued by the initiative Euraxess of the European Commission. Nowadays, 26 of the CERCA centers have obtained this recognition. In the year 2014 CERCA adhered all its centers to the Charter & Code d'Euraxess. Later on CERCA contributed that by2017, 30 centers have obtained the HR Excellence logo.

== CERCA Centers ==
The CERCA Centers are public or private institutions based in Catalonia dedicated to research. In order to become a CERCA Center, the institutions have to fulfill a series of conditions that guarantee the quality of its performance and the excellence of its scientific results. Among others, they need to have its own legal status, they must be a non-profit-making body and must have been created or participated by the Catalan administration.

=== Terms and Conditions ===
The research institution that wishes to become a CERCA Center has to overcome a scientific evaluation carried out by an external committee. The official recognition is awarded by the Ministry responsible for research matters, after overcoming the initial evaluation favorably and of checking out that the conditions related to its juridical status and the results of their scientific activities are fulfilled.

Specifically, els CERCA Centers have to:

- Be an independent organization with its own legal status, participated by the Government of Catalonia, which aims at the scientific research excellence.
- Apply a model of private management with maximum flexibility and maximum self-commitment, on the basis of a pluriannual program of activities, in the form of a strategic plan and an ex-post evaluation that respects the autonomy of every center.
- Have a hierarchized and effective governance, based on a direction with extense powers that derive from the government organ before they are responsible for.
- Have a research staff dimensioned for having an international impact and being structured by groups of research directed by international scientists of outstanding prestige and with rotation of postdoctoral researchers.
- Develop cutting-edge research oriented to the scientific and economic impact and the improvement of the individual and social welfare.
- Access to "significant and stable structural funding" through contracts with the Government of Catalonia. Also, they have to apply an attractive talent policy on the basis of a definition of the scientific career of its research staff, in accordance with the peculiarities of each field and the strategies of recruitment chosen by each center.
- Be advised and periodically evaluated by an international and external high level scientific committee. This committee must ensure the application of practices and criteria in accordance with the international standards of excellence in the research field.

=== List of the Centers ===
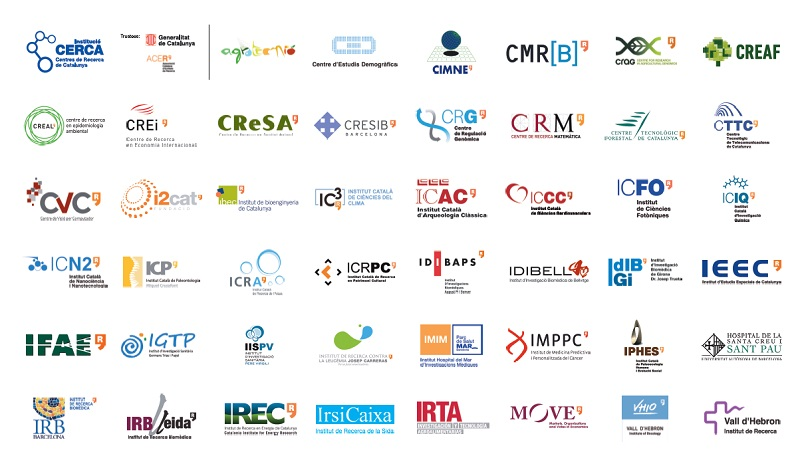
CERCA Centers

The list of CERCA Centers has grown over the years. They cover all the scientific disciplines and are distributed all over the Catalan territory, although many of them are based in Barcelona and linked with the universities and other research institutions.

Regarding their number, the following 40 institutions have successfully passed the initial assessment and are considered CERCA centers for all purposes:

- Agrotecnio – Centre for Research in Agrotechnology
- CED – Center for Demographic Studies
- CIMNE – International Centre for Numerical Methods in Engineering
- CMR[B] – Center of Regenerative Medicine in Barcelona
- CRAG – Center for Research in Agricultural Genomics
- CREAF – Centre for Ecological Research and Forestry Applications
- CREI – Centre for Research in International Economics
- CRG – Center for Genomic Regulation
- CRM – Center for Mathematical Research
- CTFC – Forest Sciences Centre of Catalonia
- CTTC – Telecommunications Technological Center of Catalonia
- CVC – Computer Vision Center
- i2CAT – Internet and Digital Innovation in Catalonia
- IBEC – Institute for Bioengineering of Catalonia
- ICAC – Catalan Institute of Classical Archaeology
- ICFO – Institute of Photonic Sciences
- ICIQ – Institute of Chemical Research of Catalonia
- ICN2 – Catalan Institute of Nanoscience and Nanotechnology
- ICP – Catalan Institute of Palaeontology Miquel Crusafont
- ICRA – Catalan Institute for Water Research
- ICRPC – Catalan Institute for Cultural Heritage Research
- IDIBAPS – August Pi i Sunyer Biomedical Research Institute
- IDIBELL – Bellvitge Biomedical Research Institute
- IDIBGI – Girona Biomedical Research Institute
- IEEC – Institute of Space Studies of Catalonia
- IFAE – Institute for High Energy Physics
- IGTP – Health Sciences Research Institute of the Germans Trias i Pujol Foundation
- IISPV – Pere Virgili Health Research Institute
- IJC – Josep Carreras Leukemia Research Institute
- IMIM – Hospital del Mar Medical Research Institute
- IPHES – Catalan Institute for Human Palaeoecology and Social Evolution
- IR-Sant Pau – Sant Pau Institute of Biomedical Research
- IRB Barcelona – Institute for Research in Biomedicine
- IRB Lleida – Biomedical Research Institute of Lleida
- IREC – Catalonia Institute for Energy Research
- IrsiCaixa – Institute for AIDS Research
- IRTA – Institute of Agrifood Research and Technology
- ISGLOBAL – Barcelona Centre for International Health Research
- VHIO – Vall d'Hebron Institute of Oncology
- VHIR – Vall d'Hebron Research Institute

== Activities ==
Each one of the CERCA Centers has total autonomy in its scientific and technological performances. However CERCA has the mission of ensuring a suitable development of the Catalan research centers system, encouraging and to maximizing the synergies, coordinating among centers and the strategic cooperation, improving the positioning, the visibility and the impact of the research carried out and facilitating the interlocution with the different public and private actors involved.

These synergies have resulted in a series of shared performances regarding the research evaluation, the transfer of knowledge, the management and structuring of the centers and other programs in order to achieve a greater visibility in society of the search results by the agents implicated.

=== Organizational, administrative and economic advice ===
The main function of the CERCA Institution is to provide coverage to the aspects related to the organization of CERCA Centers, its economic supervision and economic control, to study the legal aspects and to make follow-up with the activity of the centers and its contract programmes with the Government of Catalonia.

The juridical area of I-CERCA carries out technical tasks of secretary's office and/or of juridical support in 20 government organs of CERCA Centers. These bodies have different denominations depending on its legal form. The activity includes the prior advice to the calls and the elaboration of the agendas, as well as the assistance to the bodies of governance and delegation meetings, if this is the case. The CERCA Juridical Commission, with the participation of the juridical staff of the CERCA Centers, meets at least twice a year to analyse the application of the approved provisions by the centers.

The Economic Department analyses the economic documentation of the centers and advises them about its economic-financial and patrimonial situation. The I-CERCA organizational and administrative support also offers coverage to the Centers for the processes of selection and incorporation of new directors and for the organization of specific workshops.

=== Research evaluation ===
The scientific evaluation is one of the main activities coordinated and promoted by i-CERCA. The centers must undergo a complete scientific evaluation by an external body to obtain the recognition as a CERCA Center. And periodically have to undergo an external scientific evaluation (every 4 or 5 years), in accordance with the international scientific quality standards.

The evaluation is carried out in line with the principles of transparency, externality and independence. An international committee formed by independent experts of recognized prestige and appointed by each one of the CERCA Centers, visits the headquarters of the center, interviews the persons in charge and assess the compliance with the objectives for the last three years of activity. In particular assess the scientific output, the transfer of results, the recruitment of researchers, the administrative management and the visibility and impact of the scientific results.

The committee of evaluation elaborates an executive report with recommendations that have to be implemented in a five-year period. Each center obtains an alphabetical valuation (A, B, C, D) according to their performance. The valuation can affect the funding of the center and its own feasibility.

The CERCA Centers were evaluated for the first time during the 2012-2013 period; a second general evaluation of all the centers was carried out for the 2016-2018 period.

=== Transfer of knowledge ===
The trajectory of the CERCA Centers has been particularly noteworthy in terms of scientific output. Even though, the transfer of knowledge has traditionally been one of the major shortcomings of the Catalan system of science and technology. Because of that, I-CERCA acts as a platform of promotion for all CERCA Centers, aware of the need to coordinate efforts in the transfer of knowledge field.

==== GINJOL ====
I-CERCA has promoted several actions in the field of subject of transfer of results, among which the program GÍNJOL stands out. GINJOL is patents data base intended to promote the protection of the intellectual and industrial property of the research centers results.

==== Pioneer Awards ====
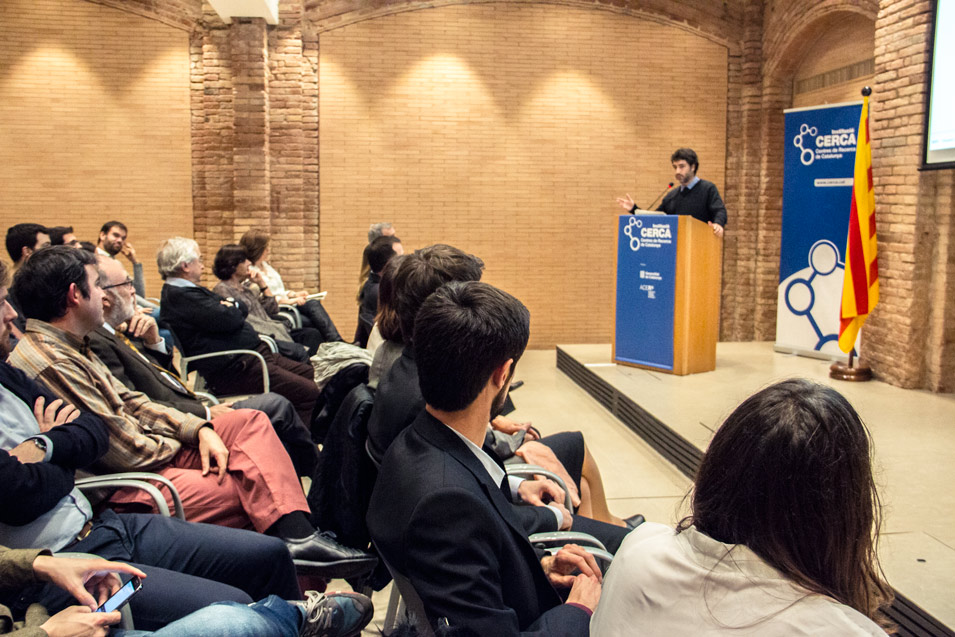
Presentation ceremony of the 2015 Pioneer Awards

CERCA promotes the Pioneer Awards annually, to recognize researchers at CERCA Centres who, in the last 18 months, have defended a doctoral thesis that has a clear orientation towards launching or strengthening a technology or product of industrial or commercial interest or that can make a significant contribution to the development of public policies.

=== SUMA (Program for Integration of CERCA Centers) ===
CERCA has promoted the program SUMA intended to encourage projects directed at increasing the critical mass and the CERCA Centers competitiveness. The final objective of this program is to attain integrated structures and increase the scientific competitiveness. As a result of this work, the CERCA Centers have gone from 47 structures in 2011 to 40 in 2017

=== Woman and science ===
I-CERCA wants to promote the presence of women in the highest positions in science given that at present these charges are not occupied by women according to the number of qualified women. Because of that, CERCA has incorporated specific measures to favor the introduction of the gender perspective in the excellence research centers in Catalonia. The action with more international visibility has been a video produced by CERCA destined to avoiding unintentional gender bias in the selection process of investigators.

I-CERCA has a specific advising commission for the diversity to discuss and to propose tools and specific measures addressed to suppress these biases and barriers that prevent from wasting this highly qualified human capital.
