= Guinovart =

Guinovart (pronounced ɣinuˈβart in Central Catalan) is a Catalan surname. Notable people with the surname include:

- Albert Guinovart (born 1962), Catalan composer and pianist
- Joan Guinovart (1947–2025), Spanish biochemist
- Josep Guinovart (1927–2007), Spanish Catalan painter
