= Núria López Bigas =

Researcher on computational cancer genomics

Núria López-Bigas
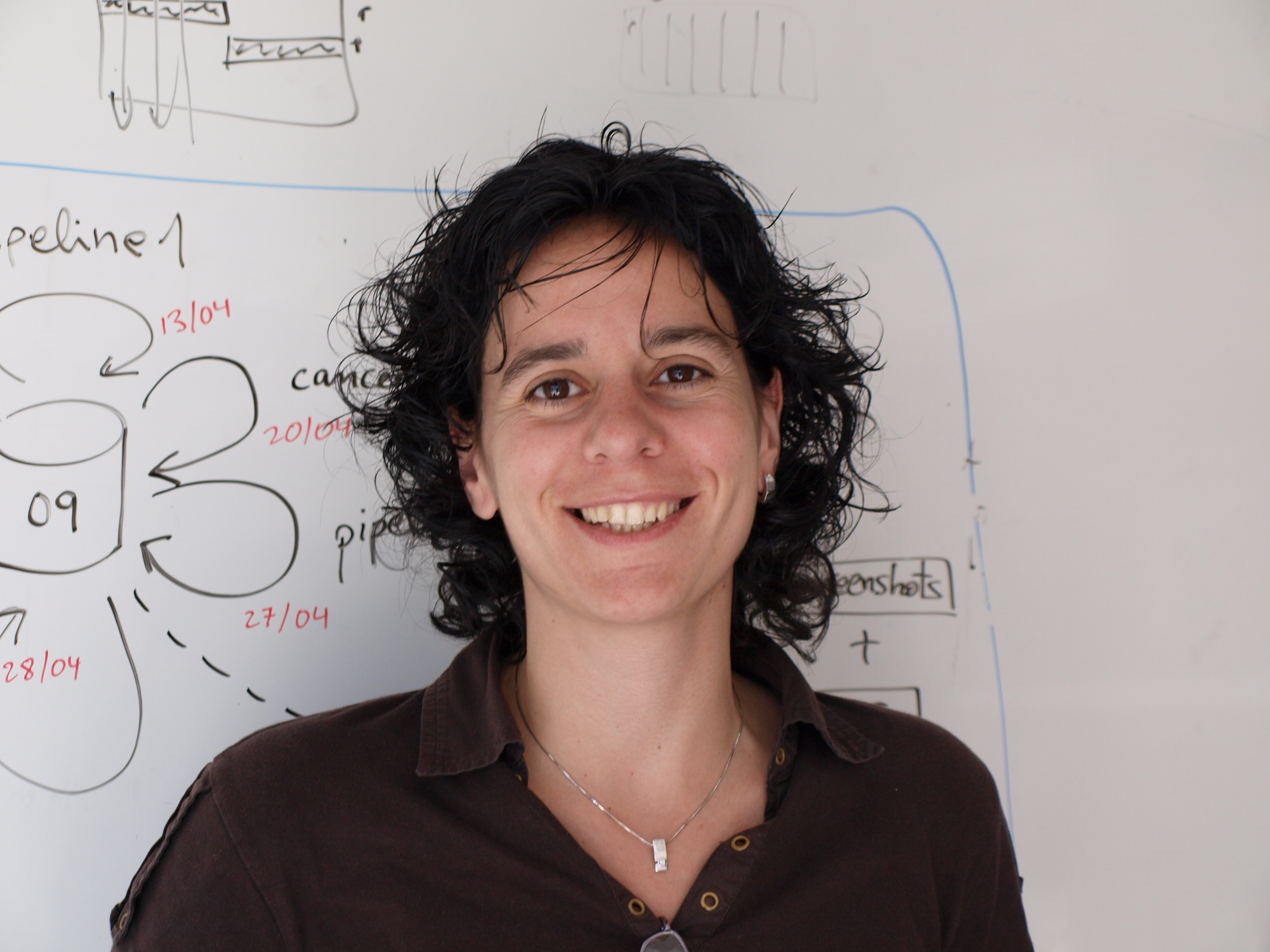
- Born: Núria López Bigas; 1975 (age 50–51); Monistrol de Montserrat (Barcelona), Spain
- Education: University of Barcelona
- Scientific career
- Workplaces: Pompeu Fabra University; Institute for Research in Biomedicine

Núria López Bigas is a Spanish biologist and research professor with expertise in medical genetics, computational biology, and bioinformatics. She is an ICREA (Catalan Institution for Research and Advanced Studies) professor at Pompeu Fabra University and she also leads the Biomedical Genomics Research Group at the Institute for Research in Biomedicine in Barcelona, Spain. Her research is focused on developing computational approaches to investigate cancer genomes.

== Education and early research ==
López-Bigas received her Ph.D. in biology from the University of Barcelona. Her Ph.D. work consisted of studying the molecular causes of hereditary deafness in Dr. Xavier Estivill's laboratory. She then moved to Cambridge, UK where she worked on computational genomics at the European Bioinformatics Institute in Christos A. Ouzounis's group. When she moved back to Barcelona, she was involved in the pilot phase of the ENCODE project at the Centre for Genomic Regulation. In April 2006, López-Bigas joined Pompeu Fabra University and was appointed an ICREA research professor in 2011. In 2016, her lab moved to the Institute for Research in Biomedicine where she leads the Biomedical Genomics Research Group.

== Genomic research projects and contributions ==
López-Bigas' lab has contributed to the identification of genes that drive abnormal growth of malignant cells, known as cancer driver genes. During tumorigenesis, positive selection of mutations that activate the tumorigenic potential of oncogenes occur. Her lab has developed computational methodologies to detect these signals of positive selection in the pattern of somatic mutations observed in tumors. They developed pioneer methods to identify cancer driver genes through the creation of IntOGen. This web platform supports cancer researchers by providing a systematic analysis of oncogene data across various sequencing projects to aid in clinical decision-making. The lab is also involved in advancing precision medicine by using targetable gene alterations to help determine therapeutic options for cancer patients. They have developed an approach that uses bioinformatic resources to identify therapeutically actionable genomic alterations in tumors, which is accessible through another online database called the Cancer Genome Interpreter.

She has also published over 100 papers in her line of work.

== Professional affiliations and awards ==
López-Bigas has been awarded several scholarships, prizes, and awards. Most recently, she won the XI Banco Sabadell Foundation Award for Biomedical Research. 50,000 euros is awarded to an individual who has developed a career in Spain as a promising scientist, and López-Bigas was recognized for her contributions to the development of new bioinformatics methods to study cancer genomes. Amongst other awards, she has also received the Proffered Paper Award in 2014 at the European Association for Cancer Research meeting and the Catalan National Award for Young Research Talent in 2012. In 2021, she was elected as a Fellow of the International Society for Computational Biology.

== See also ==
- Oncogenomics
- Linker histone H1 variants
