= Open access in Spain =

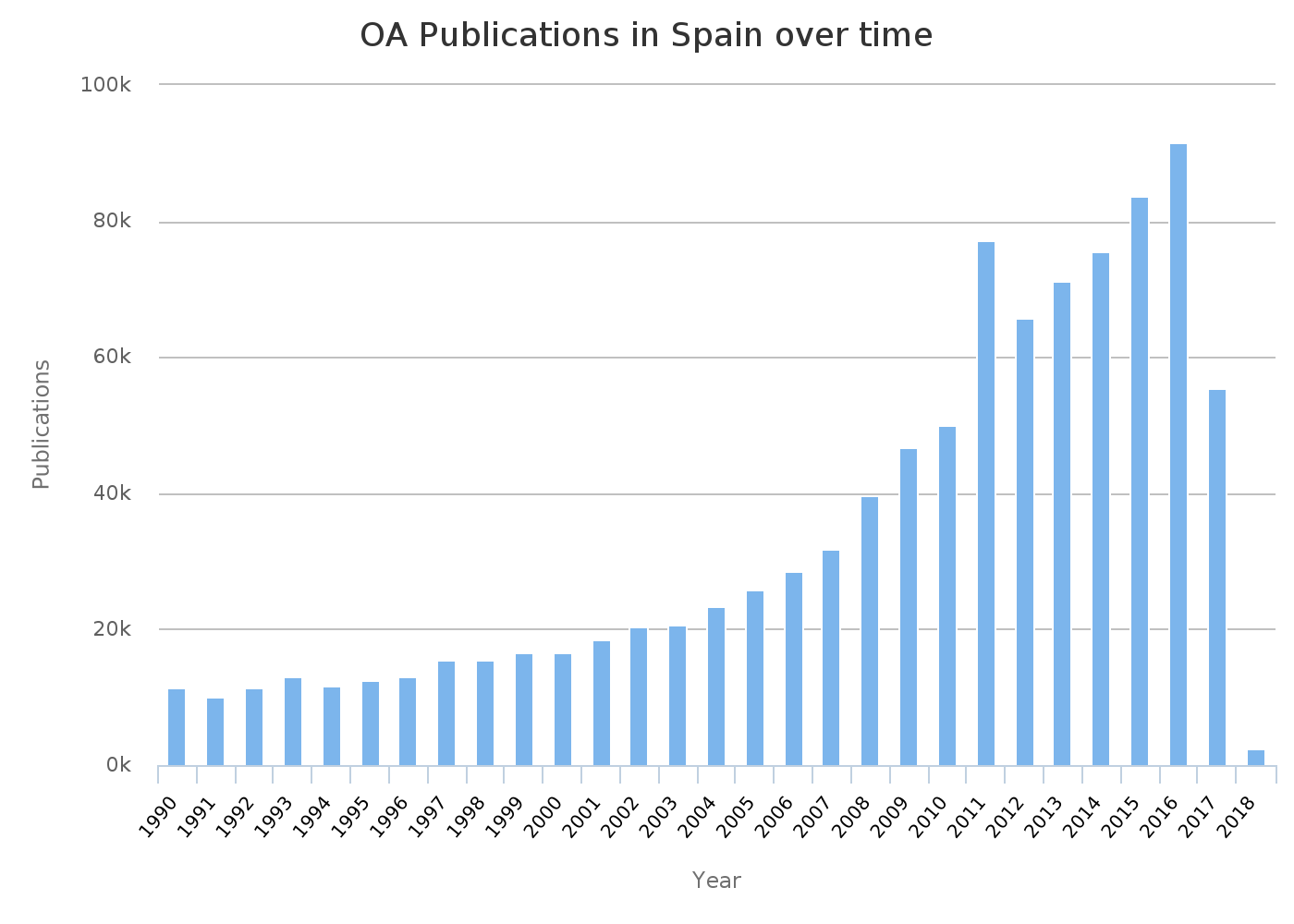
Growth of open access publications in Spain, 1990–2018

Open access in Spain is defined by the national 2011 "Ley de la Ciencia, la Tecnología y la Innovación" (Science, Technology and Innovation Act) requires open access publishing for research that has been produced with public funding. The first peer-reviewed open access Spanish journal, Relieve, began in 1995. Publishers CSIC Press and Hipatia Press belong to the international Open Access Scholarly Publishers Association.

== Repositories ==
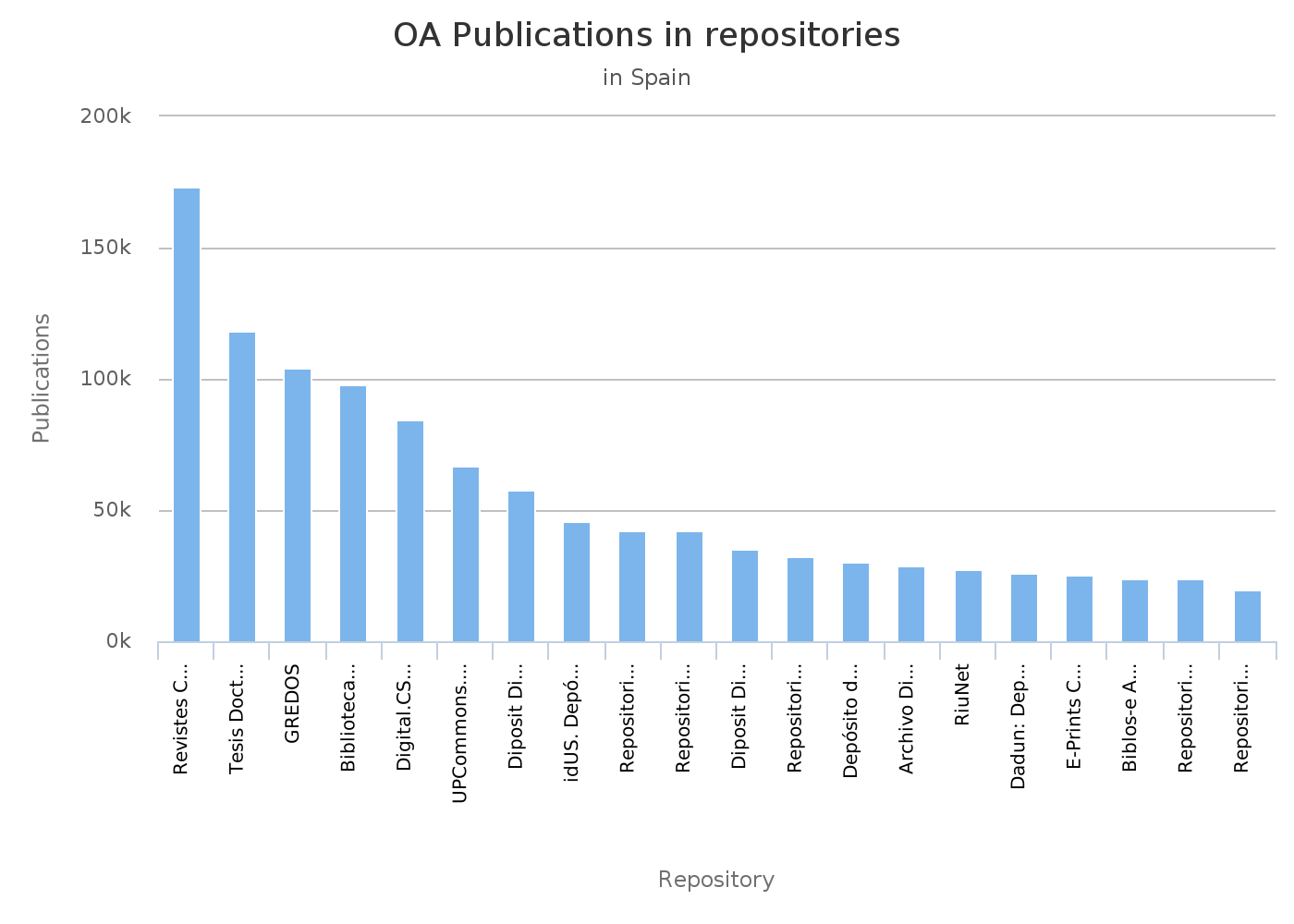
Number of open access publications in various Spanish repositories, 2018

There are a number of collections of scholarship in Spain housed in digital open access repositories. They contain journal articles, book chapters, data, and other research outputs that are free to read. As of March 2018, the UK-based Directory of Open Access Repositories lists some 131 repositories in Spain. Those with the most digital assets include Revistes Catalanes amb Accés Obert, Tesis Doctorals en Xarxa, GREDOS (of Universidad de Salamanca), Biblioteca Virtual del Patrimonio Bibliográfico (of Ministry of Culture), and Digital CSIC (of Spanish National Research Council). Related to this are SciELO and DialNet.

Most universities in Spain maintain an institutional repository, collectively searchable via the "Recolecta" digital platform.

== See also ==
- Copyright law of Spain
- Education in Spain
- Internet in Spain
- List of libraries in Spain
- Media of Spain
- Open access in other countries
- Redalyc (Red de Revistas Científicas de América Latina y El Caribe, España y Portugal)
- Science and technology in Spain
