= Institute of Mathematical Sciences (Spain) =

Research institute affiliated to the CSIC

Coordinates: 40.5494°N 3.6871°W

- Instituto de Ciencias Matemáticas

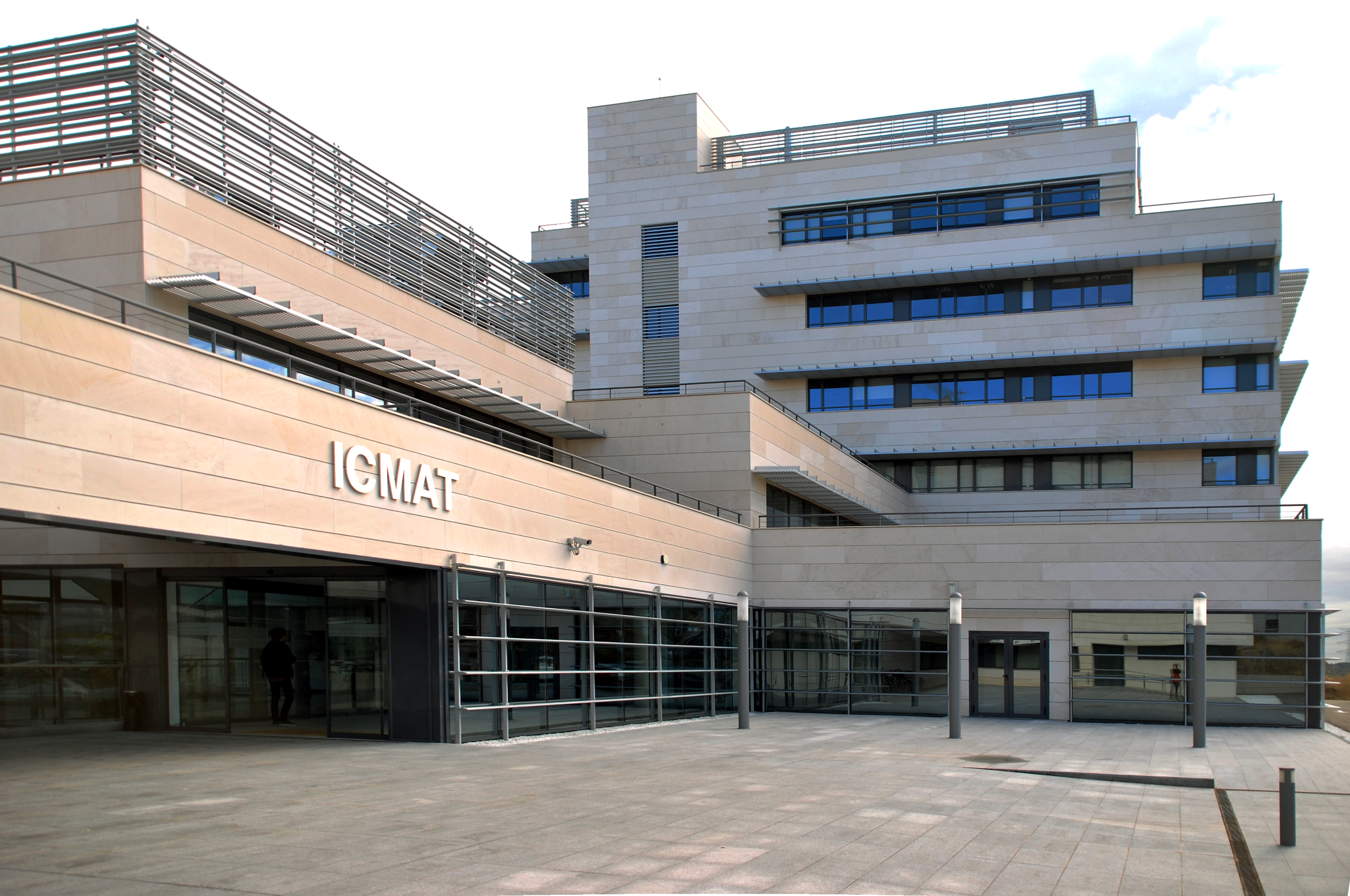
- Abbreviation: ICMAT
- Formation: 2010
- Location: Cantoblanco Campus, Madrid, Spain
- Fields: Mathematics
- Parent organization: CSIC, UAM, UCM, UC3M

The Institute of Mathematical Sciences (Spanish: Instituto de Ciencias Matemáticas – ICMAT) is a mixed institute affiliated to the Spanish National Research Council (CSIC) in partnership with three public universities: the Autonomous University of Madrid (UAM), the Charles III University of Madrid (UC3M) and the Complutense University of Madrid (UCM). Founded in 2010, the ICMAT headquarters is located in the Cantoblanco Campus in Northern Madrid.

The ICMAT is composed of the mathematicians belonging to the CSIC and researchers from the three Madrid universities. The structure and composition of the center was based on an initial selection carried out with the assistance of the National Agency for Public Education (Agencia Nacional de Evaluación y Prospectiva – ANEP) after a public call issued to all interested parties.

== Research at the ICMAT ==
The ICMAT is an institute where work on a broad range of mathematics is conducted, including the transfer of knowledge and results. Initially the main fields of research are as follows: Mathematical Analysis, Differential Geometry, Algebraic Geometry, Partial Differential Equations, Fluid Mechanics, Dynamical Systems, Geometric Mechanics and Mathematical Physics. In addition to the inclusion of research lines in Number Theory, Group Theory and Combinatorics in 2011.

Among the research results obtained by researchers from the Institute that have so far had the greatest impact, it is worth mentioning the solution to the Nash problem in Singularity Theory by Javier Fernández de Bobadilla and María Pe; the solution to the Sidon problem in Number Theory by Javier Cilleruelo and Carlos Vinuesa; the solution to the Arnold conjecture in Hydrodynamics by Daniel Peralta Salas and Alberto Enciso and the construction of the mathematical model for explaining how water waves break by the research team led by Diego Córdoba.

== History of the ICMAT ==
=== Background to the ICMAT ===
The ICMAT emerged from the Department of Mathematics at the CSIC Institute of Mathematics and Fundamental Physics, to which mathematicians belonging to the CSIC were assigned. The agreement for the creation of the center was signed in November, 2007, after assessment through the 2006–2009 Strategic Plan, to which all the centers connected with the CSIC are subject and in which the international commission recommended the establishment of a separate institute.

A look back over the long history of the CSIC reveals what may be regarded as forerunners of the ICMAT: the Laboratorio Seminario Matemático of the Junta de Ampliación de Estudios (JAE) created in 1915, and the Instituto Jorge Juan de Matemáticas, created in 1939 by the CSIC.

=== The ICMAT, Severo Ochoa Center of Excellence ===
In 2011 the ICMAT was chosen as one of the eight centers of excellence in the Severo Ochoa Program call for submissions issued by the then Spanish Ministry of Science and Technology (MICYT).

Among other distinctions, six ICMAT researchers have obtained European Research Council (ERC) Starting Grants, which places the Institute in the foremost position in Europe in mathematics.

== Outreach at the ICMAT ==
Every year the ICMAT participates in the Science and Technology Week, the Science in Action competition (the ICMAT being one of the organizing institutions) and since 2012 has participated in Researchers’ Night (in collaboration with the UAM).

Furthermore, the ICMAT has launched the Matemáticas en la Residencia program (in collaboration with the Residencia de Estudiantes and the CSIC) in which international figures for the public understanding of science such as Marcus du Sautoy, Jesús María Sanz-Serna, Pierre Cartier, Guillermo Martínez, Edward Frenkel, Christiane Rousseau, Antonio Durán and John Allen Paulos have taken part, as well as the Graffiti and Maths competition, which is aimed at secondary school students. The blog Mathematics and its Frontiers has an annual readership of 150,000, in addition to the presence of the Institute in social networks: Facebook and Twitter.

In March, 2013, the ICMAT officially became a Scientific Culture Unit recognized by the FECYT (Spanish Foundation for Science and Technology), and is the only mathematical institution to enjoy this distinction.

== Location and facilities ==
=== ICMAT facilities ===
The ICMAT is located in a new building on the UAM campus and has one auditorium with a capacity for 270 people, a lecture hall that holds 140 and another that holds 80, as well as three more with a capacity of 50, 40 and 30 people, respectively. It also has a library of 1,100 square meters, a large computation area and offices for some 200 researchers. These facilities are ideal for the celebration of thematic programs, congresses, schools and seminars.

=== The ICMAT on the UAM+CSIC International Campus of Excellence ===
The ICMAT forms part of the Theoretical Physics and Mathematics strategic axis on the UAM+CSIC International Campus of Excellence.
