= The Catalan Institute for Water Research =

Spanish research institute

Catalan Institute for Water Research
- Institut Català de Recerca de l'Aigua (ICRA)
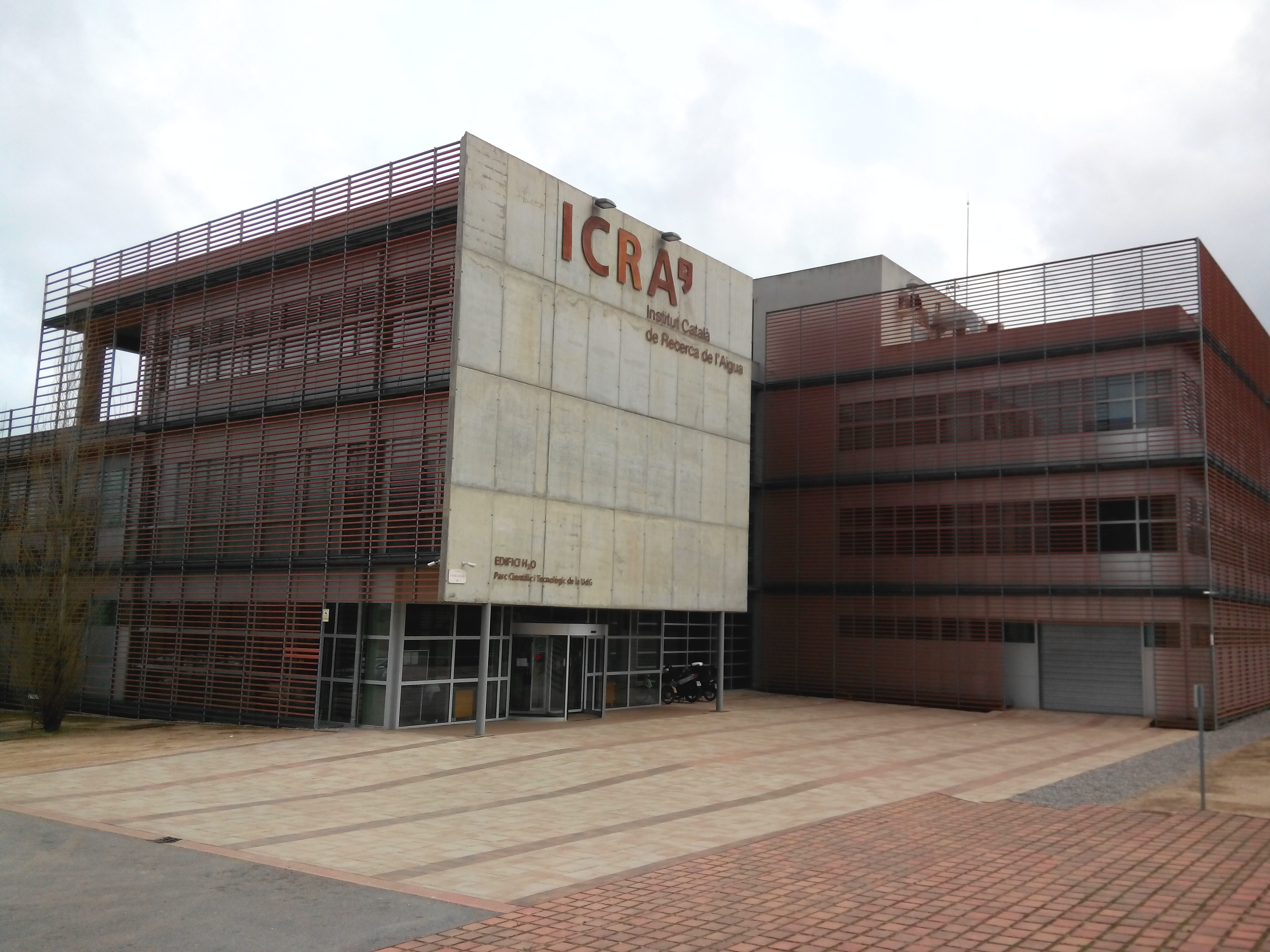
- Type: Research institute
- Established: 26 October 2006 (19 years ago)
- Administrative staff: 77
- Location: Girona, Spain
- Campus: Parc Científic i Tecnològic de la Universitat de Girona, Edifici H2O, Emili Grahit 101, 17003 Girona, Spain
- Website: www.icra.cat

The Catalan Institute for Water Research (ICRA-CERCA) (Catalan: Institut Català de Recerca de l'Aigua; Spanish: Instituto Catalán de Investigación del Agua) is a public research institute dedicated to advancing knowledge of the water cycle and promoting sustainable water management through interdisciplinary research and innovation. Based at the Parc Cientific i Tecnologic de la Universitat de Girona, ICRA was established in 2006 by the Government of Catalonia and the University of Girona. It is one of the CERCA centres, a network of publicly funded research institutes promoted by the Government of Catalonia.

ICRA conducts interdisciplinary research on water science, encompassing hydrology, aquatic ecology, environmental chemistry, microbiology, biotechnology, engineering, and environmental economics. Its research addresses a broad range of topics, including water quality, wastewater treatment, water reuse, ecosystem health, emerging contaminants, antimicrobial resistance, climate change adaptation, drought resilience, and sustainable water management, with particular attention to the impacts of human activities on aquatic ecosystems.

ICRA combines fundamental and applied research with technology transfer, innovation, and policy support. It collaborates with universities, research institutions, public administrations, industry, and international organisations at the national and international levels. Much of its work has particular relevance to Mediterranean environments, where water scarcity, drought, and climate change pose major environmental challenges.

== Research Areas ==
=== Resources and Ecosystems ===
This research area investigates the spatial and temporal dynamics of water resources and its potential effects, especially on the structure and function of continental aquatic ecosystems.

Special emphasis is given to irregularities in water resources and the effects of land use and climate change on resources and ecosystems, particularly in the Mediterranean area.

=== Water Quality & Safety ===
This research area is dedicated to offering comprehensive and effective solutions to the water quality challenges, particularly in the Mediterranean region. By assessing water quality—considering chemical, microbiological, and ecotoxicological factors—this approach identifies the essential tools for the efficient management and conservation of water bodies.

The primary objective of this area is to characterize the concentrations, fate, and mechanisms of action of chemical pollutants and waterborne pathogens, both in aquatic environments and in engineered systems, such as drinking water treatment, wastewater treatment, and reuse systems.

State-of-the-art chemical and microbiological analytical methods are being applied to assess the quality and characteristics of surface waters, groundwater, and treated water, including both drinking water sources and wastewater. The impacts of chemical and microbiological pollutants are evaluated through the One Health approach, which recognizes the interconnectedness of humans, animals, and the environment.

=== Technologies and Evaluation ===
This research area develops and evaluates methodologies and technologies for optimizing resources, energy efficiency, and cost minimization of processes related to the urban water system.

These objectives are achieved through the application of emerging, resource-optimization technologies of water supply, wastewater treatment, reclamation, and reuse. This area has an integral perspective of the integrated processes involved, from the river to human consumption and back to the system. The development of technologies is related to those best available but not entailing an excessive cost, while striving to achieve resource consumption reduction and optimization, related to water scarcity and improvement of the final product.
