= University of La Rioja =

University in Spain

Coordinates: 42.465971°N 2.426219°W

University de La Rioja
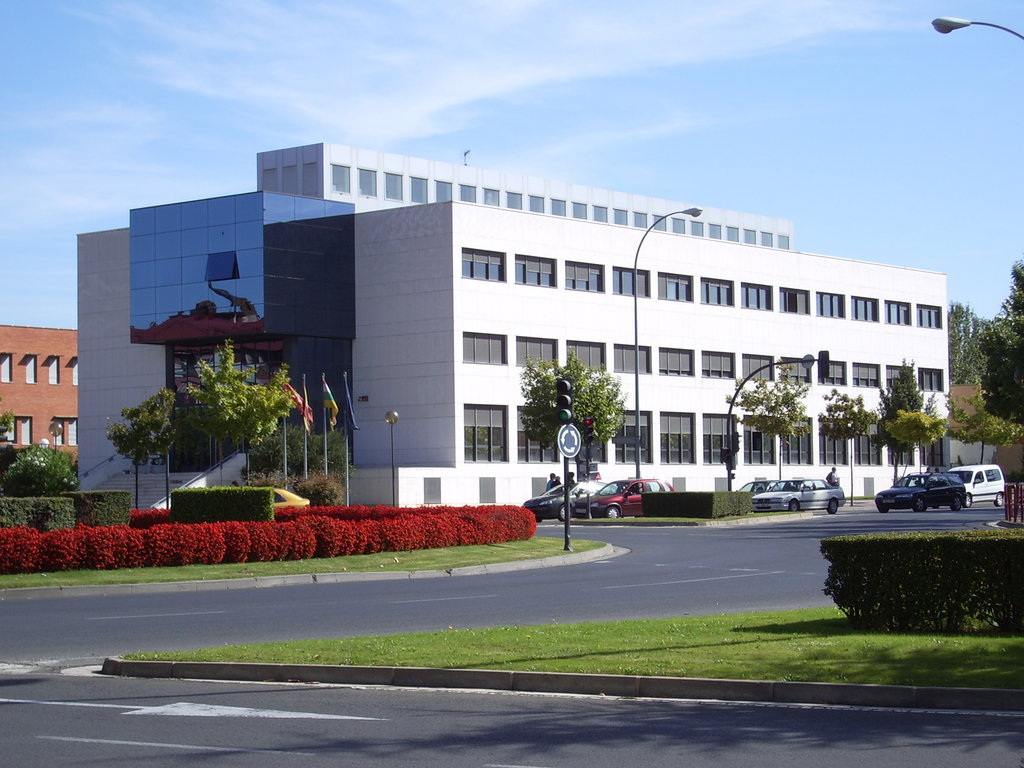
- Type: Public
- Established: 1992; 34 years ago
- Students: 7,600
- Location: Avda. de la Paz, 93 26006, Logroño., Logroño, Spain
- Website: http://www.unirioja.es

The University of La Rioja (UR) is a public institution of higher education based in Logroño, La Rioja, Spain. Inaugurated during 1992–1993 from various existing schools and colleges, it currently teaches Grades 19 adapted to the European Higher Education, and a varied program of masters, summer courses and courses of Spanish language and culture for foreigners. It has earned the Campus International Excellence for the project "Iberus" presented together with the public universities of Zaragoza, Navarra, and Lleida.

The campus of the University of La Rioja is located in Logroño. Teaching, research and culture are activities conducted in the roughly 200,000 square meters it covers. The shield of the University of La Rioja is composed of the initials "U" and "R" removed from the calligraphy of emilianenses codices, written and kept in the Monastery of San Millán de la Cogolla, considered 'the cradle of the Spanish' and a Heritage Site.

In 1996, the University of La Rioja was the first campus to create and teach Spanish in the Bachelor of Oenology, according to the tradition of winemaking in the region, while in 1999 it began offering studies in History and Bachelor of Science Music, the first given at a Spanish public campus entirely through the Internet and is now offered by the Bachelor of Science in Labour and much of the master's program and graduate courses.

The staff at the University of La Rioja is composed of about 450 members of teaching and research staff and 250 other members of the Administration and Services. The ratio remains at 15 students per teacher. In eighteen years of history, University of La Rioja has taught more than 14,000 students.

The UR is part of Group 9 of Universities, which brings together the nine public campuses that are unique in their autonomous region, and Tordesillas Group, a network of Latin American campus has its origins in the First Meeting of Rectors of Universities in Brazil, Spain and Portugal, which was held in June 2000 for the commemoration of 500 years of Brazil, in the Houses of the Treaty in Tordesillas (Valladolid).

In 1999 it received the Medal of the Government of La Rioja, in a ceremony in San Millan de la Cogolla. It runs Dialnet, a bibliographic database.

== See also ==
- Open access in Spain
