= Jesús María Sanz-Serna =

Jesús María Sanz-Serna (born 12 June 1953 in Valladolid, Spain) is a mathematician who specializes in applied mathematics. Sanz-Serna pioneered the field of geometric integration and wrote the first book on this subject. From 1998 to 2006, he was rector of the University of Valladolid.

He received the inaugural Dahlquist Prize from the Society for Industrial and Applied Mathematics in 1995 and became one of the inaugural fellows of the American Mathematical Society in 2012. His 60th birthday was celebrated at the 2013 International Conference on Scientific Computation and Differential Equations (SciCADE) in Valladolid.

== Biography ==
Sanz-Serna was born in Valladolid, Spain.He studied mathematics at the University of Valladolid from 1970 to 1975, earning a doctorate in functional analysis in 1977 under the supervision of Antonio Pérez Gómez. He later completed an MSc in numerical analysis at the University of Dundee in 1979.

After completing his doctorate, Sanz-Serna held teaching positions at the University of Valladolid. He joined the University of the Basque Country in 1981 and returned to Valladolid in 1982 as professor of applied mathematics, remaining there until 2014, apart from his tenure as rector. He subsequently joined Universidad Carlos III de Madrid as a Chair of Excellence and later became professor emeritus. In 2019, he was a Rothschild Distinguished Visiting Fellow at the Isaac Newton Institute, University of Cambridge.
