= Joan Massagué =

Spanish biologist

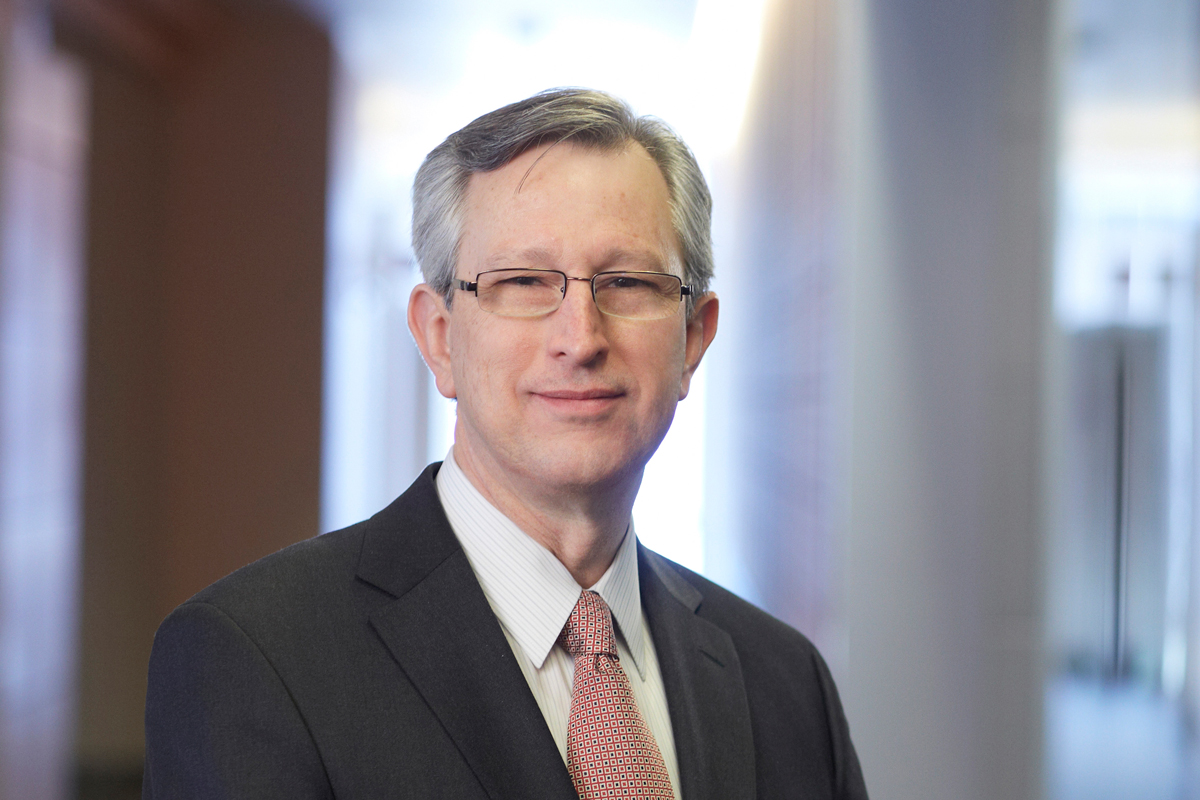
- Born: Joan Massagué i Solé; April 30, 1953 (age 73); Barcelona, Catalonia, Spain
- Education: University of Barcelona; Brown University
- Known for: Cancer metastasis
- Scientific career
- Fields: Cancer; biology
- Workplaces: Memorial Sloan-Kettering Cancer Center, Institute for Research in Biomedicine
- Website: The Joan Massagué Lab

Joan Massagué (born April 30, 1953), is a Spanish biologist and the current director of the Sloan Kettering Institute at Memorial Sloan Kettering Cancer Center. He is also an internationally recognized leader in the study of both cancer metastasis and growth factors that regulate cell behavior, as well as a professor at the Weill Cornell Graduate School of Medical Sciences.

== Education and career ==
Born in Barcelona, Spain, on April 30, 1953, Massagué earned his doctorate degree in biochemistry at the University of Barcelona in 1978 under the mentorship of Professor Joan J. Guinovart. He completed a postdoctoral fellowship in 1982 in the laboratory of Michael P. Czech, PhD, at Brown University, where he determined the composition of the receptor for the hormone insulin. Later that year, he became an assistant professor in biochemistry at the University of Massachusetts Medical School in Worcester.

Massagué joined Memorial Sloan Kettering in 1989 as the Alfred P. Sloan Chair of the Sloan Kettering Institute's Cell Biology Program and was named founding Chair of the Cancer Biology and Genetics Program in 2003. Additionally, he has served as a Scientific Advisor at the Institute for Research in Biomedicine in Barcelona since 2005.

He was an investigator at the Howard Hughes Medical Institute from 1990 to 2013. In 2014, he joined HHMI's Scientific Review Board. In 2013, Massagué was named Director of the Sloan Kettering Institute.

Massagué is a member of the Board of Directors of The Vilcek Foundation.

== Scientific contributions ==
Massagué is credited with establishing the dual role of TGFβ, which can both inhibit and activate tumor cell growth, and identifying its importance in cancer. His work identified the TGF-β receptors and cell signaling pathway, and defined the central concept of how this pathway controls cell fate.

In 2003, Dr. Massagué and colleagues documented the effects of the gain or loss of the TGF-β pathway in a mouse model of breast cancer, showing that it can increase lung metastases but suppress the growth of primary tumors. That same year, he published another paper that found that two genes expressed in breast cancer were increased in the presence of TGF-β and enabled the tumor cells to metastasize to the bone.

In 2005, Dr. Massagué and his team published a study that identified which breast cancer cells expressing an identified set of genes associated with metastasis were destined to spread to the lung versus elsewhere. Later work characterized gene sets and pathways in human cancer cells that enable breast and lung tumor cells to invade and colonize the brain.

Since 2009, his lab has published research on tumor self-seeding by circulating cancer cells, a process by which disseminated metastatic cells that resist cancer therapy re-infiltrate tissues to expand as highly aggressive clones. His lab also found that disseminated cancer cells use the cell adhesion molecule L1CAM to coopt blood capillaries for the initiation of metastatic outgrowth. In 2016, Massagué and his group defined the basis for metastatic latency in breast and lung cancers, and the interplay of metastatic stem cells with the innate immune system.

On January 13, 2020, a study by Massagué-led Sloan Kettering Institute in New York published a report in Nature Cancer, which deciphered the origin of metastases, which were previously believed to have begun by genetic mutations. With this discovery, the result of nearly 20 years of research, the path to better cancer treatments is being opened.

== Awards and honors ==
- Pezcoller Foundation-AACR International Award for Cancer Research (2016)
- Fellow, American Association for Cancer Research (AACR) Academy (2016)
- Charles Rodolphe Brupbacher Prize for Cancer Research (2015)
- Robert J. and Claire Pasarow Foundation Medical Research Award (2011)
- BBVA Frontiers of Knowledge Award in Science and technology (2008)
- Passano Laureate Award (2007)
- Vilcek Prize in Biomedical Science(2006)
- Member, National Academy of Medicine (2006)
- Prince of Asturias Award in Science and Technology (2004)
- Member, National Academy of Sciences (2000)
- Member, American Academy of Arts and Sciences (1999)
