= Izaskun Lacunza =

Spanish scientist, director of the FECYT

Izaskun Lacunza Aguirrebengoa (Navarra, 20th century) is a Spanish scientist, director of the Fundación Española para la Ciencia y la Tecnología (FECYT) since April 2024.

== Career ==
She graduated in Food Science and Technology and later obtained a doctorate in Chemical Sciences at the Autonomous University of Madrid and completed an Executive Program in Governance in the Public Sector at Escola Superior d'Administració i Direcció d'Empreses business school in Barcelona.

She started working at FECYT, a Spanish Foundation for Science and Technology run by Spanish ministry of Science in 2009, where over the years she has specialized in scientific projects management, on mobility and recruitment of scientific talent, as well as in open science and promotion of gender equality in research. Among others, she has managed and/or directed projects such as the EURAXESS initiative to attract talent, as well as the REBECA and FELISE programs, to promote scientific careers with a gender perspective. She has also directed the department of Science for Public Policies at FECYT.

Between 2012 and 2014, she was executive director of Ligue des Bibliothèques Européennes de Recherche (LIBER), the Association of European Research Libraries, and for a few years she was also coordinator of the Science and Technology Office of the Spanish Congress of Deputies, known as Oficina C.

In April 2024, she was appointed the new director general of the FECYT Foundation, dependent on the Ministry of Science, Innovation and Universities.
