= Centre de Recerca Matemàtica =

Spanish mathematical research institute

Coordinates: 41°30′01″N 2°06′32″E

The Centre de Recerca Matemàtica (CRM) (Catalan pronunciation: [ˈsentɾə ðə rəˈsɛɾkə mətəˈmatikə]) is a consortium, with its own legal status, integrated by the Institut d'Estudis Catalans (IEC) and the Catalan Government. It is a research institute associated with the Universitat Autònoma de Barcelona. The CRM is in essence a horizontal infrastructure that gives support to mathematical research groups and encourages the pursuit of emerging lines of research. The centre's activities are divided into two very different categories. The first category places the centre as organiser of international competitions (intensive research programmes, advances courses, conferences, etc.) and as a centre for long-term visiting researchers working in collaboration with the research community of Catalonia. Secondly, since 2008 CRM includes its own research groups, which allows it to open lines of research in different applied areas.

The current director of the CRM is Prof. Dr. Carme Cascante. The CRM is a member of ERCOM (European Research Centres in Mathematics). Through its postdoctoral programme, the institute is also part of EPDI (European Postdoctoral Institute).

The CRM has the following goals:

- To carry out research programmes on high-level topics.
- To attract the best post-doctoral fellows by way of competitive programmes of various administrations and agencies.
- To consolidate mechanisms for an efficient service to mathematicians.
- To take further steps towards becoming as competitive as the best European research centres and those of other scientifically developed countries of similar characteristics.
