= Jesús Jiménez Barbero =

Spanish scientist (born 1960)

Jesús Jiménez Barbero (born 1960, in Madrid) is a Spanish scientist who has contributed to the advance of glycoscience by unraveling the conformational properties of carbohydrates and analogues and the molecular basis of their interactions with proteins, using a multidisciplinary approach that employs carbohydrate synthesis, molecular biology, molecular modelling and Nuclear Magnetic Resonance (NMR) spectroscopy.

== Academic career ==
He studied chemistry at the Universidad Autonoma de Madrid where he obtained his PhD in 1987. He continued post-doctoral research at National Institute for Medical Research at Mill Hill. From 1990 to 1992, he was visiting scientist at Carnegie Mellon University (Pittsburgh, USA). He returned to Spain, rising to senior research scientist of CSIC at the Institute of Organic Chemistry (1996) and research professor of CSIC at the Centre for Biological Research (CIB-CSIC) (2002) where he was the head of the chemical and physical biology Department. He moved to CIC bioGUNE at Bilbao in 2014, as Ikerbasque professor and scientific director. He holds an ERC Advanced Grant (RecglycanNMR, 2018-2024).
