= Barcelona Science Park =

Parc Científic de Barcelona
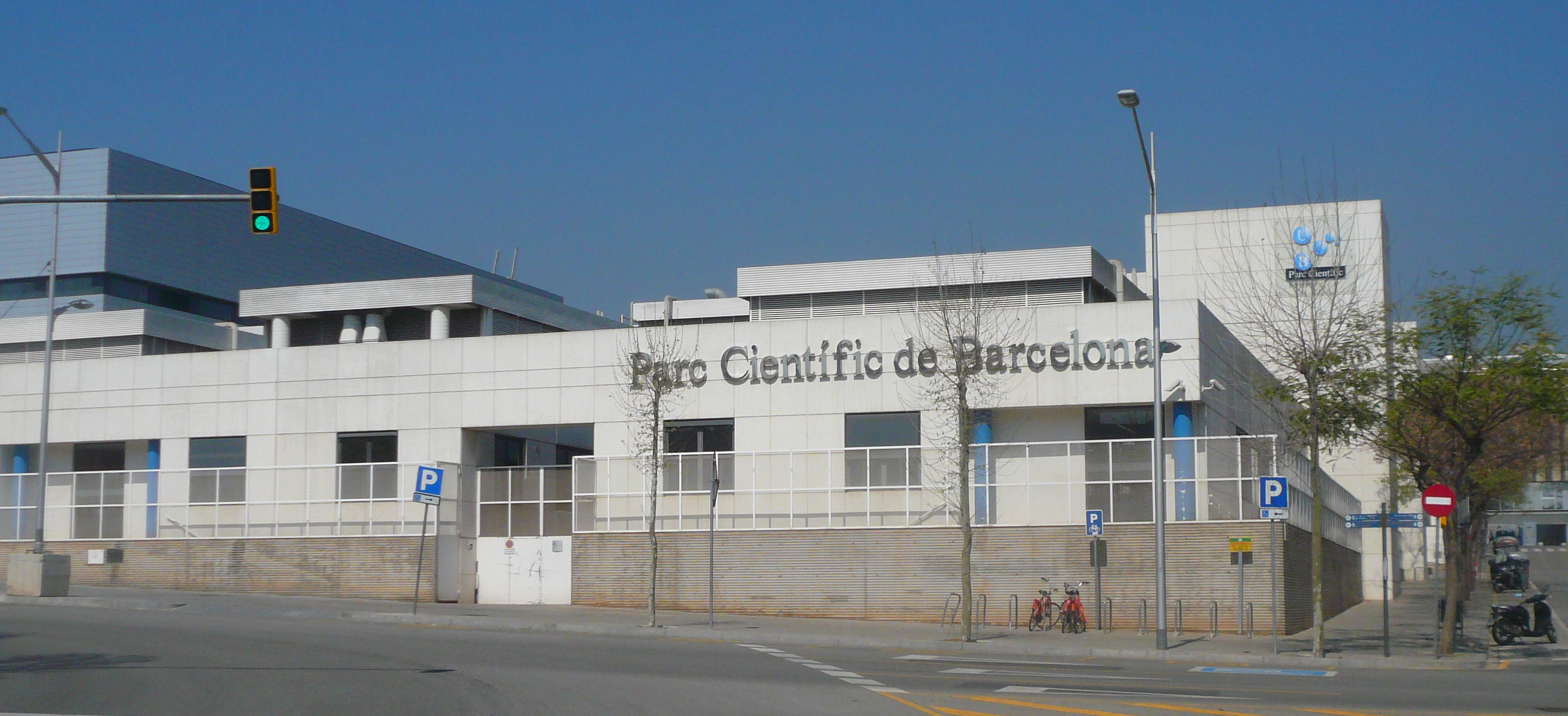
- Interactive map of Parc Científic de Barcelona
- Coordinates: 41°22′53.4″N 2°7′5.06″E
- Country: Spain
- Website: Official website

The Barcelona Science Park ("Parc Científic de Barcelona", abbreviated as PCB) is a scientific park located in the city of Barcelona, Spain.

== History ==
The facility began operations in 1997. In 2019, PCB incorporated a private investor and planned to open 10 new laboratories. Some of the facilities are not expected to open until 2025.

Tenants of the PBC include the Institute of Molecular Biology of Barcelona, the Institute for Research in Biomedicine, the National Center for Genomic Analysis (CNAG-CRG), Qiagen, Evonik Industries and Pharmacelera.
