= Fundación Española para la Ciencia y la Tecnología =

Spanish public foundation

Spanish Foundation for Science and Technology
- Fundación Española para la Ciencia y la Tecnología
- Abbreviation: FECYT
- Formation: 2001
- Type: Nonprofit
- director: Izaskun Lacunza (2024-)

The Fundación Española para la Ciencia y la Tecnología (FECYT) (English: Spanish Foundation for Science and Technology) is a Spanish public nonprofit organization dependent on the Ministry of Science that promotes Spanish science and technology. It was formed in 2001 and among other activities, it manages the National Museum of Science and Technology.
