= Arabic keyboard =

Keyboard layout for the Arabic alphabet

The Arabic keyboard (Arabic: لوحة المفاتيح العربية, romanized: lawḥat al-mafātīḥ al-ʕarabiyya) is the Arabic keyboard layout used for the Arabic alphabet. All computer Arabic keyboards contain both Arabic letters and Latin letters, the latter being necessary for URLs and e-mail addresses. Since Arabic is written from right to left, when one types with an Arabic keyboard, the letters will start appearing from the right side of the screen.

== Layouts ==
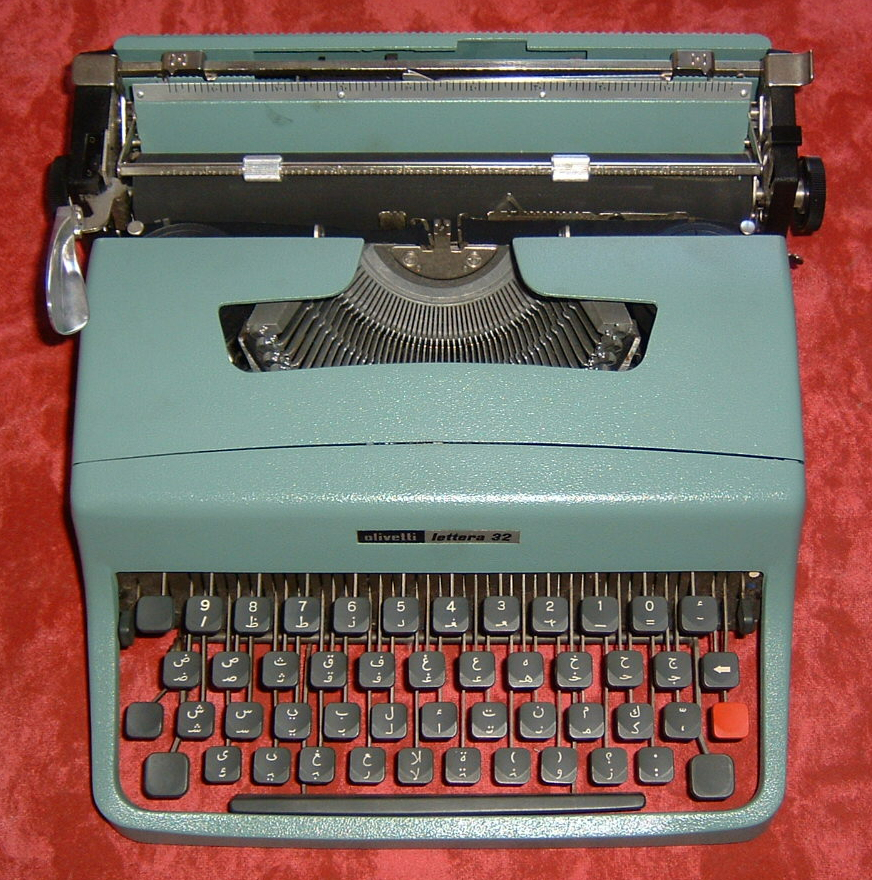
An Olivetti Lettera 32 typewriter with Arabic keyboard

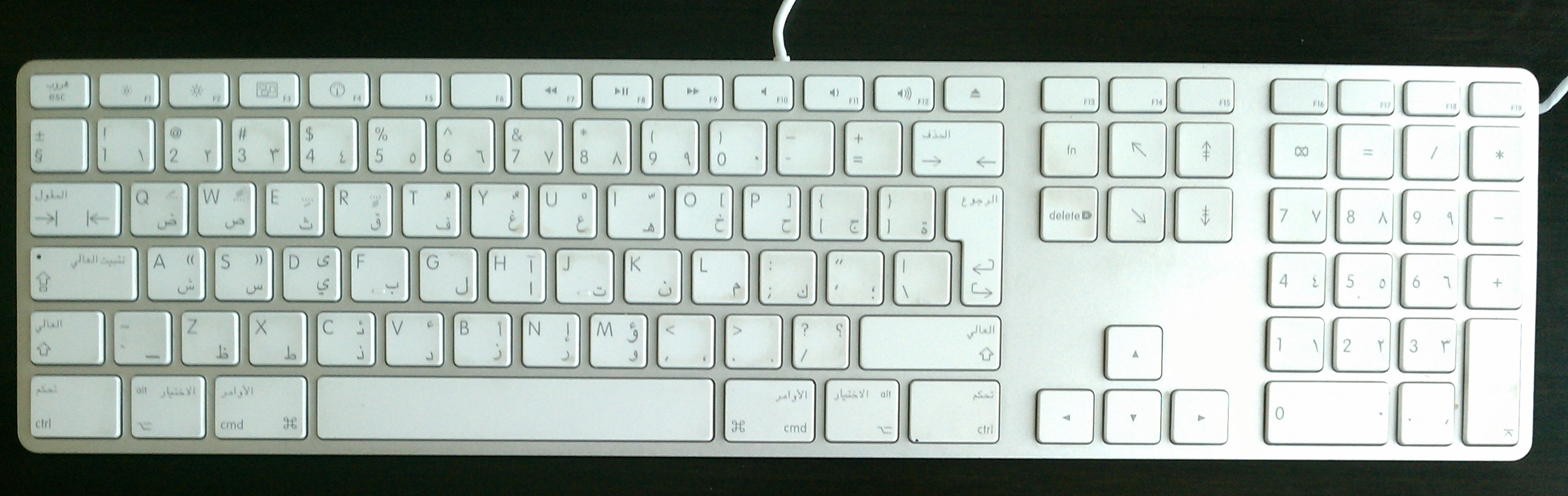
An Apple computer Arabic keyboard

=== Arabic typewriter ===
The Arabic layout typewriter was first patented by Selim Shibli Haddad, a Syrian artist and inventor. A British patent was filed three months later, on 1 December 1899, by Philippe Waked, the first person to type a document in Arabic. Both patents expired in 1919, prompting mass production in both Egypt and abroad.

=== Mac Arabic Keyboard ===
يبيسشب

=== Ubuntu Arabic Keyboard ===
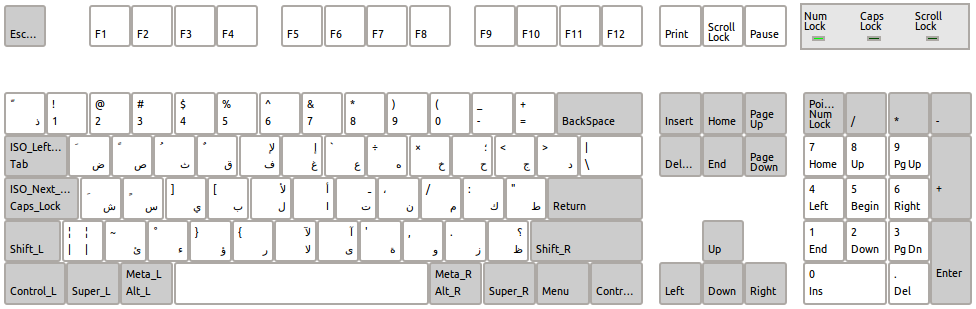

== See also ==
- Intellark
