= Oros =

Oros or Oroș may refer to:

- OROS, drug delivery system
- Oros, Sindhudurg, town in India
- Orós, municipality in Ceará, Brazil
- Oros, a South African juice brand

== People ==
- Oros of Alexandria, 5th century Byzantine lexicographer and grammarian
- Corneliu Oros (born 1950), Romanian former volleyball player
- Cristian Oroș (born 1984), Romanian football player
- Ernest L. Oros (died 2012), American politician from New Jersey
- George Oros (born 1954), American lawyer and politician from New York
- Joe Oros (1916–2012), American automotive designer
- Petro Oros (1917–1953) Ukrainian clandestine Greek-Catholic bishop
- Rozalia Oros (born 1964), Romanian fencer
- Yaroslav Oros (born 1959) Ukrainian writer and journalist

== See also ==
- Oro (disambiguation)
