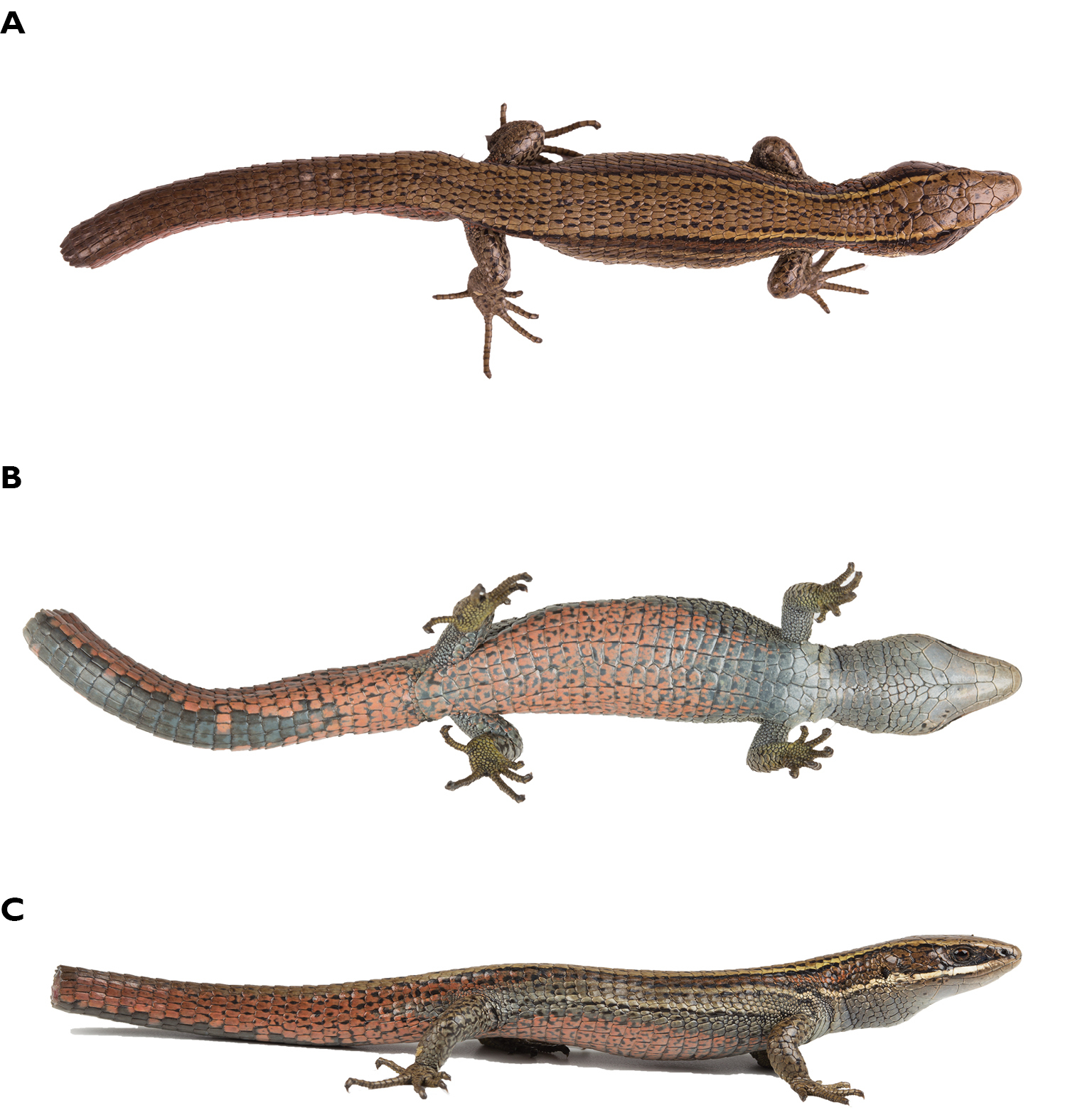

Scientific classification
- Kingdom: Animalia
- Phylum: Chordata
- Class: Reptilia
- Order: Squamata
- Family: Gymnophthalmidae
- Genus: Pholidobolus
- Species: P. fascinatus

Binomial name
- Pholidobolus fascinatus Parra, Sales–Nunes, & Torres-Carvajal, 2020

= Pholidobolus fascinatus =

Species of lizard

Pholidobolus fascinatus, also known as the haunted cuilane, is a species of lizard in the family Gymnophthalmidae. Males are slightly smaller than females, with an average snout–vent length of 47.6 mm compared to 48.2 mm. It inhabits wet paramo in the western slopes of the Andes of southern Ecuador and is only known from El Oro province. The authors of the study describing the species recommended that the species be considered data deficient due to its small known distribution and lack of additional data.

== Taxonomy ==
Pholidobolus fascinatus was formally described in 2020 based on an adult male specimen collected from near Lake Chillacocha in the El Oro Province, Ecuador. The species epithet fascinatus is a Latin word meaning enchanted, alluding to Lake Chillacocha, which is believed to have healing powers in local belief. The species has the English common name haunted cuilane and the Spanish common name Cuilanes encantados.

== Description ==
Males are slightly smaller than females, with an average snout–vent length of 47.6 mm compared to 48.2 mm. The adult male holotype has a brown dorsal background from the head to the base of the tail, with a diffuse chocolate-brown middorsal stripe that fades away towards the tail. There are light brown dorsolateral stripes on the head extending posteriorly and fading away at the midbody;. There is a white longitudinal stripe extending from the third supralabial to the shoulder. The sides of the neck, flanks, and limbs are brown. There is a narrow reddish-brown stripe extending from the tympanum to the arm insertion. The ventrolateral region of the body is grayish-brown. The throat and chest are gray and the belly has a gray background with conspicuous orange markings. The tail is orange anteriorly and laterally.

One adult male differed from the holotype in having the sides of the tail and chest dark brown without gray spots. An adult female differed from the holotype in having a light gray chest, dark gray ventral surface of the tail, dark brown sides of the tail, and in lacking any orange or red brown color on the sides of the neck.

== Distribution and ecology ==
Pholidobolus fascinatus inhabits wet paramo in the western slopes of the Andes of southern Ecuador. The new species is known only from El Oro province, at elevations of 3348−3382 m. All specimens were found active in the afternoon, mostly under stones.

41 eggs (17 of which were fragmented eggshells) were discovered in a communal nest next to one male. In captivity, eggs have been incubated in sphagnum and perlite. Eggs are 11.9–13.2 mm long, 5.5–9.2 mm wide, and weigh 0.5 g on average. Hatchlings weigh 0.4 g and are 26.2 mm in snout–vent length on average.

== Conservation ==
Pholidobolus fascinatus has not been assessed by the IUCN, but the authors of the study describing the species recommended that the species be considered data deficient due to its small known distribution and lack of additional data. Its population size for this species is unknown, but seems to have an average abundance.
