= Samek =

Samek (feminine: Samková) is a Czech surname. It probably originated as a shortened form of the given name Samuel. Notable people with the surname include:

- Anya Samek, American economist
- Daniel Samek (born 2004), Czech footballer
- Eva Adamczyková, née Samková (born 1993), Czech snowboarder
- Josef Samek (born 1957), Czech ski jumper
- Olga Samková (born 2005), Czech slalom canoeist
- Tom Samek (1950–2021), Czech artist

== See also ==
- Pholidobolus samek, a species of lizard
