= Pholidobolus hillisi =

Scientific classification
- Kingdom: Animalia
- Phylum: Chordata
- Class: Reptilia
- Order: Squamata
- Family: Gymnophthalmidae
- Genus: Pholidobolus
- Species: P. hillisi

Binomial name
- Pholidobolus hillisi Torres-Carvajal, Venegas, Lobos, Mafla-Endara, & Sales-Nunes, 2014

Species of lizard

Pholidobolus hillisi is a species of lizard in the family Gymnophthalmidae. It is endemic to Ecuador. Its common name is "Cuilanes of Hillis."
