= Pholidobolus odinsae =

Scientific classification
- Kingdom: Animalia
- Phylum: Chordata
- Order: Squamata
- Family: Gymnophthalmidae
- Genus: Pholidobolus
- Species: P. odinsae

Binomial name
- Pholidobolus odinsae Amézquita, Mazariegos, Cañaveral, Orejuela, Barragán-Contreras, & Daza, 2023

Species of lizard

Pholidobolus odinsae is a species of lizard in the family Gymnophthalmidae. It was formally described in 2023 and is named after the company Odinsa, which has supported projects regenerating Andean forest. It is currently known from over five locations in the Colombian departments of Antioquia and Chocó, but could be more widespread than currently known. Males have a brown or pale brown, a white vertebral stripe, brown sides and limbs, grey to black throats, and grey to black bellies. Females have pink to orange bellies and cream to pink throats. Its conservation status is as as-yet unassessed.

== Taxonomy ==
Pholidobolus odinsae was formally described in 2023 based on an adult male specimen collected from the Mesenia-Paramillo Nature Reserve in the municipality of Jardín in the Antioquia Department, Colombia. It was named after Odinsa, a company involved in the Cartama Conservation Project to regenerate Andean forest along the Quebrada San Antonio basin.

== Description ==
The dorsum is brown or pale brown, bisected by a white vertebral stripe, extending from the head to the mid-tail. The vertebral stripe is bordered by darker, usually dark brown or black, stripes. On the head, the pale stripe extends from the first supralabial to the shoulder, dorsally reaching the rostral scale, and laterally including the frontonasal, prefrontal, frontal, frontoparietal, interparietal, and postparietal scales. The sides of the neck, flanks, and limbs are predominantly brown, usually with less than five small, white ocelli, bordered by a black stripe and concentrated on the shoulders. There is a white or cream lateral line from the supralabials, passing through the shoulder and extending continuously up to the insertion of the limbs, but not towards the tail. There are very few scattered red scales, more common around the shoulder ocelli. The throat is cream to pink in females and grey to black in males. The chest, belly and base of the tail are pink to orange in adult females and grey to black in males, with bare or no patterning in both sexes.

== Distribution and ecology ==
Pholidobolus odinsae is currently known from over five locations in the Colombian departments of Antioquia and Chocó, which together encompass an area of less than 500 km^{2}; however, it does not seem to have a patchy distribution and could be more widespread than currently known. The species is currently known from forest edges, and open areas including pastures, crops, and around human buildings. Most specimens were seen and found amongst grass or leaf litter even hundreds of metres away from the nearest forests.

Pholidobolus odinsae seems clearly heliothermic: within minutes after the sun appeared, they came out of their refuges, remain exposed, and extended their ribs increasing the dorsal surface available for sun basking. Under sunny conditions, the species seems to be abundant at the known localities. Many individuals showed signs of a regenerated tail.

== Conservation ==
Pholidobolus odinsae has not been assessed by the IUCN, but the authors of the study describing the species recommended that the species be considered data-deficient due to an absence of proper information to evaluate the species' conservation status. It is known from the Mesenia-Paramillo Nature Reserve, a protected areas.
