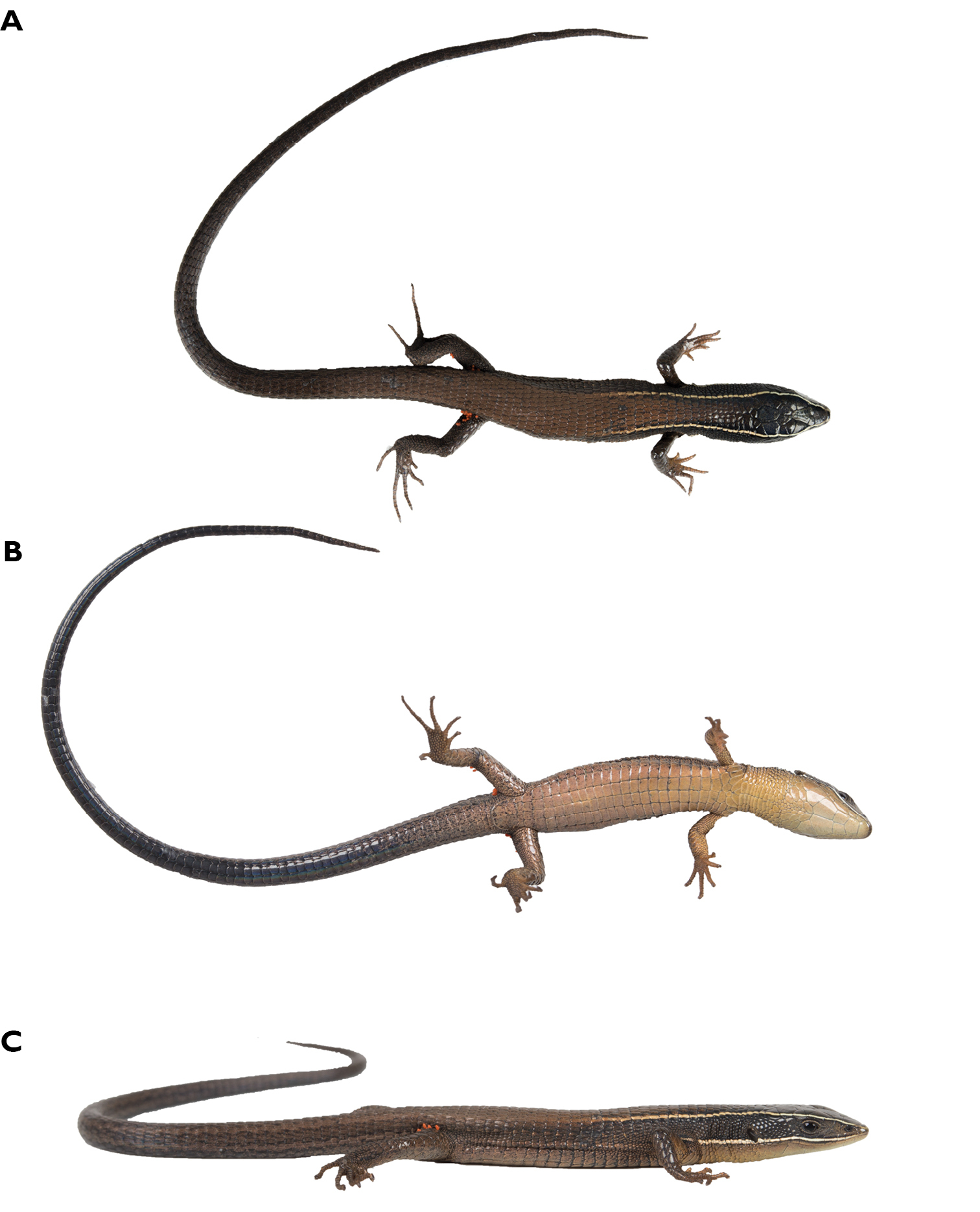

Scientific classification
- Kingdom: Animalia
- Phylum: Chordata
- Class: Reptilia
- Order: Squamata
- Family: Gymnophthalmidae
- Genus: Pholidobolus
- Species: P. dolichoderes

Binomial name
- Pholidobolus dolichoderes Parra, Sales–Nunes, & Torres-Carvajal, 2020

= Pholidobolus dolichoderes =

Species of lizard

Pholidobolus dolichoderes, also known as the long-necked cuilane, is a species of lizard in the family Gymnophthalmidae. Formally described in 2020, it is named for its distinctively long neck. It is known to occur at elevations of 2506−2675 m in San Felipe de Oña in southwestern Azuay province in Ecuador. The authors of the study describing the species recommended that the species be considered data deficient due to its small known distribution and lack of additional data.

== Taxonomy ==
Pholidobolus dolichoderes was formally described in 2020 based on an adult male specimen collected from San Felipe de Oña in the Azuay Province, Ecuador. The specific epithet dolichoderes derives from the Greek words dolikhós, meaning long, and derē, meaning neck, in allusion to the distinctively long neck of this species. The species has the English common name long-necked cuilane and the Spanish common name Cuilane de cuello largo.

== Description ==
The holotype adult male has a dark brown dorsal background of head, with a diffuse pale brown vertebral stripe that becomes grayish-brown towards the tail. There are creamy-white dorsolateral stripes on the head extending posteriorly and fading away at the midbody. There is a white longitudinal stripe extending from the first supralabial to the shoulder. The sides of the neck are brown and the flanks are grayish-brown with diffuse dark brown marks. The limbs are brown and the ventrolateral region of body is grayish-brown. The throat and chest are cream-colored while the belly is grayish-cream. The base of the tail is gray with dark little spots.

== Distribution and ecology ==
Pholidobolus dolichoderes is known to occur at elevations of 2506−2675 m in San Felipe de Oña in southwestern Azuay province in Ecuador. This area is composed of many different landscapes including small valleys, desert areas, and wet paramo. Most specimens were found active during the day, mostly on the ground or near spiny Puya ground bromeliads.

== Conservation ==
Pholidobolus dolichoderes has not been assessed by the IUCN, but the authors of the study describing the species recommended that the species be considered data deficient due to its small known distribution and lack of additional data. It is only known from unprotected localities around Oña.
