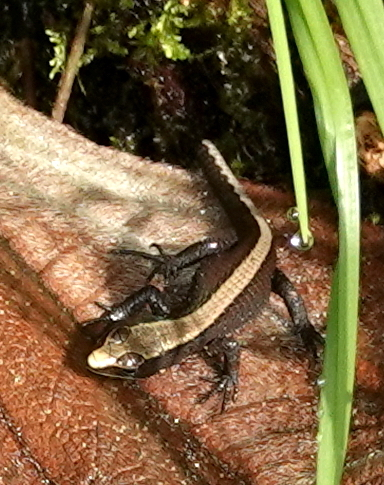
- Pholidobolus vertebralis

Scientific classification
- Domain: Eukaryota
- Kingdom: Animalia
- Phylum: Chordata
- Class: Reptilia
- Order: Squamata
- Family: Gymnophthalmidae
- Tribe: Cercosaurini
- Genus: Pholidobolus; Peters, 1863

= Pholidobolus =

Genus of lizards

Pholidobolus is a genus of lizards in the family Gymnophthalmidae. They occur in north-western South America (Peru, Ecuador, and Colombia).

== Species ==
There are 17 species:

- Pholidobolus affinis (Peters, 1863) – Peters's pholiodobolus
- Pholidobolus argosi Amézquita, Mazariegos, Cañaveral, Orejuela, Barragán-Contreras, & Daza, 2023
- Pholidobolus celsiae Amézquita, Mazariegos, Cañaveral, Orejuela, Barragán-Contreras, & Daza, 2023
- Pholidobolus condor Parra, Sales–Nunes, & Torres-Carvajal, 2020
- Pholidobolus dicrus (Uzzell, 1973) – Uzzell's prionodactylus
- Pholidobolus dolichoderes Parra, Sales–Nunes, & Torres-Carvajal, 2020
- Pholidobolus fascinatus Parra, Sales–Nunes, & Torres-Carvajal, 2020
- Pholidobolus hillisi Torres-Carvajal, Venegas, Lobos, Mafla-Endara, & Sales-Nunes, 2014
- Pholidobolus macbrydei Montanucci, 1973 – MacBryde's pholiodobolus
- Pholidobolus marianus (Ruthven, 1921)
- Pholidobolus montium (Peters, 1863) – mountain pholiodobolus
- Pholidobolus odinsae Amézquita, Mazariegos, Cañaveral, Orejuela, Barragán-Contreras, & Daza, 2023
- Pholidobolus paramuno Hurtado-Gómez, Arredondo, Sales-Nunes, & Daza, 2018
- Pholidobolus prefrontalis Montanucci, 1973 – Montanucci's pholiodobolus
- Pholidobolus samek Parra, Sales–Nunes, & Torres-Carvajal, 2020
- Pholidobolus ulisesi Venegas, Echevarría, Lobos, Sales-Nunes, & Torres-Carvajal, 2016
- Pholidobolus vertebralis (O'Shaugnessy, 1879) – brown prionodactylus
