= Pholidobolus celsiae =

Scientific classification
- Kingdom: Animalia
- Phylum: Chordata
- Order: Squamata
- Family: Gymnophthalmidae
- Genus: Pholidobolus
- Species: P. celsiae

Binomial name
- Pholidobolus celsiae Amézquita, Mazariegos, Cañaveral, Orejuela, Barragán-Contreras, & Daza, 2023

Species of lizard

Pholidobolus celsiae is a species of lizard in the family Gymnophthalmidae. It was formally described in 2023 and is named after the Celsia Foundation, which restores cloud and dry forests in the tropical Andes. It is endemic to Colombia, being known from three localities in the municipalities of Mistrató and Pereira within the department of Risaralda. It is found in open areas with secondary vegetation, at the edge of a cloud forest. These frogs have brown dorsums, cream-colored or white vertebral stripes, and brown sides. The throat is cream to pale brown in males and pink in females. The chest, belly, and base of the tail are cream-colored to pink in females, but orange in males. It has not yet been assessed by the IUCN, but the scientists describing it recommended it be considered endangered.

== Taxonomy ==
Pholidobolus celsiae was formally described in 2023 based on an adult male specimen collected from the municipality of Mistratóin the Risaralda Department, Colombia. It was named after the Celsia Foundation, which works to restore cloud and dry forests in the tropical Andes, as well as educate children.

== Description ==
The dorsum is dark brown, bisected by a cream-colored or white vertebral stripe, extending from the head to the base of the tail. The vertebral stripe is bordered by darker, usually black, stripes. On the head, the pale stripe extends from the first supralabial to the shoulder dorsally reaching the rostral scale, and laterally not in contact with the supraocular and parietal scales. The sides of the neck, flanks, and limbs are predominantly brown. The neck, flanks, and tail base usually have more than 10 white ocelli, bordered by a black stripe. There is a white or cream-colored lateral line from the supralabials to the shoulder. There is also a cream-colored, interrupted lateral stripe, running between the insertions of the fore and hind limbs, not extending towards the tail. There are many red scales grouped above the shoulder and along the lateral surface of the tail, which are more common in males. The throat is cream to pale brown in males, paler towards the anterior extreme, and pink in females. The chest, belly, and base of the tail are cream-colored to pink in females, but orange in males; they are often marked with black blotches that are more common in adult males.

== Distribution and ecology ==
The species is currently known from three localities in the municipalities of Mistrató and Pereira, within the department of Risaralda. The specimens were mostly collected in open areas with secondary vegetation, at the edge of a cloud forest.

Pholidobolus celsiae seems to nest communally, with groups of up to nine eggs were found together with adult individuals under a rock. Also, the observed specimens appeared clearly heliothermic: within minutes after the sun appeared, they came out of their refuges, remained exposed, and extended their ribs increasing the dorsal surface available for sun basking. Many individuals showed signs of a regenerated tail.

== Conservation ==
Pholidobolus celsiae has not been assessed by the IUCN, but the authors of the study describing the species recommended that the species be considered endangered. It is known from two protected areas, the Mesenia-Paramillo Nature Reserve and the Santuario de Flora y Fauna Otún-Quimbaya.
