= Oro =

Oro or ORO, meaning gold in Spanish and Italian, may refer to:

== Music and dance ==
- Oro (dance), a Balkan circle dance
- Oro (eagle dance), an eagle dance from Montenegro and Herzegovina
- "Oro" (Mango song), 1984
- "Oro" (Jelena Tomašević song), the Serbian entry in the 2008 Eurovision Song Contest
- ORO, Máire Brennan
- Oro: Grandes Éxitos, an album by ABBA
- Oro album, an RIAA certification for Spanish-language albums

== Places ==
- Oro, Estonia, a village
- Orø, an island in Denmark
- Örö, a Finnish island northeast of Oskarshamn, Sweden
- 4733 ORO, a main-belt asteroid
- Oro City, Colorado, US, a ghost town
- Oro County, Kansas Territory, a US county from 1859 to 1861
- Oro Moraine, Ontario, Canada, a glacial moraine
- Oro Province, Papua New Guinea
  - Oro Bay
- Oro-Medonte or Oro, Ontario, Canada, a township
- Yonggwang County or Oro, North Korea
  - Oro concentration camp, a North Korean concentration camp for political prisoners
- Oro, a place in Irepodun, Kwara, Nigeria

== Sports ==
- CD Oro, a football club in Jalisco, Mexico
- Oro F.C., a semi-professional association football team from Papua New Guinea

== Other uses ==
- Oro (name)
- Oro (beverage), a Peruvian soft drink
- Oro (grape) or garganega, an Italian wine grape
- Oro (Street Fighter), a video game character in Street Fighter III
- Oro Inc., an American software company
- 'Oro, a god in Polynesian mythology
- Oro, a type of tequila
- Oak Ridge Observatory or ORO, an observatory in Harvard, Massachusetts, United States
- Open Research Online, an open-access repository of research publications
- Oro language, a Lower Cross River language of Nigeria
- Oro languages, a language family of Papua New Guinea
- Orokolo language, by ISO 639-3 code

== See also ==
- El Oro (disambiguation)
