= Pholidobolus marianus =

Scientific classification
- Kingdom: Animalia
- Phylum: Chordata
- Class: Reptilia
- Order: Squamata
- Family: Gymnophthalmidae
- Genus: Pholidobolus
- Species: P. marianus

Binomial name
- Pholidobolus marianus (Ruthven, 1921)

Species of lizard

Pholidobolus marianus is a species of lizard in the family Gymnophthalmidae. It is endemic to Colombia.
