= Arabic letter frequency =

Distribution of letters in a typical Arabic text

The frequency of letters in text has often been studied for use in cryptanalysis, and frequency analysis in particular.

No language has an exact letter frequency distribution, as all writers write slightly differently. As a rule texts in different languages using the Arabic script (e.g. Arabic, Kurdish, Malay, Persian and Urdu) will have different letter frequencies, most obviously in the case of letters which are only used in some languages (e.g. the letters ڤ, پ, چ, گ, or ڨ which are not part of Standard Arabic).

Methods encoding the most frequent letters with the shortest symbols were pioneered by telegraph codes, and are used in modern data-compression techniques such as Huffman coding.

== Arabic letters ==
The Arabic alphabet consists of 28 primary letters, these are letters 1 to 28 in Table 1. The eight modified letters listed in positions 29 to 36 in the same table are used just the same. If these 8 modified forms are folded into the primary list based on shape or phonetic similarity, the outcome then is as shown in Table 2. For accurate frequency analysis, each of the 36 letters of Table 1 gets its frequency counted independently.

The ordering of the alphabet shown in the tables is more logical than is used by the Unicode standard.

Figure 1: Arabic characters that can be produced using the Arabic Letter Keyboard Intellark.

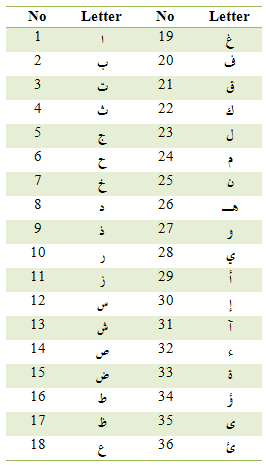
Table 1: The Arabic alphabet. Letters 1 to 28 are the primary letters. Letters 29 to 36 are the modified letters.

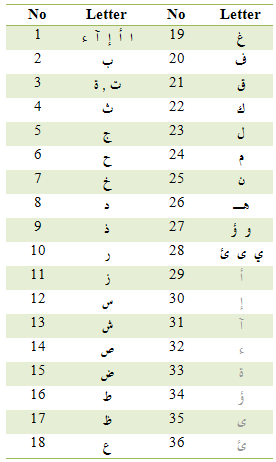
Table 2: The Arabic alphabet, with modified letters lumped onto their primary forms.

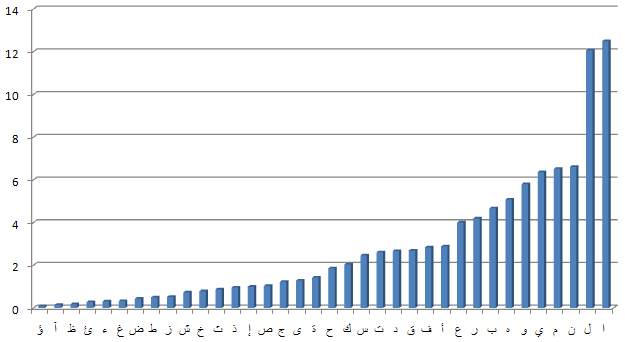
Letter frequency distribution for the counted letters: Histogram data sorted on frequency.

Although the full set of Arabic characters includes about ten diacritics as shown in the Figure 1, frequency analysis of Arabic characters is only concerned with computing the frequency of alphabet letters shown in Table 2.

== Arabic letter frequency using general sources ==
The following Arabic sources are used to generate an acceptable amount of data on which frequency statistics are conducted.

- The first seven volumes of the series البداية والنهاية (The Beginning and The End) of Ibn Kathir, with 2,855 pages, containing 1,096,047 words, containing 4,326,031 letters.
- The book of الرحيق المختوم (The Sealed Nectar) of Almubarakfuri, with 284 pages, containing 134,662 words, containing 553,740 letters.
- The book of تحفة العروسين (The Masterpiece of the Brides) of Al-shuri, with 239 pages, containing 66,550 words, containing 242,361 letters.

Collectively, these sources add up to 3,378 pages, with 1,297,259 words, and 5,122,132 letters.

The following graph shows the letter frequency distribution for the counted letters.

Letter	Relative frequency in the Arabic language
ء	0.31%
ؤ	0.09%
ئ	0.28%
ا	12.50%
آ	0.15%
أ	2.89%
إ	1.00%
ب	4.67%
ة	1.42%
ت	2.61%
ث	0.87%
ج	1.23%
ح	1.86%
خ	0.79%
د	2.67%
ذ	0.96%
ر	4.20%
ز	0.52%
س	2.47%
ش	0.73%
ص	1.04%
ض	0.44%
ط	0.50%
ظ	0.18%
ع	4.01%
غ	0.33%
ف	2.84%
ق	2.69%
ك	2.04%
ل	12.07%
م	6.52%
ن	6.61%
ه	5.08%
و	5.80%
ى	1.29%
ي	6.36%
