= Pholidobolus macbrydei =

Conservation status
- Least Concern (IUCN 3.1)

Scientific classification
- Kingdom: Animalia
- Phylum: Chordata
- Class: Reptilia
- Order: Squamata
- Family: Gymnophthalmidae
- Genus: Pholidobolus
- Species: P. macbrydei

Binomial name
- Pholidobolus macbrydei Montanucci, 1973

Species of lizard

Pholidobolus macbrydei, MacBryde's pholiodobolus, is a species of lizard in the family Gymnophthalmidae. It is endemic to Ecuador.
