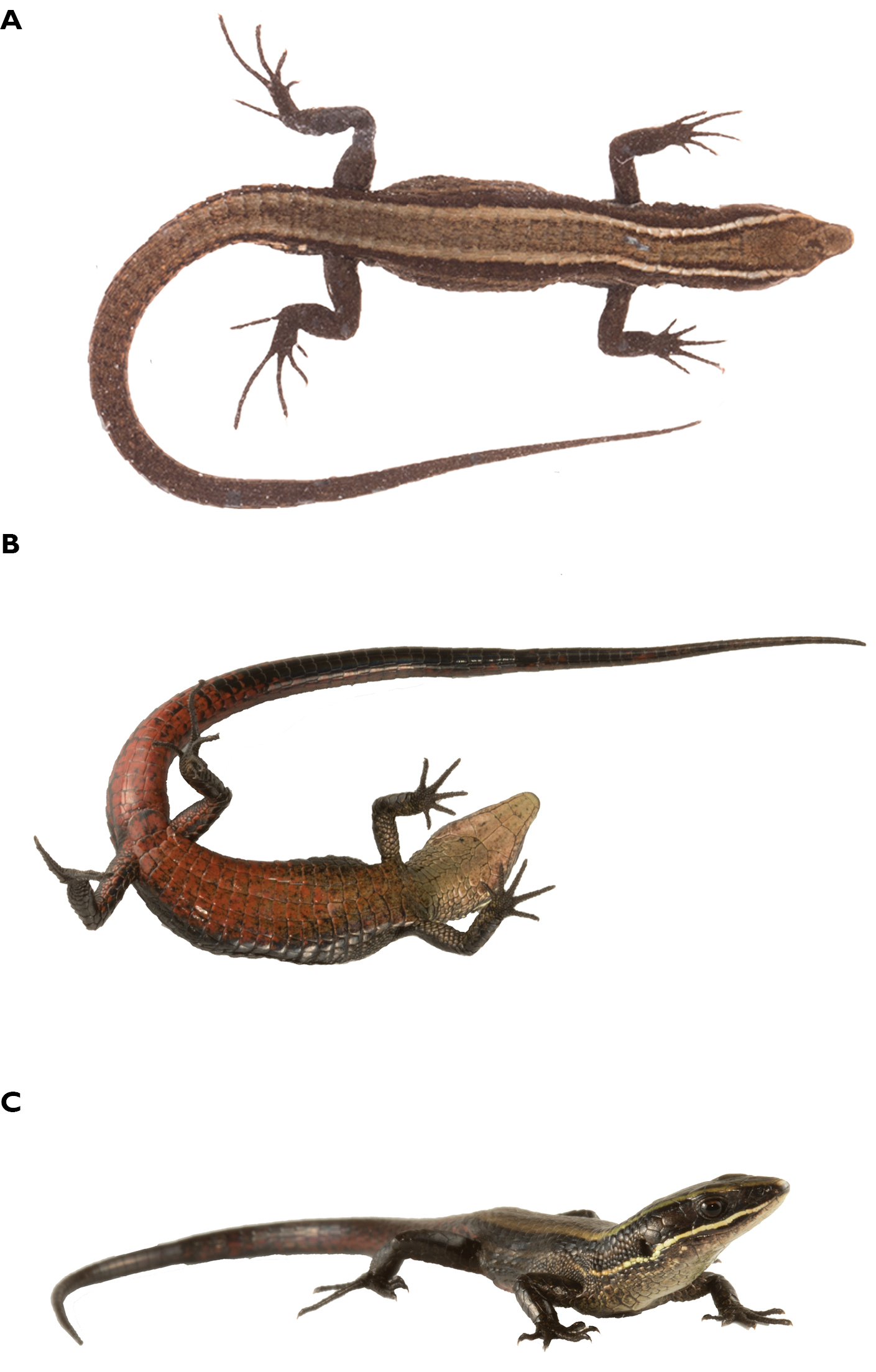

Scientific classification
- Kingdom: Animalia
- Phylum: Chordata
- Class: Reptilia
- Order: Squamata
- Family: Gymnophthalmidae
- Genus: Pholidobolus
- Species: P. condor

Binomial name
- Pholidobolus condor Parra, Sales–Nunes, & Torres-Carvajal, 2020

= Pholidobolus condor =

Species of lizard

Pholidobolus condor is a species of lizard in the family Gymnophthalmidae. It is endemic to Ecuador.

== Taxonomy ==
Pholidobolus condor was formally described in 2020 based on an adult male specimen collected from the buffer zone of the El Quimi Biological Reserve, in the Morona-Santiago Province, Ecuador. The specific epithet condor refers to Cordillera del Cóndor, where the new species was discovered. The species has the English common name Condor cuilane and the Spanish common name Cuilane del Cóndor.

== Description ==
The holotype adult male had a dark brown dorsal background from the head to the base of the tail, with a golden brown vertebral stripe extending from the occiput to the tail. There are greenish-cream dorsolateral stripes on the head, becoming light brown on the posterior part of the body. There is a white longitudinal stripe extending from the first supralabial to the shoulder. The sides of the neck, flanks, and limbs are dark brown. There is a chocolate-brown narrow stripe extending from the tympanum to the arm insertion. The ventrolateral region of the body is grayish-brown and the throat is reddish-cream. The chest, belly, base of the tail, and lateral region of the tail are bright orange, with brown marks on some scales. The ventral surface of the hind limbs has orange diffuse marks. Unlike the adult male, hatchlings lack reddish color on tail.

== Distribution and ecology ==
Pholidobolus condor occurs in the Cordillera del Cóndor in southeastern Ecuador at elevations between 1994–2226 m. It has been found in El Quimi Biological Reserve in Morona-Santiago province. The holotype was found active at night at the base of a bromeliad on a sandstone plateau of shrub vegetation.

Several eggs were found within a bromeliad, suggesting that females of P. condor lay their eggs in communal nests. In captivity, they have been incubated in sphagnum and perlite for around three months. Hatchlings weigh 0.4 g and are 23.7 mm in snout–vent length on average.

== Conservation ==
Pholidobolus condor has not been assessed by the IUCN, but the authors of the study describing the species recommended that the species be considered critically endangered due to its small known distribution and habitat disturbance near its range. The Cordillera del Cóndor is currently threatened by mining activities; habitat destruction and fragmentation is evident at a distance of around 11 km from the species' known localities.
