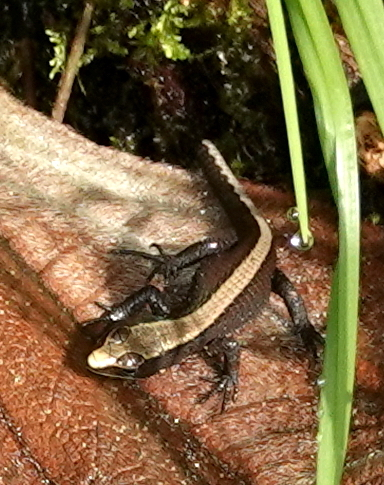

Conservation status
- Least Concern (IUCN 3.1)

Scientific classification
- Kingdom: Animalia
- Phylum: Chordata
- Class: Reptilia
- Order: Squamata
- Family: Gymnophthalmidae
- Genus: Pholidobolus
- Species: P. vertebralis

Binomial name
- Pholidobolus vertebralis O'Shaughnessy, 1879

= Pholidobolus vertebralis =

Species of lizard

Pholidobolus vertebralis, the brown pholiodobolus, is a species of lizard in the family Gymnophthalmidae. It is found in Panama, Ecuador, Colombia, and Peru.
