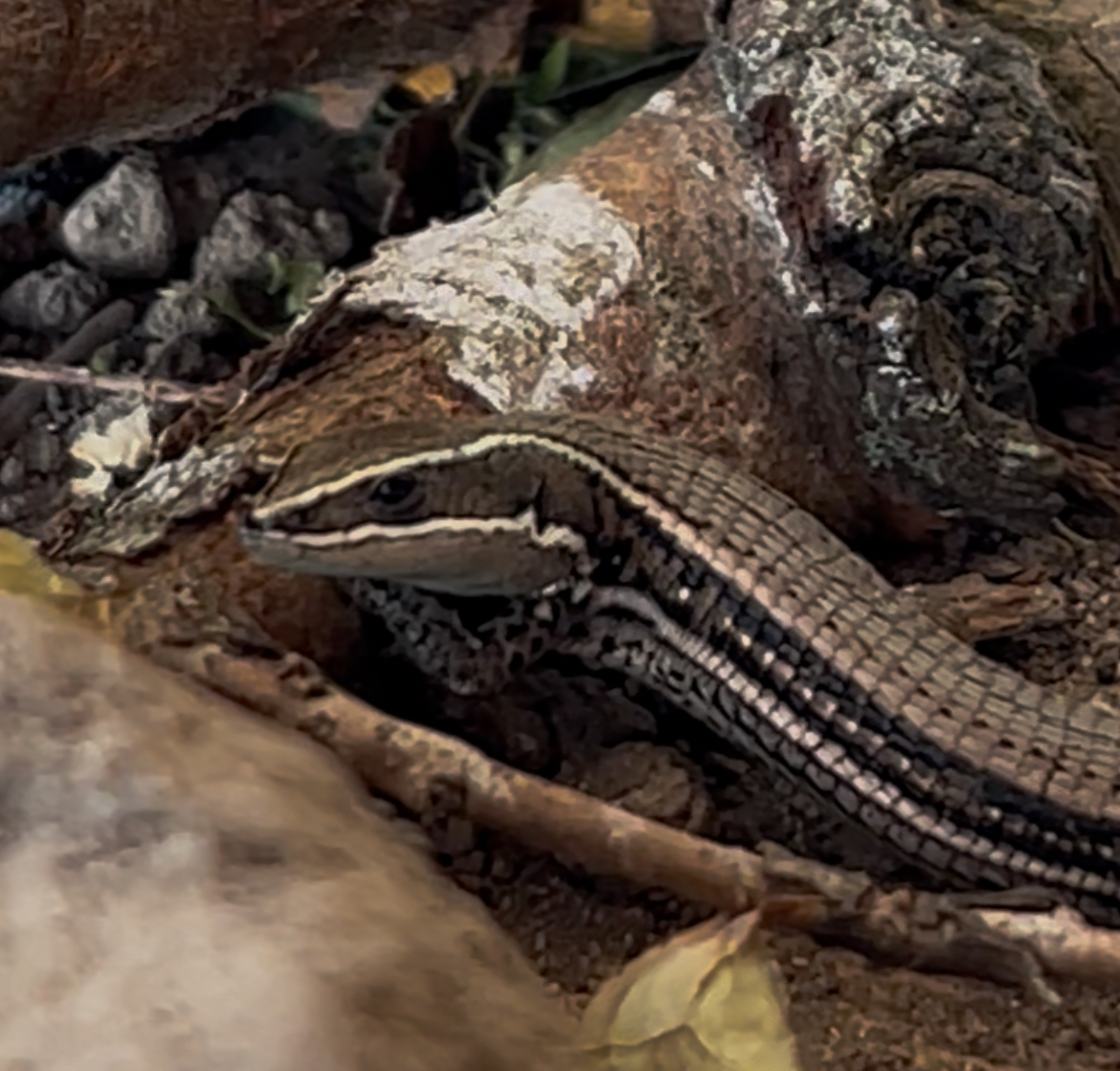

Conservation status
- Near Threatened (IUCN 3.1)

Scientific classification
- Kingdom: Animalia
- Phylum: Chordata
- Class: Reptilia
- Order: Squamata
- Family: Gymnophthalmidae
- Genus: Pholidobolus
- Species: P. montium

Binomial name
- Pholidobolus montium (Peters, 1863)

= Pholidobolus montium =

Species of lizard

Pholidobolus montium, commonly known as the mountain pholiodobolus, cuilán, or miner lizard, is a species of lizard in the family Gymnophthalmidae. It is endemic to the highlands of the northern Ecuadorian and southern Colombian Andes.

== Description ==
Pholidobolus montium is a small, diurnal terrestrial lizard. Adult males reach an average snout-vent length (SVL) of approximately 56 mm, while females are slightly larger, reaching up to 66 mm. They exhibit grey-black iridescent dorsal color patterns, a pale yellow dorsolateral stripe, and a distinctive white-cream lip stripe that extends backward toward the forelimbs.

Unlike many other lizard clades, P. montium completely lacks femoral follicular glands, a physiological trait it shares with only one other member of its genus, Pholidobolus prefrontalis.

== Habitat and ecology ==
The species inhabits open shrubby areas, alpine environments, and urbanized regions at high elevations. It is frequently found hiding in natural or man-made burrows, rock piles, stone walls, and agave fence rows, leading to its local name "miner lizard". It is a diurnal species that spends a significant portion of its day foraging and basking to thermoregulate.

=== Reproduction ===
Breeding occurs continuously throughout the year. Females deposit clutches of two eggs per reproductive cycle. Pholidobolus montium frequently utilizes communal nesting sites where multiple females deposit eggs together, suggesting a complex level of social aggregation.

== Behavior and communication ==
Historically, semi-fossorial (burrowing) gymnophthalmid lizards were believed to communicate almost exclusively through chemical and olfactory cues. However, a comprehensive 2021 behavioral study published an ethogram of 34 distinct behaviors for P. montium, establishing it as the first semi-fossorial gymnophthalmid documented to rely extensively on visual signaling.

Conforming with the absence of pheromone-secreting femoral glands, P. montium uses several distinct visual displays during conspecific (same-species) social interactions:

- Hand-waving (Leg-waving): One of the most frequent and immediate responses when encountering another lizard or its own reflection in a mirror. The lizard raises a single forelimb and moves it in a distinct waving motion to signal its presence or status.
- Neck-arching: A postural display where the lizard rigidifies and arches its neck downward or upward during social standoffs.
- Tail-undulation: Actively waving or undulating the tail in a fluid motion, which serves as a visual signal during conspecific stimulus events rather than an anti-predatory distraction.
