= Pholidobolus ulisesi =

Scientific classification
- Kingdom: Animalia
- Phylum: Chordata
- Class: Reptilia
- Order: Squamata
- Family: Gymnophthalmidae
- Genus: Pholidobolus
- Species: P. ulisesi

Binomial name
- Pholidobolus ulisesi Venegas, Echevarría, Lobos, Sales-Nunes, & Torres-Carvajal, 2016

Species of lizard

Pholidobolus ulisesi is a species of lizard in the family Gymnophthalmidae. It is endemic to Peru.
