= Pholidobolus affinis =

Conservation status
- Near Threatened (IUCN 3.1)

Scientific classification
- Kingdom: Animalia
- Phylum: Chordata
- Class: Reptilia
- Order: Squamata
- Family: Gymnophthalmidae
- Genus: Pholidobolus
- Species: P. affinis

Binomial name
- Pholidobolus affinis (Peters, 1863)

Species of lizard

Pholidobolus affinis, Peters's pholiodobolus, is a species of lizard in the family Gymnophthalmidae. It is endemic to Ecuador.
