= Pholidobolus paramuno =

Scientific classification
- Kingdom: Animalia
- Phylum: Chordata
- Order: Squamata
- Family: Gymnophthalmidae
- Genus: Pholidobolus
- Species: P. paramuno

Binomial name
- Pholidobolus paramuno Hurtado-Gómez, Arredondo, Sales-Nunes, & Daza, 2018

Species of lizard

Pholidobolus paramuno is a species of lizard in the family Gymnophthalmidae. It is endemic to Colombia.
