= Pholidobolus dicrus =

Scientific classification
- Kingdom: Animalia
- Phylum: Chordata
- Class: Reptilia
- Order: Squamata
- Family: Gymnophthalmidae
- Genus: Pholidobolus
- Species: P. dicrus

Binomial name
- Pholidobolus dicrus (Uzzell, 1973)

Species of lizard

Pholidobolus dicrus, Uzzell's pholiodobolus, is a species of lizard in the family Gymnophthalmidae. It is endemic to Ecuador.
