= Pholidobolus argosi =

Scientific classification
- Kingdom: Animalia
- Phylum: Chordata
- Order: Squamata
- Family: Gymnophthalmidae
- Genus: Pholidobolus
- Species: P. argosi

Binomial name
- Pholidobolus argosi Amézquita, Mazariegos, Cañaveral, Orejuela, Barragán-Contreras, & Daza, 2023

Species of lizard

Pholidobolus argosi is a species of lizard in the family Gymnophthalmidae. It was formally described in 2023 and is named after the Grupo Argos Foundation. They have brown dorsums, a cream, pale brown, or white vertebral stripe, brown sides, and pink to pale orange bellies and throats. The species is currently known from the hilltops of the Colombian Western Andes, near the municipalities of Andes and Caramanta, within the department of Antioquia. They are seen in leaf litter in elfin forests and secondary forests at the edge of cloud forests. It has not yet been assessed by the IUCN, but the scientists describing it recommended it be considered endangered.

== Taxonomy ==
Pholidobolus argosi was formally described in 2023 based on an adult male specimen collected from the Mesenia-Paramillo Nature Reserve in the Antioquia Department, Colombia. It was named after the Grupo Argos Foundation, which works in the fields of education and environmental restoration.

== Description ==
The dorsum is brown, bisected by a mid-dorsal stripe that is cream, pale brown, or white, extending from the head to the base of the tail. The vertebral stripe is bordered by darker, usually black, stripes. On the head, the pale stripe extends from the first supralabial to the shoulder, dorsally reaching the rostral scale, and laterally bordering the supraocular and parietal scales. The sides of the neck, flanks, and limbs are predominantly brown, usually with less than ten white ocelli, bordered by a black stripe. There is a white or cream lateral line from the supralabials to the shoulder. There is another cream and interrupted lateral stripe, running between the insertions of fore and hind limbs, not extending towards the tail. The throat is pink to cream. The chest, belly and base of the tail are pink to pale orange, often with black blotches, which are apparently more common in adult males.

== Distribution and ecology ==
The species is currently known from the hilltops of the western Andes, near the municipalities of Andes and Caramanta, within the department of Antioquia. Most specimens were seen amongst the leaf litter of elfin forests; some were collected on secondary forests at the edge of cloud forests. Its distribution seems to be very patchy, known presently from fewer than five locations and an area of less than 500 km^{2}.

The species seems to be heliothermic: within minutes of the sun appearing, specimens came out of the leaf litter, remained exposed, and extended their ribs increasing the dorsal surface available for sunlight capture. Under sunny conditions, several individuals could be seen at once in at least two of the spots from where the species is known. Many individuals showed signs of a regenerated tail.

== Conservation ==
Pholidobolus argosi has not been assessed by the IUCN, but the authors of the study describing the species recommended that the species be considered endangered. The cloud and elfin forests it inhabits are severely fragmented in the area, and remain mainly as small patches on hilltops, which are preserved to protect water sources for crops downhill.
