= Intellark =

Arabic keyboard layout

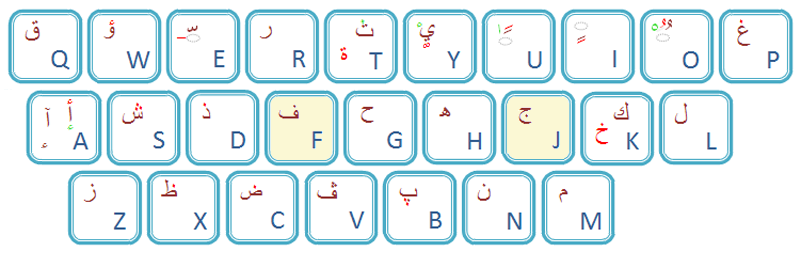
Intellark QWERTY keyboard layout

Intellark is an Arabic keyboard layout for intuitive typing in Arabic. It was designed and patented by the Canadian company Intellaren. It is specifically designed for keyboard typists who type using QWERTY-based keyboard layouts.

== Intellark mechanics ==
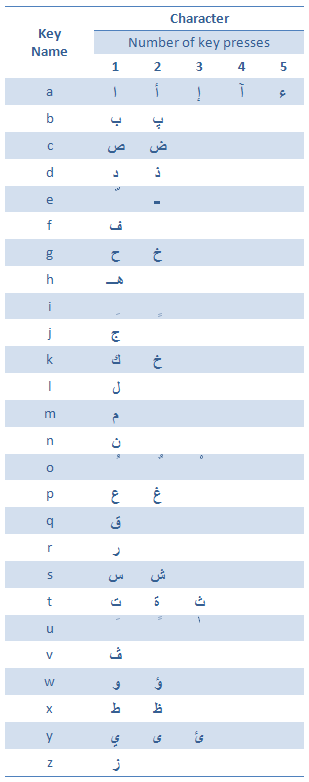
Intellark full map from the English keyboard letters to Arabic characters.

Unlike linear one-to-one keyboard layouts that typically map a single character to each key, Intellark is a one-to-many keyboard layout that maps one or more characters (Arabic letters and diacritics) to each key on a typical keyboard, where the second and beyond-second characters are produced as a function of key pressed and key timing. If the time difference between presses of the key is within tolerance (e.g., 300 milliseconds or less), the current character is replaced by another one that is of lesser frequency but is logically and intuitively related to the main key character.

=== Examples ===
- To type ت, press t.
- To type ة as in ذرة or جنة, type t twice very rapidly.
- To type ث, you may either press t three times, or simply press T (i.e., Shift+t). Therefore, holding down the Shift key while pressing a certain key continuously accesses the adjacency list associated with that key in reverse order.
- For Key t's adjacency list, ت is placed before ة because of its higher frequency, which is in turn placed before ث for the same reason.
