= IMFI =

Writing system in which letters' shapes vary

IMFI is an acronym for "Initial, Medial, Final, Isolated", a writing system in which each character has four different potential shapes:

- initial – used for the first character in a word
- medial – used in the middle of a word
- final – used for the last character in a word
- isolated – used for single-letter words

The Arabic, Mandaic, Manichaean, Mongolian, N'Ko, and Syriac scripts are examples of IMFI writing systems.
