= Scheherazade New =

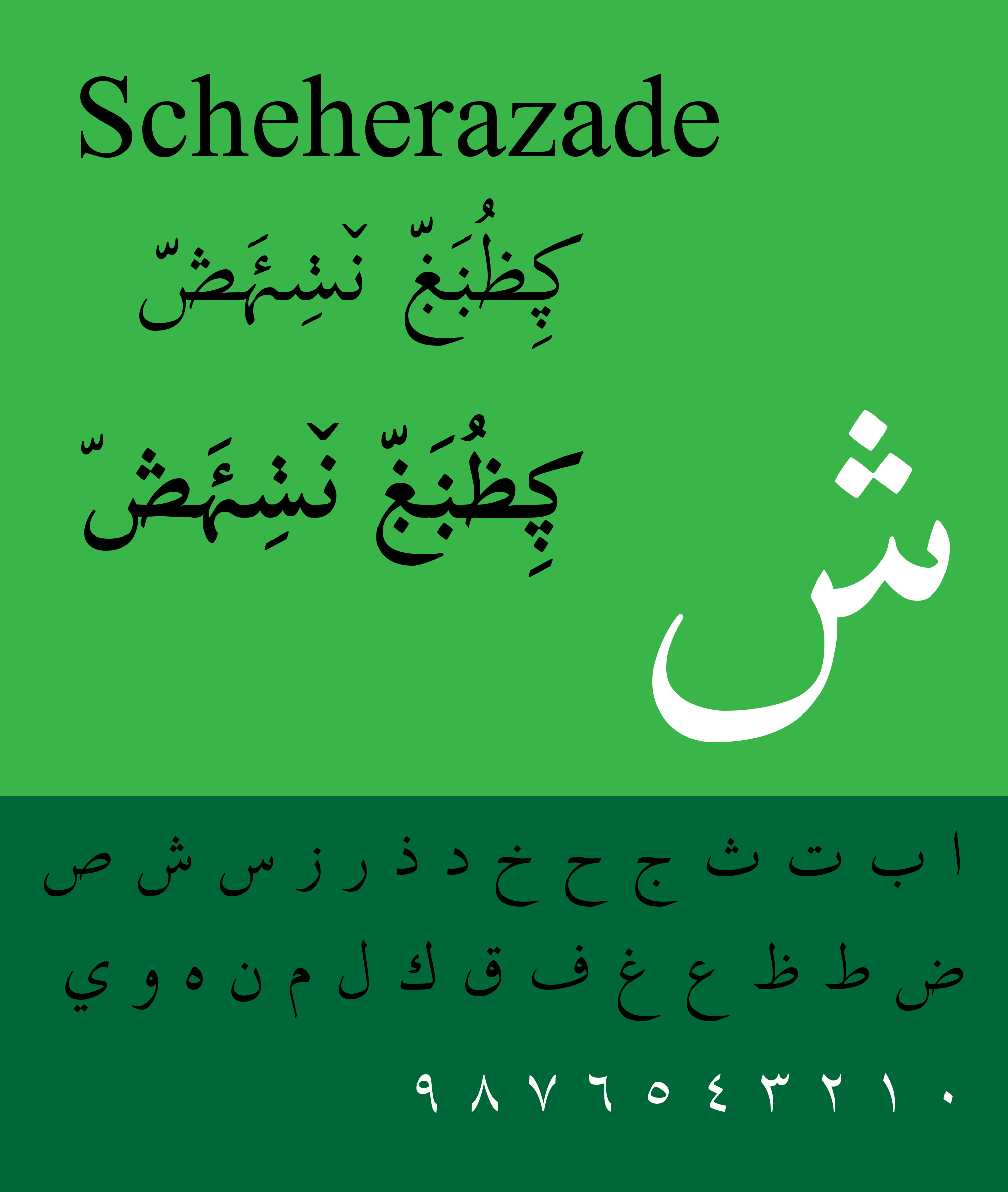
- Category: Naskh
- Designer: SIL International
- Date released: 2015
- License: SIL Open Font License

Scheherazade New, formerly Scheherazade, is a traditional Naskh styled font for Arabic script created by SIL, freely available under the Open Font License. It supports a wide range of Arabic-based writing system encoded in Unicode. The font offers two family members: regular and bold.

Scheherazade New supports Graphite and OpenType technologies for contextual shaping, ligatures, and dynamic diacritics positioning, also provides advanced rendering features including localized forms, character variants. It is licensed under the SIL Open Font License (OFL), and can be downloaded free of charge.

== Demonstration ==
Comparison of both versions at 400% size
Scheherazade New	ـݢـ ـࢴـ ـݣـ ـࢰـ
Scheherazade	ـݢـ ـࢴـ ـݣـ ـࢰـ
SF Arabic	ـݢـ ـࢴـ ـݣـ ـࢰـ

The newer version was eventually expanded for a complete Arabic coverage and should be as complete as the earlier version. Notice that the earlier depricated version looks smaller. SF Arabic is here to demonstrate how the letters are supposed to look like; available to Apple users and has a complete Arabic coverage.

For this demonstration to succeed, you need to install both fonts or import them from the web. Scheherazade is already a Wikimedia font, while Scheherazade New is available on Google Fonts.

== See also ==
- Naskh script
