= Oro (name) =

Oro is a Spanish-language name literally meaning "gold". It may be a given name, a nickname or a surname. Notable people with the name include:

- Oro (wrestler), Jesús Javier Hernández Solís (1971–1993), Mexican professional wrestler
- Alfredo de Oro (1863–1948), Cuban billiards and pool player
- Faustino Oro (*2013), Argentinian chess player
- Joan Oró (1923–2004), Catalan (Spanish) biochemist
- Juan Bustillo Oro (1904–1989), Mexican film director, screenwriter and producer
- Luis Oro, Spanish chemist and professor
