= El Oro =

El Oro may refer to several places:

- El Oro Province, Ecuador
- El Oro Municipality, Mexico State, Mexico
- El Oro Municipality, Durango, Mexico
- El Oro District, Antabamba, Peru

== See also ==
- Oro (disambiguation)
