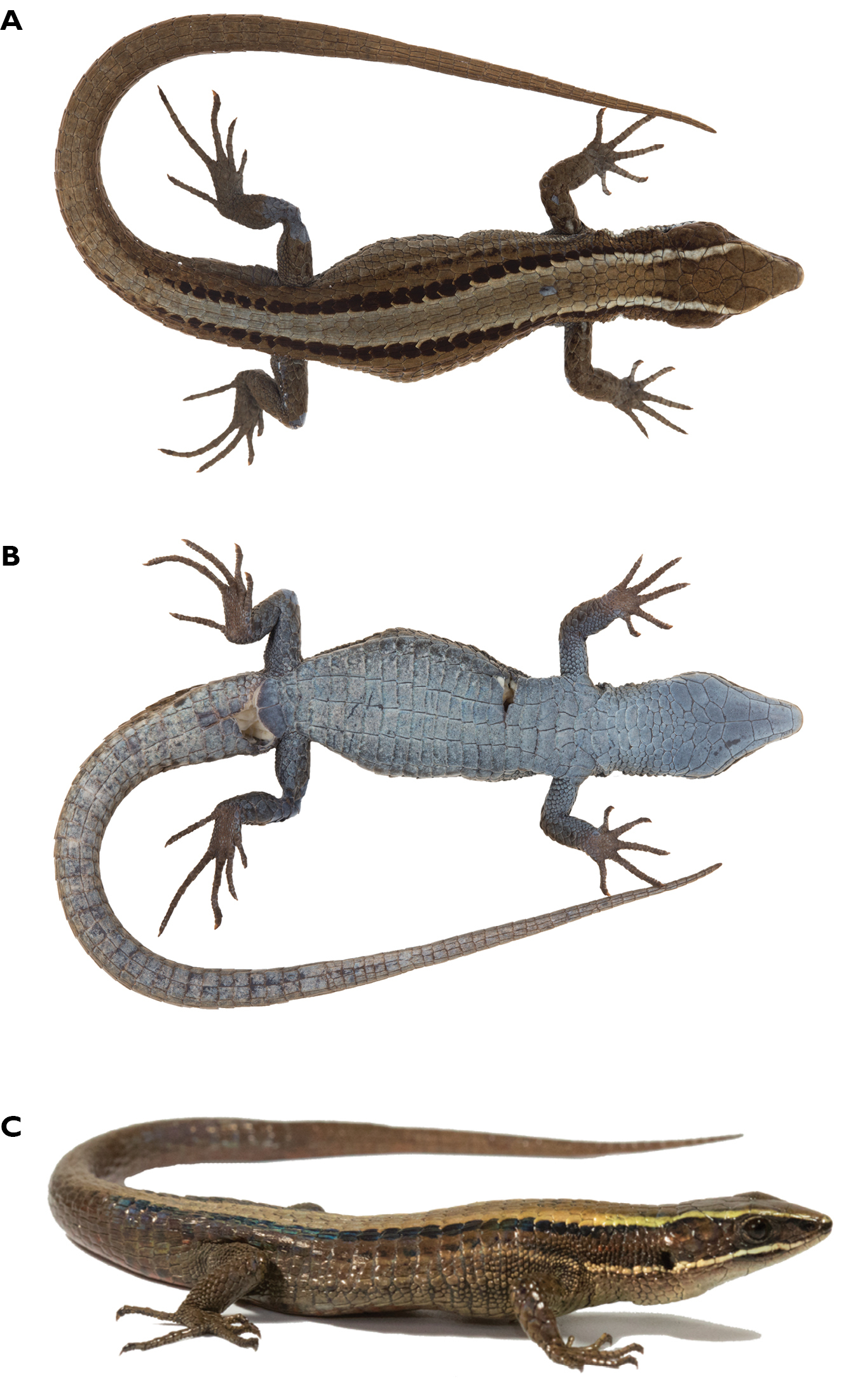

Scientific classification
- Kingdom: Animalia
- Phylum: Chordata
- Class: Reptilia
- Order: Squamata
- Family: Gymnophthalmidae
- Genus: Pholidobolus
- Species: P. samek

Binomial name
- Pholidobolus samek Parra, Sales–Nunes, & Torres-Carvajal, 2020

= Pholidobolus samek =

Species of lizard

Pholidobolus samek is a species of lizard in the family Gymnophthalmidae. Formally described in 2020, it is named after the green dorsolateral stripes on its head, with its name meaning green in the indigenous Shuar language. It inhabits cloud forests in Cordillera del Cóndor in southeastern Ecuador at elevations of 2324−2844 m and is known only from the Zamora-Chinchipe province. The authors of the study describing the species recommended that the species be considered critically endangered due to its small known distribution and habitat destruction.

== Taxonomy ==
Pholidobolus samek was formally described in 2020 based on an adult male specimen collected from the Cerro Plateado Biological Reserve in the Zamora-Chinchipe Province, Ecuador. The specific epithet samek means green in the indigenous Shuar language, in allusion to the green dorsolateral head stripes distinguishing the new species from Pholidobolus species. The species has the English common name green-striped cuilane and the Spanish common name Cuilane de franjas verdes.

== Description ==
The adult male holotype has a grayish-brown dorsal background from the head to the base of tail, with a golden light brown vertebral stripe extending from the occiput to the tail. There are bright green dorsolateral stripes on the head. There is a cream-white longitudinal stripe extending from the first supralabial to the shoulder. The sides of the neck, flanks and limbs are dark brown, with a reddish-brown narrow stripe extending from the tympanum to the arm insertion. The ventrolateral region of the body is grayish-brown. The throat is cream and the chest, belly, and base of the tail are cream-orange. Unlike the male holotype, females have an orange-brown longitudinal stripe extending from third supralabial to shoulder and fading on the flanks.

== Distribution and ecology ==
Pholidobolus samek inhabits cloud forests in Cordillera del Cóndor in southeastern Ecuador at elevations of 2324−2844 m. The species is known only from Zamora-Chinchipe province, on the sandstone plateaus of the Cerro Plateado Biological Reserve. The ground at the type locality is covered with mosses, roots, and bromeliads, a habitat known locally as bamba. All specimens were found active from 11:30–17:00 under stones or terrestrial bromeliads.

Eggs of the species have been collected under flat stones. In captivity, they have been incubated in sphagnum and perlite. Eggs are 14.0–14.1 mm long, 8.0–8.5 mm wide, and weigh 0.4 g on average. Hatchlings weigh 0.3 g and are 24.7 mm in snout–vent length on average.

== Conservation ==
Pholidobolus samek has not been assessed by the IUCN, but the authors of the study describing the species recommended that the species be considered critically endangered due to its small known distribution and habitat destruction through mining activities near its known range.
