= Echegaray Medal =

Scientific award of the Spanish Royal Academy of Sciences

The Echegaray Medal (Spanish: La Medalla Echegaray) is the highest scientific award granted by the Spanish Royal Academy of Sciences. The award was created by Alfonso XIII at the request of Santiago Ramón y Cajal after the award of the Nobel Prize to José Echegaray and is awarded in recognition of an exceptional scientific career.

The first time it was granted was in 1907 to the eponymous José Echegaray. More than a hundred years after the award was created, the first woman to receive the Echegaray Medal was Margarita Salas in 2016 during a ceremony which was presided over by Juan Carlos I and Queen Sofía of Spain.

== Past recipients ==
- 1907 José Echegaray
- 1910 Eduardo Saavedra
- 1913 SAS el Príncipe Alberto I de Mónaco
- 1916 Leonardo Torres Quevedo
- 1919 Svante Arrhenius
- 1922 Santiago Ramón y Cajal
- 1925 Hendrik Antoon Lorentz
- 1928 Ignacio Bolívar
- 1931 Ernest Rutherford
- 1934 Joaquín María de Castellarnau
- 1968 Obdulio Fernández
- 1975 José María Otero de Navascués
- 1979 José García Santesmases
- 1998 Manuel Lora Tamayo
- 2016 Margarita Salas
- 2018 Mariano Barbacid
- 2020 Francisco Guinea
- 2022 José A. Carrillo
- 2025 Luis Oro
