= Margarita Salas =

Spanish biochemist

The Most Excellent Margarita Salas
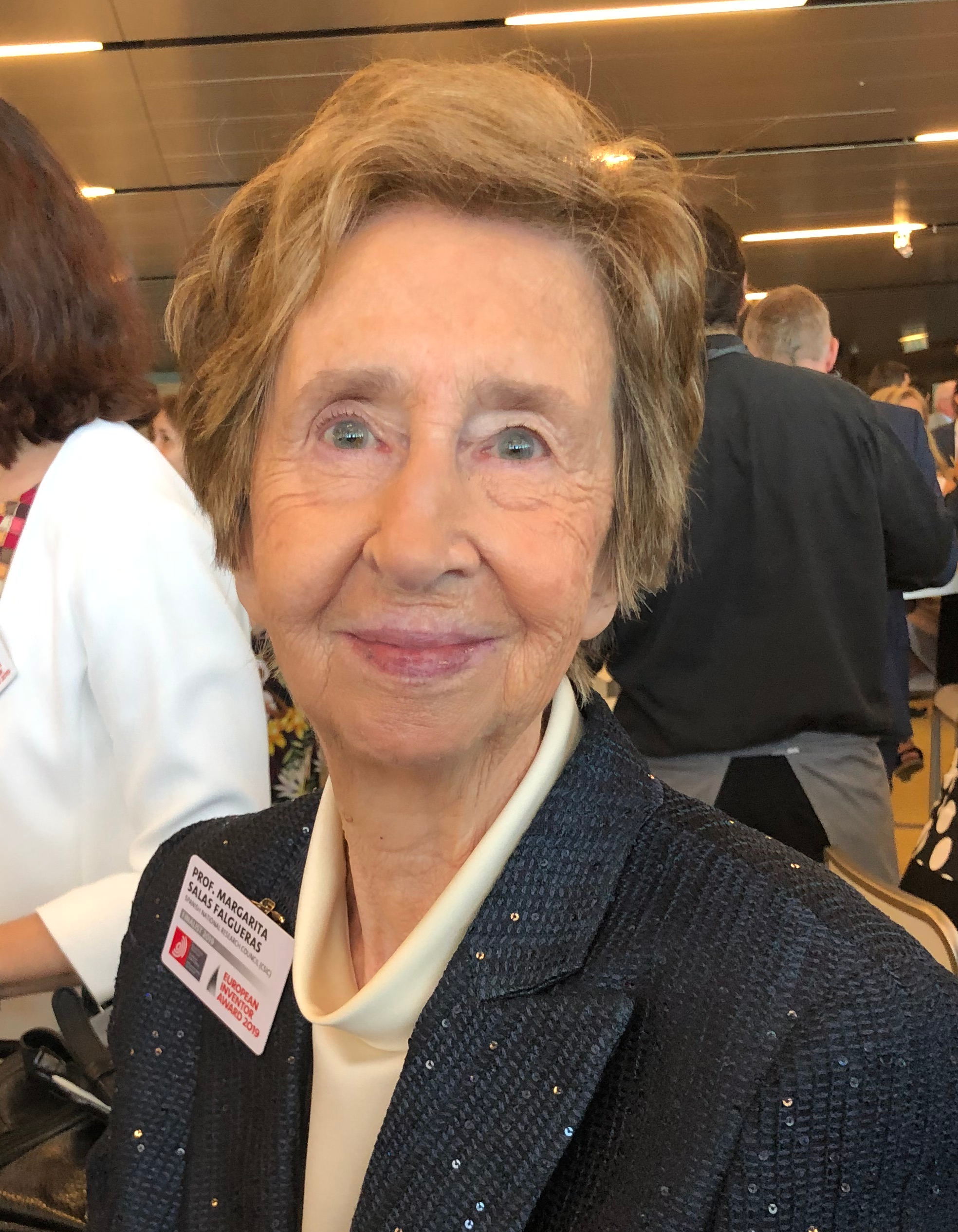
- Salas in June 2019
- Born: 30 November 1938; Valdés (Asturias), Spain
- Died: 7 November 2019 (aged 80); Madrid, Spain
- Education: Complutense University of Madrid
- Known for: Studies of molecular genetics and discovery of Φ29 DNA polymerase
- Spouse: Eladio Viñuela [es] (m. 1963)
- Awards: Premio México de Ciencia y Tecnología (1998); European Inventor Award (2019)
- Scientific career
- Doctoral advisor: Alberto Sols

Seat i of the Real Academia Española
- In office 4 June 2003 (Note: Elected on 20 December 2001) – 7 November 2019
- Preceded by: José García Nieto
- Succeeded by: Paloma Díaz-Mas

Margarita Salas Falgueras, 1st Marchioness of Canero (30 November 1938 – 7 November 2019) was a Spanish scientist, medical researcher, and author in the fields of biochemistry and molecular genetics.

She started developing molecular biology in Spain and also worked as an honorary associate professor of CSIC, at the Severo Ochoa Biology Center (UAM). In 2016 she became the first woman ever to receive the Echegaray Medal, that was given to her by the Royal Academy of Exact, Physical and Natural Sciences (Real Academia de Ciencias Exactas, Físicas y Naturales).

Salas' discovery of the bacterial virus Φ29 DNA polymerase was recognized by the Spanish National Research Council as the highest-grossing patent in Spain. Her cumulative work, as described by The Local in 2019, "invented a faster, simpler and more reliable way to replicate trace amounts of DNA into quantities large enough for full genomic testing."

She was the first scientific woman ever elected to the Royal Spanish Academy. Shortly before her death, she was awarded the 2019 European Inventor Award. Salas was raised into the Spanish nobility by King Juan Carlos I in Summer 2008 with the hereditary title of Marchioness of Canero. Throughout her career in academia, she advised more than 40 doctoral students and published over 200 scientific articles. She was an outspoken advocate of women and feminism in science.

== Early life and career ==
Margarita Salas Falgueras was born on 30 November 1938 in Canero, a parish of Valdés, Asturias, Spain. She was the daughter of José Salas Martínez (1905–1962), a psychiatric doctor who influenced her, encouraging her interest in science, and Margarita Falgueras Gatell (1912/1913-2014), a teacher. She had two brothers who were also scientists: José Salas Falgueras (1937–2008) and María Luisa "Marisa" Salas Falgueras. At the age of sixteen she went to Madrid to carry out the Chemistry and Medicine entrance tests. She entered the faculty of Chemistry and in the summer of 1958 met Severo Ochoa, who had influence on her career and oriented her towards biochemistry. She graduated from the Complutense University of Madrid with a B.A. in chemistry and obtained a PhD degree in 1963, with Alberto Sols (of the Spanish National Research Council) as doctoral supervisor.

After finishing their thesis, in August 1964, she travelled to the United States with her husband, Eladio Viñuela, whom she married in 1963, to work with Severo Ochoa. On their return to Spain, Salas and her husband established a laboratory to research molecular biology at the Center for Biological Research in Madrid. Viñuela began a different field of research in 1970, studying the African plague virus, so that Salas would be recognised on her own merits. Salas was a professor of molecular genetics at the Complutense University Faculty of Chemistry from 1968 to 1992. She was also a professor of research at the Severo Ochoa Center for Molecular Biology in Madrid from 1974, and its director from 1992 until January 1994.

She was president of the Spanish Society of Biochemistry (SEBBM) from 1988 until 1992. She then served as the director of the Foundation for Biomedical Research at the Gregorio Marañón Hospital (2001–2004), and of the Institute of Spain (1995–2003). She was responsible for promoting Spanish research in the fields of biochemistry and molecular biology. She was an honorary professor at the Spanish National Research Council (CSIC) in the field of biotechnology.

On November 7, 2019, she died of a cardiac arrest after a complication of a digestive ailment from which she was to be operated.

== Scientific career ==
Salas was the first scientific woman elected in the Royal Spanish Academy. She was appointed on 20 December 2001, and took up her seat on 4 June 2003. On 11 July 2008, Salas was raised into the Spanish nobility by King Juan Carlos I with the hereditary title of Marchioness of Canero. She supervised more than 40 doctoral students and published over 200 scientific articles.

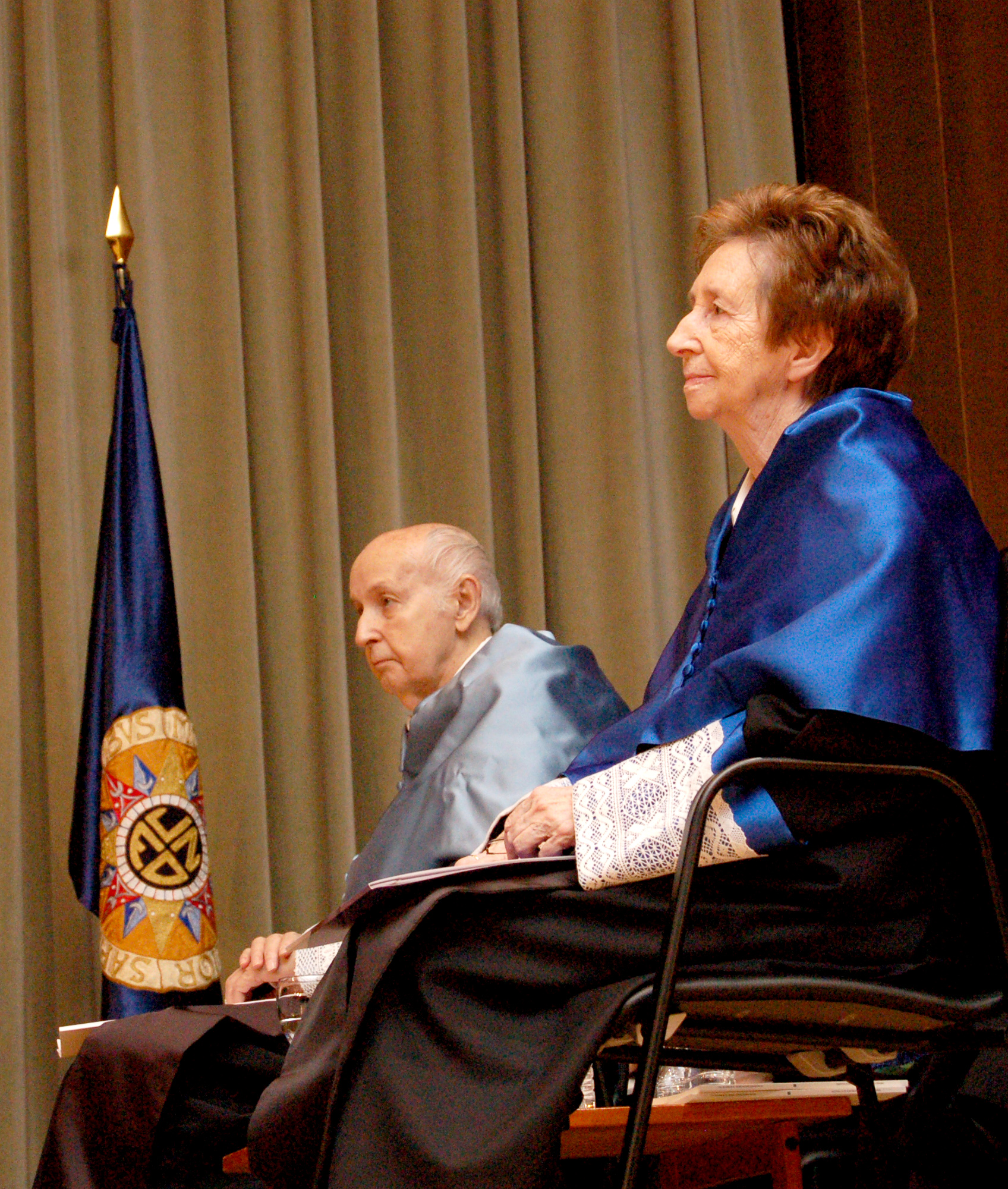
Margarita Salas receiving the honoris causa honor by UNED, 2011

=== Early work ===
After obtaining an undergraduate degree in chemistry, Margarita Salas joined the laboratory of Alberto Sols, where she completed her doctoral thesis on the anomeric specificity of glucose-6-phosphate isomerase. She then worked as a postdoctoral researcher in the United States for three years (1964–1967) at New York University with Severo Ochoa.

=== Bacterial virus Φ29 DNA polymerase ===
During her time in Ochoa's laboratory, Salas determined that messenger RNA is read from its N-terminus (5' end) to its C-terminus (3' end) and she described how protein synthesis is started. She also discovered and characterized the Φ29 phage DNA polymerase, which has biotechnological applications due to its high DNA amplification properties. Her research allowed trace amounts of DNA to be replicated more quickly and reliably, making DNA analysis accessible in fields such as archaeology and forensics, where only trace amounts may be retrieved, and in oncology. The method is now called multiple displacement amplification.

In 2012 she was professor ad honorem at the Center for Molecular Biology Severo Ochoa, CSIC's research center and the Autonomous University of Madrid (UAM), where she continued to work on the bacterial virus Φ29, which infects a non-pathogenic bacterium Bacillus subtilis.

== Scientific activity ==
Salas published more than three hundred and fifty publications in international magazines or books and about ten in national media. She also has 8 patents, and presented papers at 398 conferences and seminars. The patent relating to her discovery of Φ29 generated more royalties for the Spanish National Research Council than any of its other patents, with 50% of its patent royalty income between 2003 and 2009 deriving from it.

== Recognition during her scientific career ==
Salas took part on some of the most prestigious scientific societies and institutes nationally and internationally. She was awarded with the Rey Jaime I Research Award in 1994. She was the director of the Instituto de España (Institute of Spain) in the period 1995–2003.

She also directed the Severo Ochoa Foundation y and the annual course of the School of Molecular Biology “Eladio Viñuela” of the Menéndez Pelayo International University in Santander.

She was a member of the Royal Academy of Exact, Physical and Natural Science, of the Royal Spanish Academy, of the European Academy of Sciences and Arts, and of the American Academy of Arts and Sciences, among others.

In addition, she was named honorary doctorate by the following universities: Rey Juan Carlos, University of Oviedo, Extremadura, Murcia, Politécnica de Madrid, Jaén, Cádiz, Málaga, UNED university, University of Menéndez Pelayo International, Carlos III of Madrid, Burgos, Universidad Autónoma of Barcelona.

In 1992 a Secondary Education Institute in Majadahonda (Community of Madrid) was named in honour of Margarita Salas. Currently there is another Institute of Secondary Education called the same in Seseña (Toledo).

She was the "adopted daughter" (hija adoptiva) of the Council of Valdés (Asturias) since 1997, and of Gijón since 2004.

In May 2007, she was elected to the National Academy of Sciences of the United States, thus becoming the first Spanish woman to join the institution.

In December 2018, the name change of the Eliseo Godoy school (Franco's teacher and military) from Zaragoza to Margarita Salas was approved.

In 2019 she was awarded, posthumously, with the Gold Medal of Merit in Research and University Education. That same year the CSIC Biological Research Center was renamed the Margarita Salas Biological Research Center.

== Her role as a woman in science ==
In 2020, a new species of gastropod discovered in waters of the Canary islands, Rissoella salasae, was named after her.

Salas was known for her work as a mentor of many scientists such as María Blasco, Marisol Soengas and Jesús Ávila de Grado.

A Baleària ferry for Mallorca was named after her in 2024.

== Personal life ==
In 1963, she married Eladio Viñuela [es]. Salas and Viñuela had one daughter. She was reported as saying that she delayed motherhood until she was 37, when she felt that she could combine both professional and family life. She died on 7 November 2019 in Madrid aged 80.

== Awards and honors ==
Salas won the L'Oréal-UNESCO Awards for Women in Science in its first year, 2000. She was a member of Spanish Royal Academy of Sciences, European Academy of Sciences and Arts, American Academy of Arts and Sciences, American Academy of Microbiology, United States National Academy of Sciences, and the Severo Ochoa Foundation. She was awarded honorary doctorates by the University of Oviedo, University of Extremadura, University of Murcia and the University of Cádiz.

- 1991: Carlos J. Finlay Prize, UNESCO
- 1997: Medal of Principality of Asturias.
- 1999: National Research Award Santiago Ramon y Cajal.
- 2000: L'Oreal-UNESCO Award for Women in Science
- 2001: Selected among the 100 women of the twentieth century that paved the way for equality in the XXI Century by the Council of Women of the Community of Madrid.
- 2002: Isabel Ferrer Award of the Generalitat Valenciana.
- 2002: Gold Medal of the Community of Madrid.
- 2003: Grand Cross of the Civil Order of Alfonso X, the Wise.
- 2004: International Prize for Science and Research Cristóbal Gabarrón Foundation.
- 2005: Gold Medal for Merit in Work.
- 2005: Medal of Honor of the Complutense University of Madrid.
- 2006: Award of Excellence granted by FEDEPE (Spanish Federation of Women Directors, Executives, Professionals and Entrepreneurs).
- 2007: First Spanish woman to become a member of the National Academy of Sciences (United States).
- 2009: Gold Medal of the College of Veterinarians of the Principality of Asturias.
- 2009: Title of Honorary Ambassador of the Spain Brand, category of Science and Innovation, which fails Leading Brands of Spanish Forum with the approval of the Ministry of Foreign Affairs and Cooperation.
- 2009: Women Leader Award 2009, awarded by the Rafael del Pino, Aliter and Merck Foundation.
- 2009: Award "An entire professional life" of the Mapfre Foundation.
- 2014: Chemistry Excellence Award, awarded by the General Council of Associations of Chemists of Spain.
- 2016: Medalla Echegaray, the highest award from the Spanish Royal Academy of Sciences
- 2017: Nature's Lifelong Mentoring Award
- 2018: ManchaArte Award 2018
- 2019: European Inventor Award Lifetime Achievement Award and Audience Award by European Patent Office

== See also ==
- List of female scientists in the 21st century
- List of Spanish inventors and discoverers

== Notes ==
Spanish nobility
New title	Marchioness of Canero; 11 July 2008 – 7 November 2019	Succeeded by Lucía Viñuela Salas
