= María Blasco Marhuenda =

Spanish molecular biologist (born 1965)

María Blasco
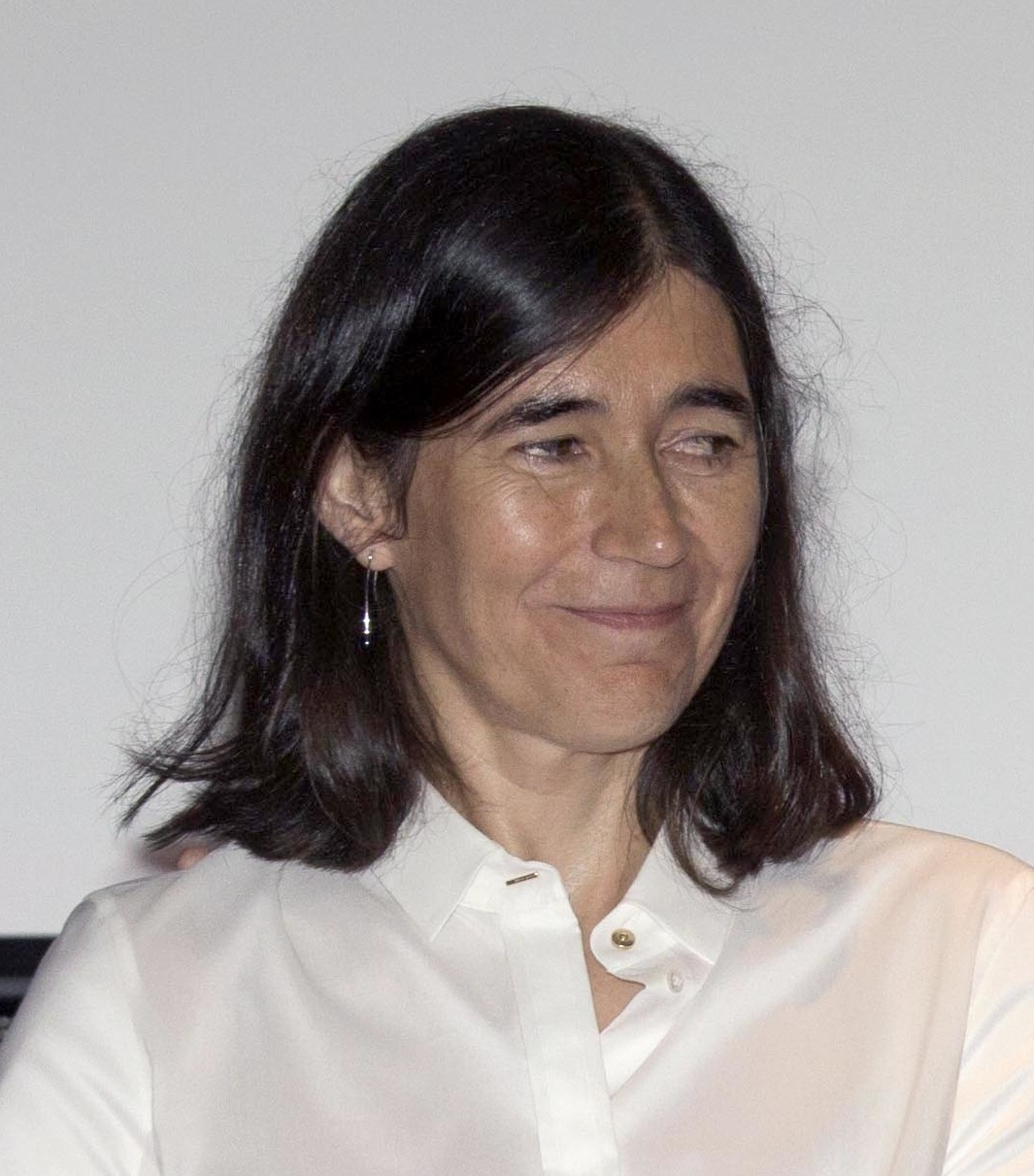
- Born: María Antonia Blasco Marhuenda; 1965 (age 60–61); Alicante, Spain
- Education: Universidad de Valencia, BSc Universidad Autónoma de Madrid, PhD
- Awards: EMBO Gold Medal (2004)
- Scientific career
- Fields: Molecular biology
- Workplaces: Spanish National Cancer Research Centre
- Thesis: Estudios de la relación estructura-función en DNA polimerasa DNA-dependiente del bacteriófago ø29 (1993)

María Antonia Blasco Marhuenda (born 1965), known as María Blasco, is a Spanish molecular biologist. She was the director of the Spanish National Cancer Research Centre (Centro Nacional de Investigaciones Oncológicas, CNIO) from June 22, 2011 to January 29, 2025. Her research focuses on telomeres, telomerase, and their relationship with aging and cancer.

== Life ==
Blasco was born in 1965. She graduated in Biological Sciences from the University of Valencia in 1988. She obtained her PhD in 1993 for her research at the Centro de Biología Molecular Severo Ochoa (UAM-CSIC), under the supervision of Margarita Salas. Her doctoral thesis was titled Estudios de la relación estructura-función en DNA polimerasa DNA-dependiente del bacteriófago ø29. That same year, Blasco joined the Cold Spring Harbor Laboratory in New York (USA) as a Postdoctoral Fellow under the leadership of Carol W. Greider (who was to win a Nobel Prize in 2009). While there, Blasco cloned one of the genes for mammalian telomerase and generated the first knockout mouse for telomerase.

In 1997, she returned to Spain to start her own research at the Centro Nacional de Biotecnología in Madrid. She worked there as a group leader and CSIC scientist in the Department of Immunology and Oncology. She joined the Centro Nacional de Investigaciones Oncológicas (CNIO) in 2003 as Director of the Molecular Oncology Programme and Leader of the Telomeres and Telomerase Group.

In 2005, she was also assigned as Vice-Director of Basic Research, and, in 2011, she was appointed as CNIO Director, replacing Mariano Barbacid.

In 2010, Blasco co-founded Life Length, a biotech company, along with entrepreneur Stephen J. Matlin. More recently, she founded the startup Telomere Therapeutics, initially with the aim of developing a telomerase-based gene therapy for pulmonary fibrosis.

In December 2024, 23 research group leaders at the CNIO called for Blasco's removal, criticizing her management and the resources available for basic research. Blasco said that responsibility for the CNIO's finances and contracting lay with its managing director, Juan Arroyo. She said that she shared researchers' concerns about insufficient resources and low salaries and announced her intention to seek an audit of the center from the Ombudsman of Spain. The CNIO board subsequently declined to approve the center's 2025 action plan, requested an "exhaustive explanation" of its situation, and suspended activities of the CNIO-Arte program.

On January 29, 2025, the CNIO board dismissed both Blasco and Arroyo from their positions. In November 2025, El Mundo reported allegations that Arroyo had diverted more than €20 million through irregular contracts involving a network of companies connected to his circle. Blasco said that she had asked the CNIO board in 2022 to dismiss Arroyo and argued that she had been made a scapegoat for matters that were outside her responsibilities. In March 2026, she was named the Monte-Carlo Woman of the Year at the Monaco Women Forum.

== Research ==
- Isolation of the core components of mouse telomerase and generation of the first knockout mouse for telomerase;
- Generation of the first mouse with increased telomerase expression in adult tissues;
- The finding that mammalian telomeres and subtelomeres have epigenetic marks characteristic of constitutive heterochromatin;
- Discovery of telomeric RNAs, which are potent telomerase-inhibitors whose expression is altered in cancer;
- Demonstration that telomerase activity and telomere length determine the regenerative capacity of adult stem cells;
- Identification of the longest telomeres as a universal feature of adult stem cell niches;
- The finding that telomerase overexpression in the context of cancer resistant-mice improves organismal fitness, produces a systemic delay in ageing and an extension in median life-span;
- Discovery that telomeres rejuvenate after nuclear reprogramming;
- Identification of the molecular mechanisms by which short telomeres/DNA damage limit nuclear reprogramming of defective cells;
- Discovery that telomeric protein TRF1 can act as both a tumour suppressor and as a factor in ageing prevention.

== Professional experience ==
- 2011– 2025 Director Spanish National Cancer Research Centre (Centro Nacional de Investigaciones Oncológicas, CNIO)
- 2005–2011 Vice-Director of Basic Research (CNIO)
- 2003–2011 Director, Molecular Oncology Program (CNIO)
- 2003–present Head, Telomeres and Telomerase Group (CNIO)
- 1997–2003 Staff Investigator, National Center of Biotechnology, Madrid, Spain
- 1993–1996 Postdoctoral Fellow, Cold Spring Harbor Laboratory, New York, USA. supervisor Dr. Carol. W. Greider
- 1992–1993 Postoctoral Fellow, Center of Molecular Biology, Madrid, Spain. supervisor Dr. Margarita Salas
- 1989–1992 Graduate Fellow, Center of Molecular Biology, Madrid, Spain supervisor Dr. Margarita Salas

== Honours and awards ==
- 2021 - Progressive Women of Retirement Award in its IV edition.
- 2019 - Optimist Award Committed to Science awarded by the magazine Anoche Tuve un Sueño
- 2018 - In 2018 it was included in the Periodic Table of Scientists to commemorate in 2019 the International Year of the Periodic Table of Chemical Elements, to celebrate the 150th anniversary of Mendeleev's publication.
- 2017 - Distinction from the Generalitat Valenciana for Scientific Merit, 14th Balmis Rotary Club Alicante Award,
- 2016 - Women to Follow Award 2016, in the category Special Award for Excellence in scientific dissemination.
- 2013 - Fellow of the Royal Academy of Pharmacy of Spain
- 2012 - Member of the Scientific Board of the AXA Research Fund
- 2012 - Member of the Scientific Board of the Vall d’Hebron Institut de Recerca (VHIR)
- 2012 - Member of the Board of Trustees and President of the External Advisory Board of the Spanish National Centre for Research on Ageing (CNIE)
- 2012 - Pezcoller Foundation-AACR International Award for Cancer Research Selection Committee
- 2012 - Official Nominator for the "2014 Japan Prize" awarded by The Japan Prize Foundation, Japan
- 2012 - Spanish Ministry of Foreign Affairs and International Cooperation "Embajadora Honoraria de la Marca España-2013"
- 2012 - Santiago Grisolía Chair 2012 in Biomedicine and Neurosciences, Spain
- 2011 - 2011 Award in Innovation and Social Transformation, Fundación IDEAS, España.
- 2011 - Fundación Pilates VIIth Edition "Health & Wellbeing" Award, Spain
- 2011 - Universidad Autónoma de Madrid Alumni Association Award, Spain
- 2011 - VIth Yo Donna International Award in Professional Achievements
- 2010 - National Research Award Santiago Ramón y Cajal
- 2010 - Lilly Foundation Preclinical Research Award
- 2009 - Prize "Alberto Sols" for Excellence in Research
- 2008 - Körber European Science Award
- 2007 - Rey Jaime I Prize for Basic Research
- 2005 - Carmen and Severo Ochoa Award in Molecular Biology
- 2004 - EMBO Gold Medal Heidelberg.
- 2004 - The Carcinogenesis Young Investigator Award
- 2003 - Josef Steiner Cancer Research Award 2003.
- 2003 - "Universalia" Research Award 2003
- 2002 - "EMBO Lecture" Award at ELSO Meeting 2002
- 2002 - Early Career Award 2002. European Life Sciences Organization (ELSO).
- 2002 - "Young Cancer Researcher Award" European Association for Cancer Research (EACR)
- 2001 - SEBBM Beckman/Coulter Award 2001
- 2001 - Award of the Spanish Health Science Foundation for excellence in Biomedical Research
- 2000 - Swiss Bridge Award 2000 for Research in Cancer
- 2000 - FEBS Anniversary Prize
- 1999 - II Spanish National Oncology Award (Echevarne)

== Publications ==
- More than 200 articles, see MA Blasco at Google Scholar
