= Centre of Biological Research (Spain) =

Spanish research centre

The Centre of Biological Research (Spanish: Centro de Investigaciones Biológicas) is a leading research centre in Spain, specialising in molecular genetics. It belongs to the Spanish National Research Council (CSIC).

Created in 1958, the centre leads Spanish and European research in the fields of biology and biomedicine. Set up under the auspices of Nobel laureate Santiago Ramón y Cajal, its first director was Gregorio Marañon. Leading scientists associated with the centre include Mariano Barbacid.

Originally located in the centre of Madrid, its new facilities at the Complutense University of Madrid campus were inaugurated on 26 January 2004 by Her Royal Highness Infanta Cristina, Duchess of Palma de Mallorca.

== Research areas ==
The centre is divided into five departments corresponding to the scientific areas they specialise in:

- Cellular and developmental biology
- Plant biology
- Protein science
- Cellular and molecular physiopathology
- Molecular microbiology

With 90 staff scientists and some 500 pre-and postdoctoral research fellows, technical and administrative staff, it has a high output in leading English-and Spanish language scientific reviews.
