= Life Length =

Spanish biotechnology company

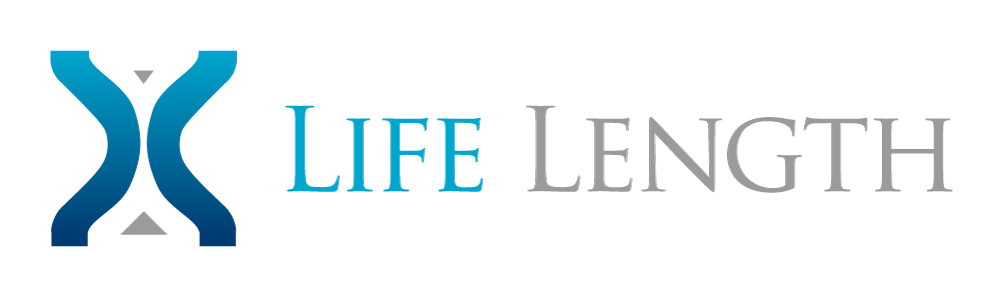
- Industry: Nutraceutical, cell therapy, gene therapy, biotechnology, pharmaceuticalm health administration, oncology
- Founded: 2010
- Founder: Stephen J. Matlin; María Blasco Marhuenda
- Headquarters: Madrid, Spain
- Products: Cosmetics
- Website: lifelength.com

Life Length is a biotechnology company. Founded in 2010 by Stephen J. Matlin and Dr. María Blasco Marhuenda, the company provides telomere diagnostics as well as telomerase measurement. Life Length is Spain's only federally-accredited laboratory under CLIA. It has three main facilities, with offices in Madrid and laboratories located in Tres Cantos.

== History ==
Life Length was established on September 28, 2010 by Stephen J. Matlin and Dr. María Blasco Marhuenda, as a spin-off from the Spanish National Cancer Research Centre. The founders had the objective to commercialize Blasco's HT Q-FISH conceptual work. In 2016, the company obtained CLIA certification, a U.S. government accreditation for clinical laboratories, becoming the only laboratory in Spain with this certification.

In 2017, the ONCOCHECK project, which involves a series of clinical studies focused on cancer diagnostics, received €3.1 million in funding from the European Union's Horizon 2020 research and innovation program.

In 2021, Life Length opened a clinic at Paseo del General Martinez Campos, 46, in Madrid.

In 2022, the company's prostate cancer diagnostic tool received approval from the Spanish Agency for Medicines and Health Products (AEMPS). The same year, the company launched HEALTHTAV, a new product in its portfolio.

== Telomeres and their importance to the company ==
Telomeres are part of our DNA and are found at the ends of chromosomes. Their function is to protect our DNA during each cell division by preventing chromosomes from adhering to each other or from losing important information. They represent the most precise biomarker to measure aging. Telomere deterioration has been associated with the ageing process and many other diseases. Over the years, every time a cell divides, our telomeres successively shorten up to a point where the cells cannot divide any more. Subsequently, they either undergo a process called apoptosis (cells progressively die) or go into senescence (they lose their function). Many studies link long telomeres and a slower rate of telomere shortening with greater longevity. For example, research done on mice showed that individuals with hyper-long telomeres lived 13% longer than those with normal telomeres. However, they also store less fat, which also contributes to greater longevity. Due to the impact, they have at the cellular level, the length of telomeres and their rate of shortening is considered a relevant biomarker for assessing the state of aging of the entire organism.

== Projects ==
Oncocheck

ONCOCHECK is a set of clinical studies conducted by Life Length during 2017. The aim of the project was the clinical validation of telomere-associated variables (TAVs) as cancer biomarkers. It involved more than 1,200 adults and 300 children suffering from one of multiple existing types of cancer, including breast, prostate, lung, and leukemia cancers, among others. ONCOCHECK received funding from the European Union's Horizon 2020 research and innovation program. With more than 7,000 peer-reviewed scientific and clinical publications, telomere length measurement has established itself as a biomarker in cancer diagnosis and prognosis. This project has the invaluable support of some of the most important hospitals in Spain such as "University Hospital 12 de octubre", "University Hospital Puerta de Hierro", "University Hospital Niño Jesús", "Vall d'Hebron Hospital", and "Centro Integral Oncológico Clara Campal (CIOCC)". Within the ONCOCHECK project, Life Length is also conducting studies in advanced solid tumors and chronic lymphocytic leukemia (CLL). The results of the ONCOCHECK project have enabled Life Length to develop new applications in oncology .

Prostate cancer diagnosis product

As a cell becomes cancerous, it divides more frequently, and its telomeres shorten faster. Cancer cells avoid senescence/death and instead become immortal with the ability to replicate indefinitely, even when telomeres are short. Therefore, alterations in telomere length have great potential as a biomarker in cancer.

This diagnosis is an in vitro diagnostic test (IVD) that makes it possible to identify patients with a higher risk of suffering from aggressive prostate cancer. The prostate cancer diagnosis product, combined with the current screening method, aims to prevent hundreds of prostate biopsies annually. It is a test that provides doctors with a useful and rapid tool for clinical decision-making. This test is a minimally invasive procedure that only requires a blood sample from the patient. Life Length launched it on the market in 2022.

== Other studies ==
Life Length is working on developing an algorithm to detect patients at risk for lung cancer. With its telomere measurement platform, the test could potentially fill the gap in lung cancer screening techniques in a routine, minimally invasive, and low-cost way. Life Length was the European Seal of Excellence by the European Commission for its project proposal in lung cancer research.

Life Length has conducted the largest childhood cancer research project to date, obtaining samples from about 100 children with cancer and healthy children. The aim of the study was to help oncology and hematology specialists make better decisions and increase the chances of these children beating cancer. Life Length has carried out these studies with the support of the Hospital Infantil Universitario Niño Jesús in Spain.

== More studies and projects ==
- Brain Age: Environmental influences in prenatal life have a major impact on brain aging and age-associated brain disorders. Aging is considered as a major risk factor of most neurogenerative diseases such as Alzheimer's or Parkinson's disease for example.
- EuroBATS: Studies that uses both genetic and biological approaches. Study of 8,000 identical twins to identify markers of aging. The use of improving the length of the telomeres will be used in this process.
- Frailomic: Utility of biomarkers to characterize elderly individuals at risk for frailty, its progression to disability outcomes, and overall health and well-being consequences. The main objective is to prevent and detect frailty before suffering from it.

== Accreditations ==
Life Length is considered the most accredited clinical laboratory in Spain.

- ISO 15189 – Granted by the International Organization for Standardization develop and publish International Standards.
- Rhode Island Department of Health – A state government agency helping to prevent diseases by protecting and promoting health and safety.

License: The center of Health Facilities and Regulation authorized Life Length to conduct and maintain an Out of State Clinical Laboratory in conformity with RIGL C23-16.2.

- CMS – Centers for Medicare & Medicaid Services. Their objective would be to strengthen health equity, expand coverage, and improve health outcomes.

License: Pursuant to Section 353 of the Public Health Services Act (42 U.S.C. 263a) as revised by the Clinical Laboratory Improvement Amendments (CLIA).

- A2LA – The American Association for Laboratory Accreditation provides comprehensive services in laboratory accreditation and laboratory-related training.
- CDPH – The California Department of Public Health is responsible for the public health of California.
- Maryland Department of Health– The department supports and improves the health and safety through disease prevention, access to care, quality management, and community engagement.

License: Pursuant to the provisions of TITLE 17, subtitle 2, Health-General Article 17-201 et seq., Annotated Code of Maryland

- Pennsylvania Department of Health – The company´s objective is to promote healthy behaviors, prevent injury and disease, and assure the safe delivery of quality health care.

License: Pursuant of the act of September 26, 1951, P.L., 1539 as amended, a Permit to operate a Clinical Laboratory.

- Salud Madrid– The Servicio Madrileño de Salud is responsible for the system of public health services in the Community of Madrid. This public provider accredits the extraction of samples in non-health organizations.

License: C.2.5.6 Centro de diagnóstico con unidades de U.72 Obtención de muestras, U.73 Análisis clínicos y U.74 Bioquímica clínica

== Scientific publications ==
Life Length has published to date the following articles:

In addition, numerous clients of Life Length have published articles based on the results for work performed by the company demonstrating the uniqueness of the TAT® and related technologies:

- Wang, N.; He, Y.; Liu, S.; Makarcyzk, M. J.; Lei, G.; Chang, A.; Alexander, P. G.; Hao, T.; Padget, A. M.; De Pedro, N.; Menelaos, T.; Lin, H. (2022). "Engineering Osteoarthritic Cartilage Model". Science China Life Sciences. 65 (2): 309–327. doi:10.1007/s11427-021-1933-7. PMC 10077511. PMID 34109475. S2CID 235393377.
- Jogi, R.; Tager, M. J.; Perez, D.; Tsapekos, M. (2021). "Bovine Colostrum, Telomeres and Skin aging". Journal of Drugs in Dermatology. 20 (5): 538–545. doi:10.36849/JDD.5851. PMID 33938706.
- Shafa, M.; Walsh, T.; Panchalingam, K. M.; Richardson, T.; Menendez, L.; Tian, X.; Suresh Babu, S.; Dadgar, S.; Beller, J.; Yang, F.; Baghbaderani, B. A. (2019). "Long-term Stability and Differentiation Potential of Cryopreserved CGMP-compliant Human Induced Pluripotent Stem Cells". International Journal of Molecular Sciences. 21 (1): 108. doi:10.3390/ijms21010108. PMC 6982271. PMID 31877913.
- Samuel, P.; Tsapekos, M.; De Pedro, N.; Liu, A. G.; Casey Lippmeier, J.; Chen, S. (2022). "Ergothioneine Mitigates Telomere Shortening under Oxidative Stress Conditions". Journal of Dietary Supplements. 19 (2): 212–225. doi:10.1080/19390211.2020.1854919. PMID 33287595. S2CID 227953602.
- Mehkri, S.; Perez, Diego; Najarro, Pilar; Tsapekos, Menelaos; Bopanna, K. N. (July 2019). "Effect of Lutein (Lute-gen®) on Proliferation Rate and Telomere Length In Vitro and Possible Mechanism of Action". International Journal of Biology Research. 4 (3): 84–91.
- Phillippe, M.; Sawyer, M. R.; Edelson, P. K. (2019). "The Telomere Gestational Clock". American Journal of Obstetrics and Gynecology. 220 (5): 496.e1–496.e8. doi:10.1016/j.ajog.2019.01.218. PMID 30690015. S2CID 59342701.
- Sheng, C.; Jungverdorben, J.; Wiethoff, H.; Lin, Q.; Flitsch, L. J.; Eckert, D.; Hebisch, M.; Fischer, J.; Kesavan, J.; Weykopf, B.; Schneider, L.; Holtkamp, D.; Beck, H.; Till, A.; Wüllner, U.; Ziller, M. J.; Wagner, W.; Peitz, M.; Brüstle, O. (2018). "A Stably Self-Renewing Adult Blood-derived Induced Neural Stem Cell Exhibiting Pattern Ability and Epigenetic Rejuvenation". Nature Communications. 9 (1): 4047. Bibcode:2018NatCo...9.4047S. doi:10.1038/s41467-018-06398-5. PMC 6168501. PMID 30279449.
- López-Alcorocho, J. M.; Guillén-Vicente, I.; Rodríguez-Iñigo, E.; Guillén-Vicente, M.; Fernández-Jaén, T. F.; Caballero, R.; Casqueiro, M.; Najarro, P.; Abelow, S.; Guillén-García, P. (2019). "Study of Telomere Length in Preimplanted Cultured Chondrocytes". Cartilage. 10 (1): 36–42. doi:10.1177/1947603517749918. PMC 6376562. PMID 29322876.
- Salvador, L.; Singaravelu, G.; Harley, C. B.; Flom, P.; Suram, A.; Raffaele, J. M. (2016). "A Natural Product Telomerase Activator Lengthens Telomeres in Humans". Rejuvenation Research. 19 (6): 478–484. doi:10.1089/rej.2015.1793. PMC 5178008. PMID 26950204.
- Alda, M.; Puebla-Guedea, M.; Rodero, B.; Demarzo, M.; Montero-Marin, J.; Roca, M.; Garcia-Campayo, J. (2016). "Zen meditation, Length of Telomeres, and the Role of Experiential Avoidance and Compassion". Mindfulness. 7 (3): 651–659. doi:10.1007/s12671-016-0500-5. PMC 4859856. PMID 27217844.
- De Rooij, S. R.; Van Pelt, A. M.; Ozanne, S. E.; Korver, C. M.; Van Daalen, S. K.; Painter, R. C.; Schwab, M.; Viegas, M. H.; Roseboom, T. J. (2015). "Prenatal Undernutrition and Leukocyte Telomere Length in Late Adulthood". The American Journal of Clinical Nutrition. 102 (3): 655–660. doi:10.3945/ajcn.115.112326. PMID 26178721. S2CID 4493294.
- Chen, R.; et al. (2012). "Personal Omics Profiling Reveals Dynamic Molecular and Medical Phenotypes". Cell. 148 (6): 1293–1507. doi:10.1016/j.cell.2012.02.009. PMC 3341616. PMID 22424236.
- Bernardes De Jesus, B.; Schneeberger, K.; Vera, E.; Tejera, A.; Harley, C. B.; Blasco, M. A. (2011). "The Telomerase Activator TA-65". Aging Cell. 10 (4): 604–621. doi:10.1111/j.1474-9726.2011.00700.x. PMC 3627294. PMID 21426483.
