= Christopher Heeschen =

German physician

Christopher Heeschen (born 1966) is a German MD with a PhD. In 2004, he became a professor of Experimental Medicine and Department Head of Medicine at LMU Munich. He subsequently held leadership positions at the Spanish National Cancer Research Centre (CNIO) from 2009 to 2014. and Barts Cancer Institute in London from 2013 to 2018. Since 2018 he is co-director of the Center for Single-Cell Omics at Shanghai Jiao Tong University School of Medicine. In 2021, he also became Principal Investigator at the Candiolo Cancer Institute FPO IRCCS in Italy.

Heeschen was recognized by the Paul-Martini-Award in 2002 for describing a rebound phenomenon in patients with unstable coronary heart disease after the withdrawal of statins. In 2009, he received the Richtzenhain Award from the German Cancer Research Center.

His most cited article, on cancer stem cells, has been cited 3521 times, according to Google Scholar.
