= José A. Carrillo =

Spanish mathematician

José Antonio Carrillo de la Plata
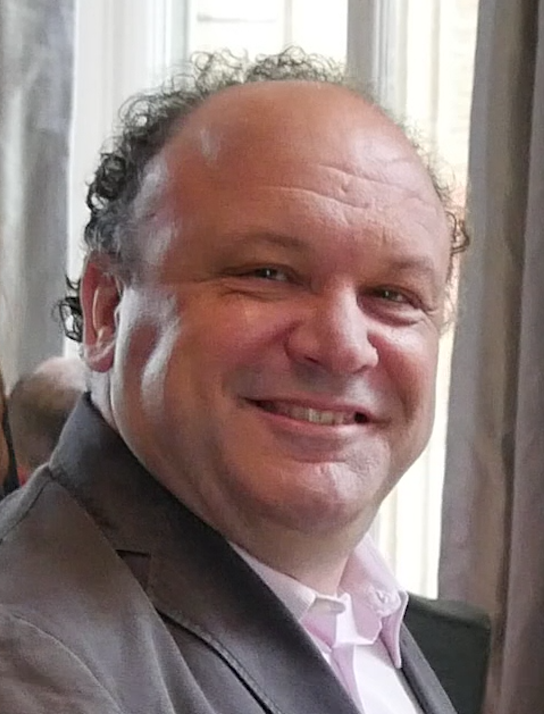
- Born: 29 December 1969 (53 years old); Granada, Spain

Academic background
- Education: Universidad de Granada
- Thesis: Estudio de soluciones débiles del sistema de Vlasov-Poisson-Fokker-Planck (1996)
- Doctoral advisor: Juan Soler

Academic work
- Discipline: Partial differential equations, Kinetic theory, Numerical Analysis
- Website: www.maths.ox.ac.uk/people/jose.carrillodelaplata

José Antonio Carrillo de la Plata (pronounced [xoˈse an'tonjo ka'riʎo ðe la 'plata]; born 29 December 1969) is a Spanish mathematician primarily known for his contributions in applied partial differential equations, numerical analysis, many particle systems and kinetic theory. His works make use of methods from functional analysis, calculus of variations, optimal transport, gradient descent and entropy methods. Currently he is Professor of Nonlinear Partial Differential Equations at the Mathematical Institute of the University of Oxford where he started in April 2020. He is also Tutorial Fellow at The Queen's College Oxford in Applied Mathematics. He was previously chair in Applied and Numerical Analysis at the Department of Mathematics, Imperial College London, United Kingdom, a position he held from October 2012 till March 2020. He served as Chair of the Applied Mathematics Committee of the European Mathematical Society during the period 2014–2017. He was formerly ICREA Research Professor at the Universitat Autònoma de Barcelona, Spain, during the period 2003–2012, and held positions at the University of Granada, Spain, and the University of Texas at Austin, United States during the years 1992–2003. He was recognized with the SeMA prize (2003) and the GAMM Richard Von-Mises prize (2006) for young researchers. He was a holder of the Royal Society Wolfson Fellowship during the period 2012–2017.

He was recognized as a Highly Cited Researcher in the years 2015, 2016, 2017, 2018, 2019 and 2020. In 2018, he was elected to the European Academy of Sciences, and nominated Changjiang Visiting Scholar (2018–2021) by the Ministry of Education of the People's Republic of China. In 2019, he was nominated as fellow of the Society for Industrial and Applied Mathematics for his outstanding contributions to applied mathematics in complex particle dynamics and his service to the Applied Mathematics Community of the European Mathematical Society. He has been elected as Member of the European Academy of Sciences in 2018, foreign member of the Spanish Royal Academy of Sciences in 2021 and Member of the Academia Europaea in 2023. He received the 2022 Echegaray Medal awarded by the Spanish Royal Academy of Sciences in recognition of an exceptional scientific career. He received the 2024 International Tarturari Prize in Mathematics, Mechanics and their applications by the Accademia dei Lincei. He has been chosen fellow of the AMS class 2026 and member of the first cohort of fellows in 2026 of the newly created UK Academy for the Mathematical Sciences..

== Research and career ==
José A. Carrillo was born in 1969 in Granada, Spain, where he completed a Bachelor in Mathematics (1992) and a Bachelor in Computer Science (1992) at University of Granada. He obtained his Ph.D. degree in mathematics at the University of Granada under the supervision of Prof. Juan Soler for his dissertation entitled “Estudio de soluciones débiles del sistema de Vlasov-Poisson-Fokker-Planck” ("Study of weak solutions to the Vlasov-Poisson-Fokker-Planck system").

=== Mathematical work ===
He has authored more than 300 mathematical research papers centered around partial differential equations. He has made contributions to the understanding of the asymptotic and qualitative behavior of solutions to nonlinear diffusion equations, particularly through the use of entropy methods and gradient flow techniques. He obtained results on the exponential convergence to equilibrium of the porous medium equation by using an analogue of the Bakry-Émery method . He has also worked on kinetic and diffusive models in mathematical biology describing chemotaxis, flocking and swarming behavior of interacting agents, as well as on computational neuroscience. In particular, he made contributions to the complete classification of the asymptotic behavior of solutions to the Patlak-Keller-Segel model for the aggregation of cells in biological systems.

=== Awards and honors ===
- SeMA (es:Sociedad Española de Matemática Aplicada) Young Researcher Prize, 2003.
- Richard von Mises Prize of the International Association of Applied Mathematics and Mechanics (GAMM), 2006.
- Royal Society Wolfson Research Merit Award, 2012.
- Student Academic Choice Award (SACA) for Best Supervision, Imperial College London, 2016.
- Highly Cited Researcher in the years 2015, 2016, 2017, 2018, 2019 and 2020.
- Member of the European Academy of Sciences, 2018.
- Fellow of the Society for Industrial and Applied Mathematics, 2019.
- Foreign Member of the Spanish Royal Academy of Sciences, 2021.
- Echegaray Medal, awarded by the Spanish Royal Academy of Sciences., 2022.
- Member of the Academia Europaea 2023.
- International Tarturari Prize in Mathematics, Mechanics and their applications by the Accademia dei Lincei 2024.
- Fellow of the American Mathematical Society 2026.
- Fellow of the UK Academy for the Mathematical sciences 2026.

=== Science policy ===
He is member of the Scientific and Technical Committee of the Spanish Science Agency 2021–2025. He participated in the Committee of Science Policy and is member of the Scientific Advisory Board of the Sociedad de Científicos Españoles en el Reino Unido (Spanish Society of Researchers in the UK) SRUK/CERU. He contributed towards the Science Policy Report of SRUK/CERU due to the Spanish General Elections of 2015.
