= José Augusto Sánchez Pérez =

José Augusto Sánchez Pérez (Madrid, 30 November 1882 – 13 November 1958) was a Spanish mathematician and member of the Spanish Royal Academy of Sciences.

He was professor of mathematics at the Instituto Beatriz de Galindo in Madrid. He published in the history of mathematics, in particular on Islamic mathematics in al-Andalus.
