= Enrique Meléndez-Hevia =

Spanish scientist (born 1946)

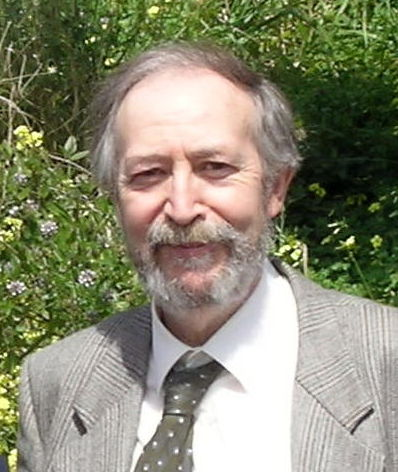
- Enrique Meléndez-Hevia in Tenerife, 2007
- Born: 1 February 1946; Huétor Vega, Province of Granada, Spain
- Education: Colegio Santa María del Pilar, Madrid; Universidad Complutense de Madrid, doctorate of sciences, 1973
- Spouse: María Rosa Morales Pérez
- Children: 2
- Parents: Bermudo Meléndez Meléndez (father); Isabel Hevia Cangas (mother)
- Scientific career
- Fields: Biochemistry, evolution
- Institutions: Universidad Complutense de Madrid; Universidad de La Laguna, Tenerife; Instituto del Metabolismo Celular, Tenerife
- Thesis: Isoenzimas de láctico deshidrogenasa. Regulación metabólica (1973)
- Academic advisors: Ángel Martín Municio

Enrique Meléndez-Hevia (born 1946) is a Spanish biochemist, known for studies of evolutionary biochemistry and human metabolism.

== Personal life ==
Enrique Meléndez-Hevia was born on 1 February 1946 in Huétor Vega, Province of Granada, Spain, son of Bermudo Meléndez Meléndez, Professor of Palaeontology at the Universidad Complutense de Madrid, and Isabel Hevia Cangas. He married María Rosa Morales Pérez.

== Education ==
After obtaining his baccalaureate at the Colegio Santa María del Pilar in Madrid, Enrique Meléndez-Hevia obtained his doctorate of sciences at the Universidad Complutense de Madrid in 1973 on the basis of a thesis entitled Isoenzimas de láctico deshidrogenasa. Regulación metabólica (Isoenzymes of lactate dehydrogenase. Metabolic regulation), directed by Ángel Martín Municio.

== Career ==
After having had positions at the Universidad Complutense de Madrid, Meléndez-Hevia moved to the University of La Laguna in Tenerife (Canary Islands), where he was Head of the Biochemistry Department. Later he created the Institute of Cellular Metabolism in El Sauzal, Tenerife, as an enterprise responsible for managing his nutritional and other products.

== Research ==
Meléndez-Hevia first attracted widespread attention from biochemists with his “game of the pentose phosphate cycle”. In this he set out to show that although the non-oxidative pentose phosphate cycle may seem at first sight to be a hopelessly arbitrary and unmemorable collection of chemical reactions it is in a sense the simplest way of interconverting six pentose molecules and five hexose molecules. The “game” involves searching for the smallest number of transaldolase and transketolase steps that can achieve the conversion. This and other pathways, such as the Calvin cycle, led to a general theory of the optimization of metabolism.

A more complex example concerned the Krebs tricarboxylate cycle. He and colleagues analysed the cycle as a problem of chemical design to oxidize acetate yielding reduction equivalents to the respiratory chain to make ATP. They showed that although there are several different chemical solutions to this problem, the design of the pathway in living cells is the best chemical solution, with the least possible number of steps, and it also has the greatest yield of ATP. They considered this in the context of the general nature of the evolution of metabolism.

Building on a theory developed by Easterby, he collaborated with Henrik Kacser in a study of how metabolic control analysis should deal with transition times, i.e. the times required to switch from one metabolic state to another. This was followed by a general theory of transition times in metabolic pathways.

A very different example of optimization arises with the structure of glycogen. The molecule includes both branched B chains of glucose units, and unbranched A chains (and a single C chain attached to the glycogenin molecule in the centre), and the question of optimization concerns how many branches each B chain should have, and how many layers the whole molecule should have. Meléndez and colleagues found that in nearly all organisms (with the exception of oysters) the structure is indeed optimal, with exactly two branches in each B chain, and about 12 layers.

These and other examples led Meléndez-Hevia to a general interest in how living organisms arose from prebiotic chemistry. and in the optimization of the kinetic parameters of enzymes. He summarized his view of the evolution of metabolism in his book La evolución del metabolismo: hacia la simplicidad, with a general characteristic that metabolism evolves towards an optimal and simplest solution to each problem. A translation of the book into English was made by Athel Cornish-Bowden but was not published. Instead, his own book on biochemical evolution presents many of Meléndez-Hevia's ideas.

In the last part of his career he studied the importance of diet for maintenance of human health, especially the role of glycine. Glycine is essential in all animals for the production of collagen, and although it can be synthesized from serine in a reaction catalysed by glycine hydroxymethyltransferase, the enzyme is regulated according to the need for C_{1} units. For small animals and large but growing animals that is perfectly adequate, but in large animals like adult humans it does not provide enough glycine to meet the need for collagen production. Hence adult humans, in common with elephants and hippopotamuses, often suffer from osteoarthritis. The reaction catalysed by glycine hydroxymethyltransferase is not the only source of glycine in animals, and synthesis of collagen is not the only demand for glycine, so it is necessary to consider whether all the sources together produce enough to satisfy all the needs. Analysis of all known sources (including diet) and demands for glycine in humans showed that there is indeed a shortfall, of the order of 10 g per day.

== Honours and distinctions ==
Member of the Canary Academy of Sciences (Academia Canaria de Ciencias), 1998. Honorary Member of the Spanish Society of Biological and Anti-aging Medicine, 2006.
