= María Soengas =

Spanish immunologist and academic

María S. (Marisol) Soengas
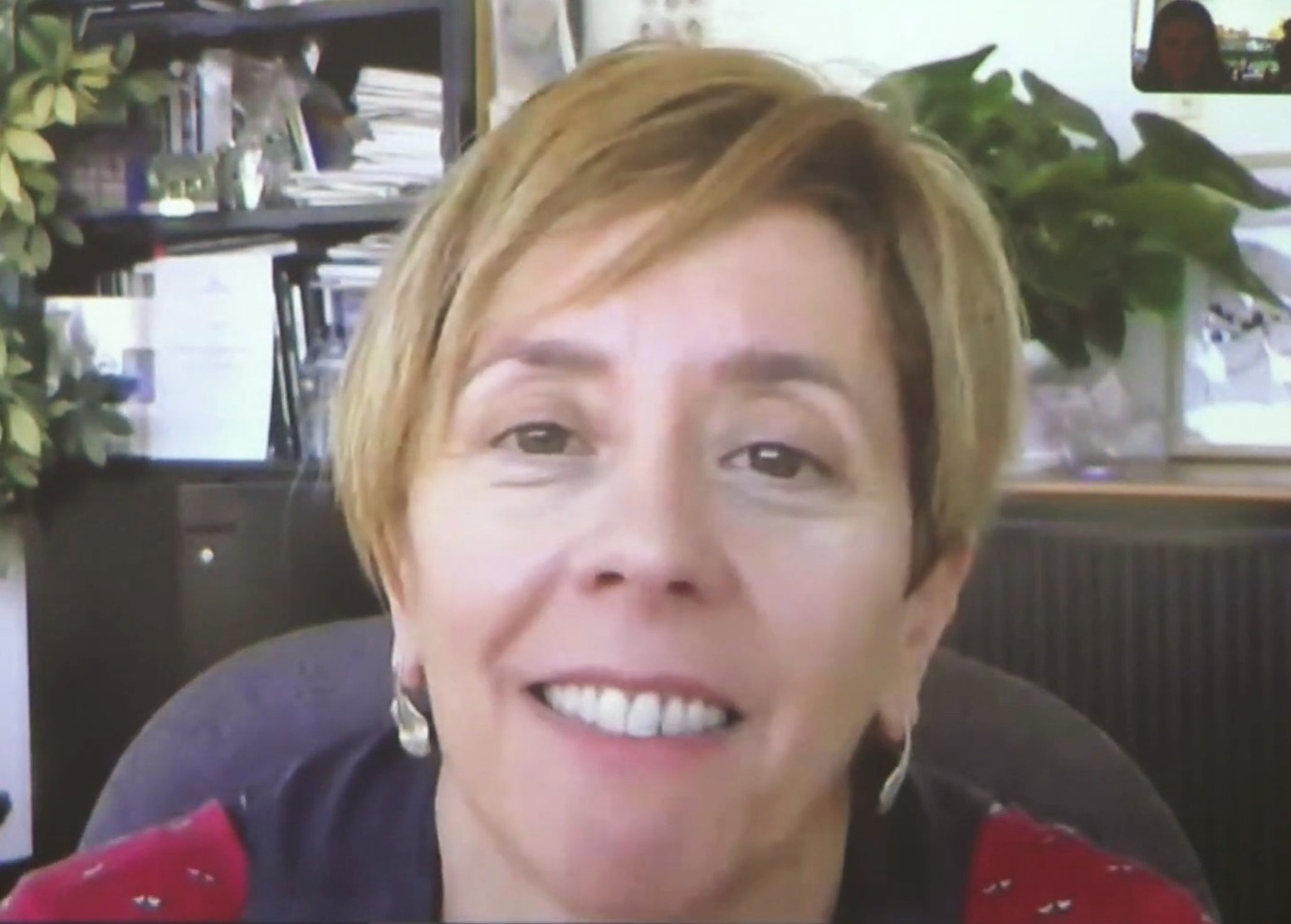
- Soengas interviewed in 2019
- Born: 1968 (age 57–58); Agolada
- Education: Autonomous University of Madrid; University of A Coruña
- Scientific career
- Workplaces: University of Michigan; Cold Spring Harbor Laboratory; Spanish National Cancer Research Centre

María S. (Marisol) Soengas (born 1968) is a Spanish immunologist who is a senior scientist at the Spanish National Cancer Research Center (CNIO). Her research considers melanoma and the development of new therapeutic strategies. She was elected to the European Molecular Biology Organization in 2022.

== Early life and education ==
Soengas was born in Agolada. She was an undergraduate student at the University of A Coruña, and moved to the Autonomous University of Madrid for doctoral research. She worked in molecular biology with M. Salas in the Centro de Biología Molecular Severo Ochoa. She worked as a postdoctoral scholar at the Cold Spring Harbor Laboratory and at the University of Michigan. At the Cold Spring Harbor Laboratory, she characterised the apoptotic factors as melanoma suppressors. After deciding to expand beyond cellular/animal models, Soengas moved to the dermatology department in Michigan, home to the Multidisciplinary Melanoma Clinics.

== Research and career ==
In 2008, Soengas joined the Spanish National Cancer Research Center (CNIO), where she established a research program that looked to understand melanoma, and to translate cutting-edge scientific research into clinical practice. Soengas looks to identify new biomarkers of disease, and the mechanisms of cellular stress that are deregulated in melanoma. Her group was the first to describe a lymphoreporter (MetAlert) mice for non-invasive imaging of pre-metastatic niches in melanoma. This allowed her to understand the mechanisms of immune resistance as well as to generate nanoparticle-based treatments.

== Awards and honors ==
- Dana Ashby Young Investigator Award of the Society for Melanoma Research
- 2009 Premio M. Josefa Wonenburger from the Xunta de Galicia
- 2013 Melanoma Research Alliance Award
- 2016 L’Oreal-MRA Women-Lead Team Award
- 2022 Elected to the European Molecular Biology Organization
- 2022 Pezcoller-Marina Larcher Fogazzaro-EACR Women in Cancer Research Award

== Selected publications ==
- Soengas MS; Capodieci P; Polsky D; et al. (1 January 2001). "Inactivation of the apoptosis effector Apaf-1 in malignant melanoma". Nature. 409 (6817): 207–211. doi:10.1038/35051606. ISSN 1476-4687. PMID 11196646. Wikidata Q31984891.
- Chrysiis Michaloglou; Liesbeth C W Vredeveld; Marisol Soengas; et al. (1 August 2005). "BRAFE600-associated senescence-like cell cycle arrest of human naevi". Nature. 436 (7051): 720–724. doi:10.1038/nature03890. ISSN 1476-4687. PMID 16079850. Wikidata Q29619550.
- María S Soengas; Scott W Lowe (1 May 2003). "Apoptosis and melanoma chemoresistance". Oncogene. 22 (20): 3138–3151. doi:10.1038/sj.onc.1206454. ISSN 0950-9232. PMID 12789290. Wikidata Q35146577.
- Marisol Soengas; Alarcón RM; Yoshida H; Giaccia AJ; Hakem R; Mak TW; Lowe SW (1 April 1999). "Apaf-1 and caspase-9 in p53-dependent apoptosis and tumor inhibition". Science. 284 (5411): 156–159. doi:10.1126/science.284.5411.156. ISSN 0036-8075. PMID 10102818. Wikidata Q53425055.
