= José Elguero Bertolini =

Spanish chemist (born 1934)

José Elguero Bertolini (born 1934) is a Spanish chemist best known for his contributions to heterocyclic chemistry. He is Honorary Research Professor at the Medicinal Chemistry Institute of the Spanish National Research Council (CSIC), an institution he chaired from 1983 to 1984. Since 2015, he is the president of the Spanish Royal Academy of Sciences.

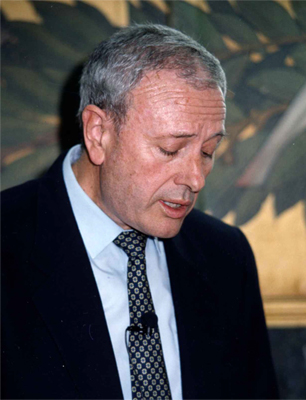
José Elguero Bertolini

== Life ==
José Elguero was born on Christmas Day, 1934, in Madrid, Spain, where he graduated in chemistry from the Central University, now University Complutense of Madrid (B.Sc., 1957). In spite of the possibility to continue his studies with either Professor Francisco Fariña or Professor Jesús Morcillo in Madrid he moved to France. After a fruitless attempt to become a perfumist, Professor Robert Jacquier at the University of Montpellier accepted him as a PhD student (PhD, 1961). He also received a Doctorate of Science by the University Complutense of Madrid (1977). He was appointed “Attaché de Recherche” and promoted to “Maître de Recherche” at the Centre National de la Recherche Scientifique (CNRS) first in Montpellier and later at the laboratory of Professor Jacques Metzger in Marseille where he worked until 1979. He was visitor at Prof. Alan R. Katritzky laboratory in England. After more than 20 years of research in France he returned in 1980 to Spain to hold a Research Professor position at the Spanish Council for Scientific Research (CSIC) in Madrid where he has continued his career. He was appointed Honorary Research Professor in 2005. He has served as President of CSIC (1983–1984), President of the Social Council of the Autonomous University of Madrid (1986–1990), President of the Scientific Advisory Board of Comunidad de Madrid (1990–1995) and President of the Forum Foro Permanente Química y Sociedad (2008–2010). He is probably the most prolific Spanish scientist with more than 1500 scientific publications. His humanist view of science and the world is also well documented throughout many articles and interviews.

Elguero's contributions to chemistry have been numerous thanks to a multitude of interdisciplinary collaborations. For instance, in the field of heterocyclic chemistry he has studied tautomerism, hydrogen bonding and aromaticity in systems including numerous azoles and phosphaphenalenes. In physical chemistry he has investigated the spectroscopic behaviour of heterocycles and organometallic systems by NMR and the application of computational chemistry to the study of the structures and reactivity of heterocycles. He has also been involved in crystallographic studies for crystal engineering. In synthetic chemistry he has contributed to areas such as phase-transfer catalysis, photochemistry, flash pyrolysis and process optimization. Solid-state and gas-phase chemistry in relation to sonochemistry and microwave chemistry has also been of interest to him. In medicinal chemistry he has made extensive use of mathematical Quantitative Structure-Activity Relationships (QSAR) methods for the design of a variety of biologically active compounds for different therapeutic applications.

== Books ==
He is the co-author of a fundamental book in heterocyclic chemistry:

- The Tautomerism of Heterocycles. Advances in Heterocyclic Chemistry-Supplement 1, 1976.
