= Huétor Vega =

City in Granada, Spain

- city
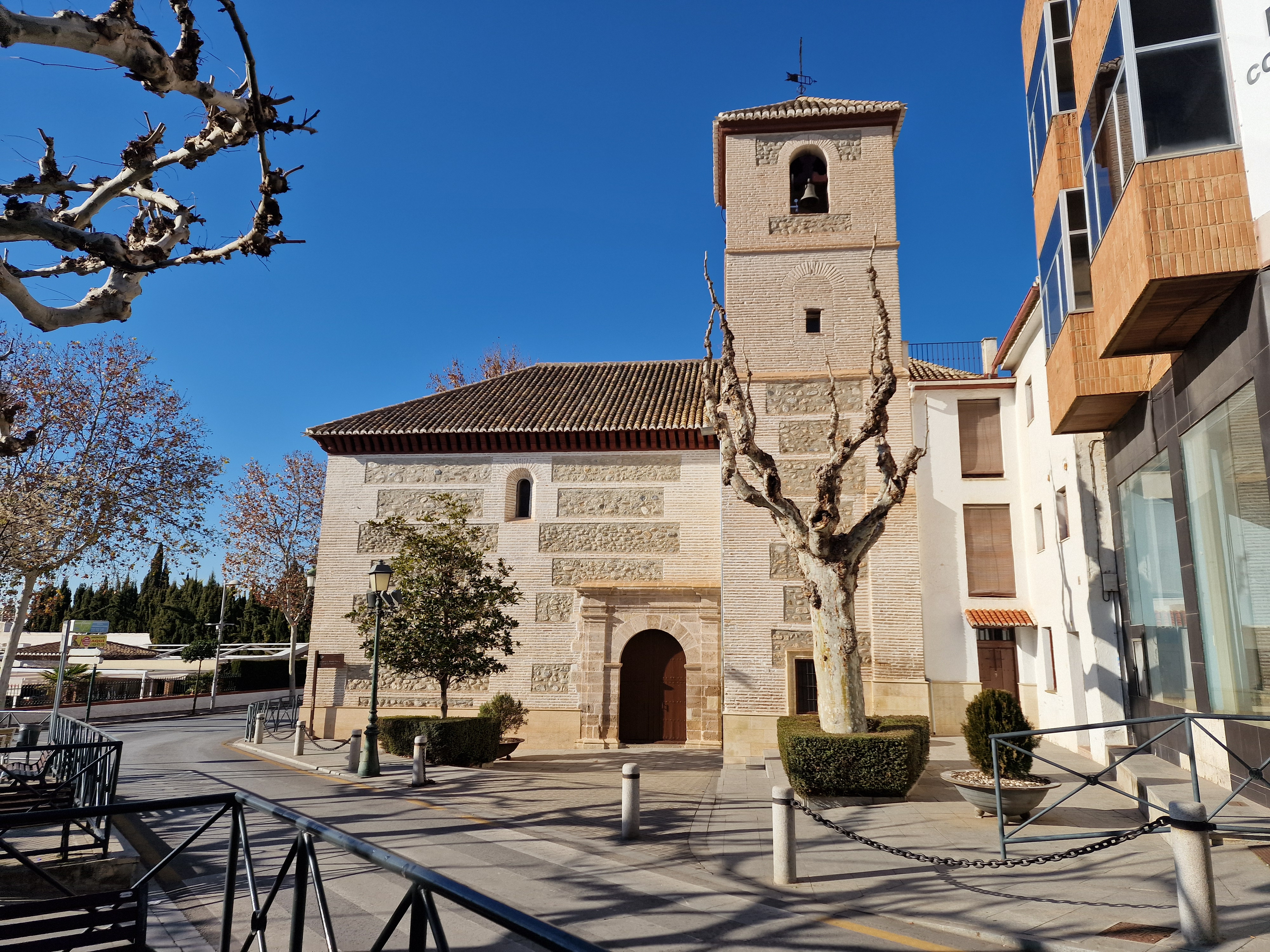

- Flag Coat of arms

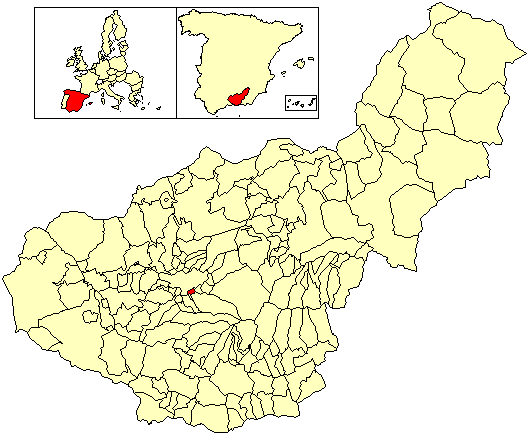
- Location of Huétor Vega
- Coordinates: 37°09′N 3°34′W
- Country: Spain
- Province: Granada
- Municipality: Huétor Vega

Area
  - Total: 4.24 km^{2} (1.64 sq mi)
- Elevation: 724 m (2,375 ft)

Population (2025-01-01)
  - Total: 12,285
  - Density: 2,900/km^{2} (7,500/sq mi)
- Time zone: UTC+1 (CET)
  - Summer (DST): UTC+2 (CEST)

Huétor Vega is a municipality in the province of Granada, Spain. According to the 2006 census (INE), the city had a population of 10,743 inhabitants.

== Notable people ==
- Enrique Meléndez-Hevia (1946–), biochemist, was born in Huétor Vega.

== See also ==
- List of municipalities in Granada
