= Luis Oro =

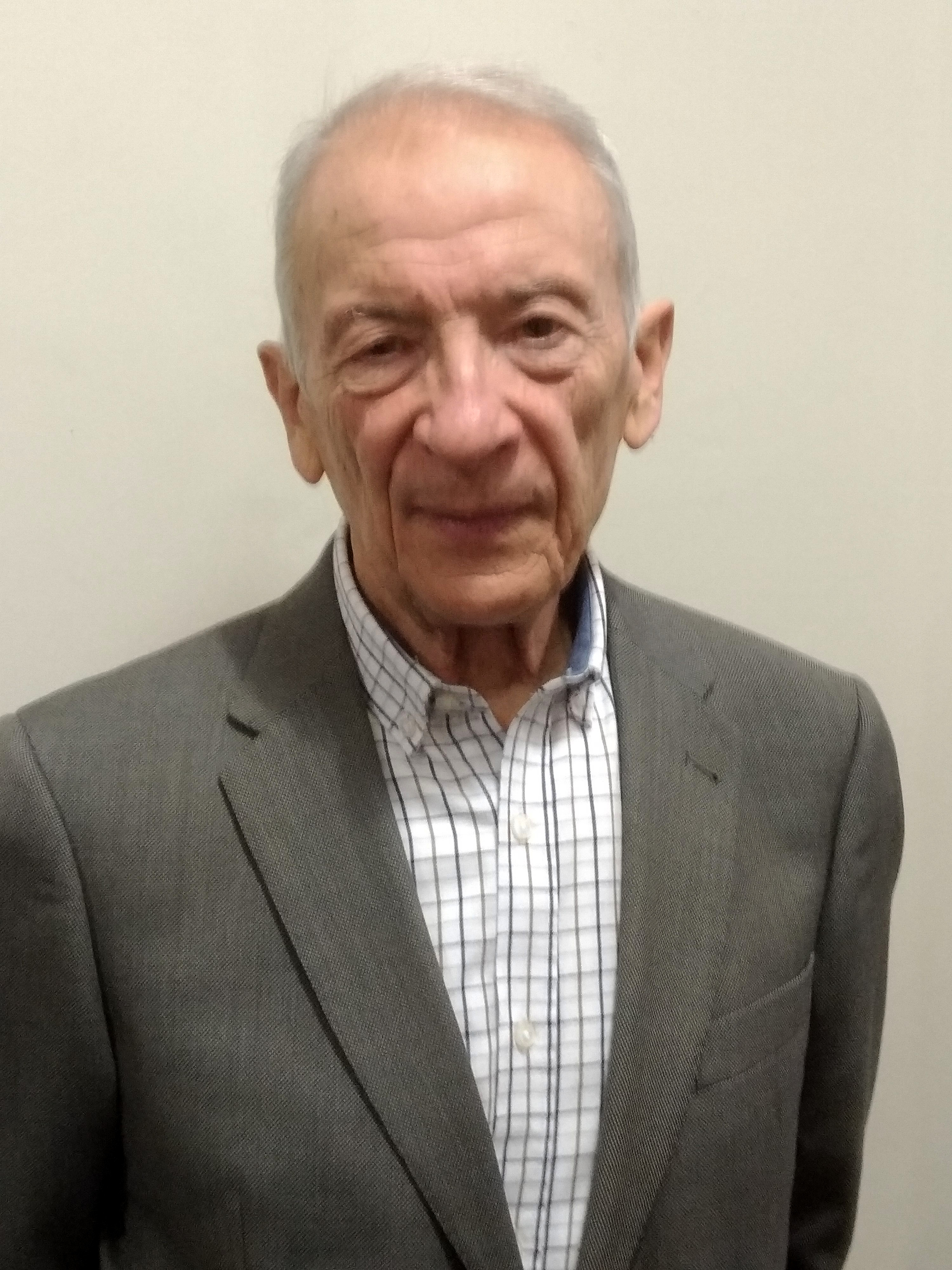
Luis Oro Giral

Luis Antonio Oro Giral (born 13 June 1945 in Zaragoza) He studied Chemistry at the University of Zaragoza, where he earned his PhD in 1970, and has been professor of chemistry at the University of Zaragoza since 1982. His main research interests are in organometallic chemistry and homogeneous catalysis with a special interest in reaction mechanisms. He has coauthored well over 500 scientific papers being co-author or co-editor of several books. He has received numerous national and international awards and honors, and is member of several international scientific academies. He has been President of the European Association for Chemical and Molecular Sciences (2008–2011) and President of the Spanish Royal Society of Chemistry (2000–2005). He has also served in high-level positions in the Spanish public administration with responsibilities for science, as Director General for Scientific and Technical Research and Secretary General of the Spanish Government’s National Plan for Scientific Research and Development (1987–1994).

In 2019, he received the Lord Lewis Prize, awarded by the Royal Society of Chemistry. He was the first non-British recipient to receive this distinction.
