= Ángel Martín Municio =

Spanish scientist (1923–2002)

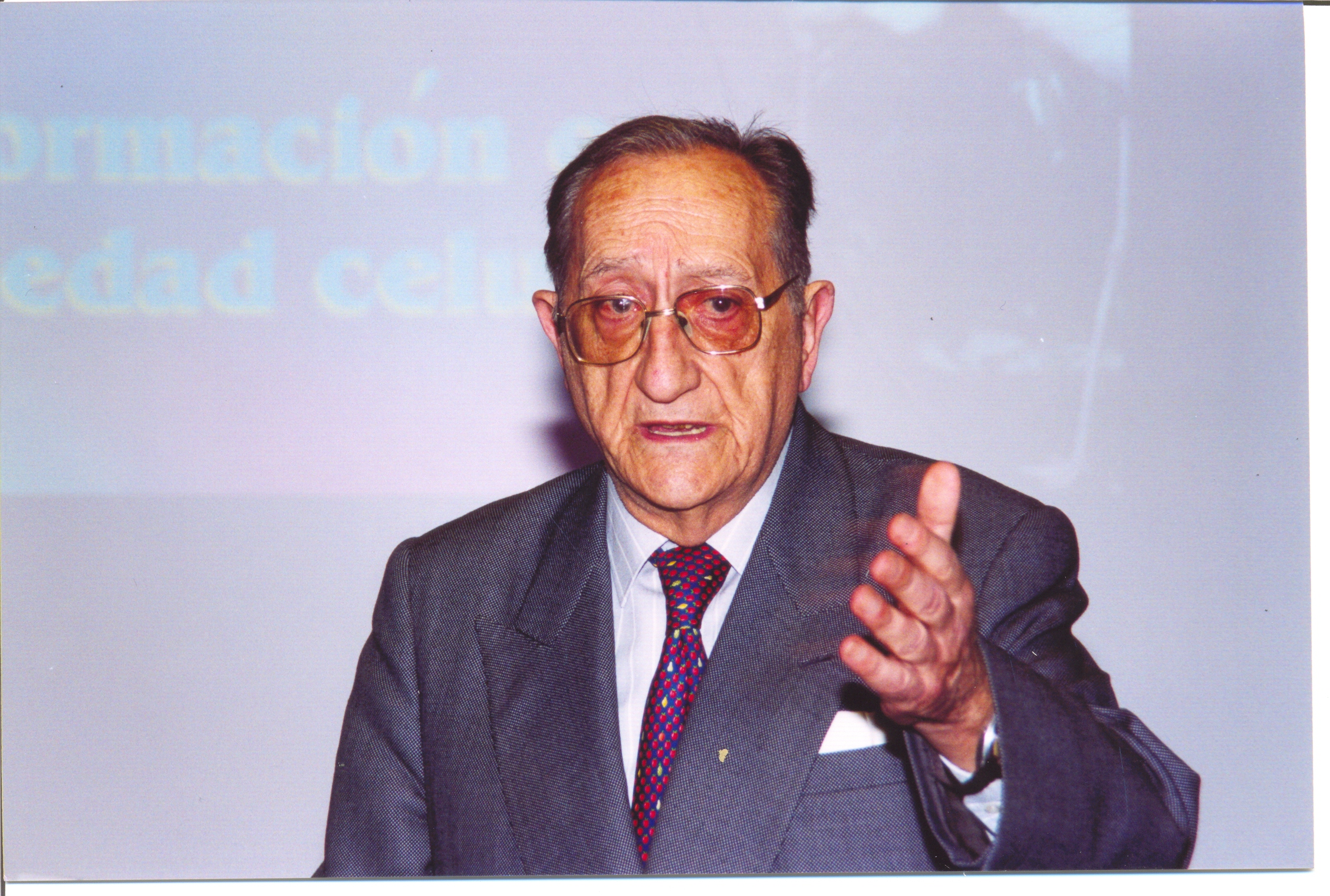
- Born: 30 November 1923; Logroño, Spain
- Died: 23 November 2002 (aged 78); Madrid, Spain

Seat o of the Real Academia Española
- In office 29 January 1984 – 23 November 2002
- Preceded by: Seat established
- Succeeded by: Antonio Fernández Alba

Ángel Martín Municio (Haro, La Rioja, 30 November 1923 – Madrid, 23 November 2002) was a Spanish scientist, researcher, and professor known for his contributions to physics and chemistry.

== Biography ==
Municio earned degrees in chemistry and pharmacology from the University of Salamanca and the University of Santiago de Compostela, respectively. He subsequently obtained doctorates from the University of Madrid (now the Complutense University of Madrid).

He was an assistant professor of organic chemistry at the Faculty of Sciences of the University of Madrid (1948–1951) and was later a collaborator and researcher at the CSIC and head of the biochemistry department of the Institute of Chemistry (1951–1967). He studied at various universities and institutions outside of Spain, such as the Rijks Universiteit in Utrecht (1951–1954) and the Medical Research Council in Cambridge (1969).

As a professor of biochemistry and molecular biology at the Complutense University of Madrid (1967–1989), he was the first Spanish individual to become a member of the European Molecular Biology Organization in 1969. He represented Spain at the European Conference on Molecular Biology between 1962 and 1990, and served as the vice-president from 1982 to 1990.

He also served as vice-president of the European Language Resources Association, and as President of the Spanish Royal Academy of Sciences. He was the vice-director of the Spanish Royal Academy from 1992 to 1999, where he held the "o" seat as a member.

He held other memberships and affiliations throughout his career, including: European Academies of Arts, Sciences and Humanities (1992); Scientiarum et Artium Europaea (1997); Academies of Physical, Mathematical and Natural Sciences of Venezuela (1993); Sciences of Colombia (1994); Sciences of Russia (1996); honorary member of the Academies of Sciences of the Dominican Republic (1994); Spanish Language of Colombia (1997); and honorary member of the Interamerican Medical and Health Association (1993).

He supervised several doctoral theses and was the author of numerous scientific publications and books.

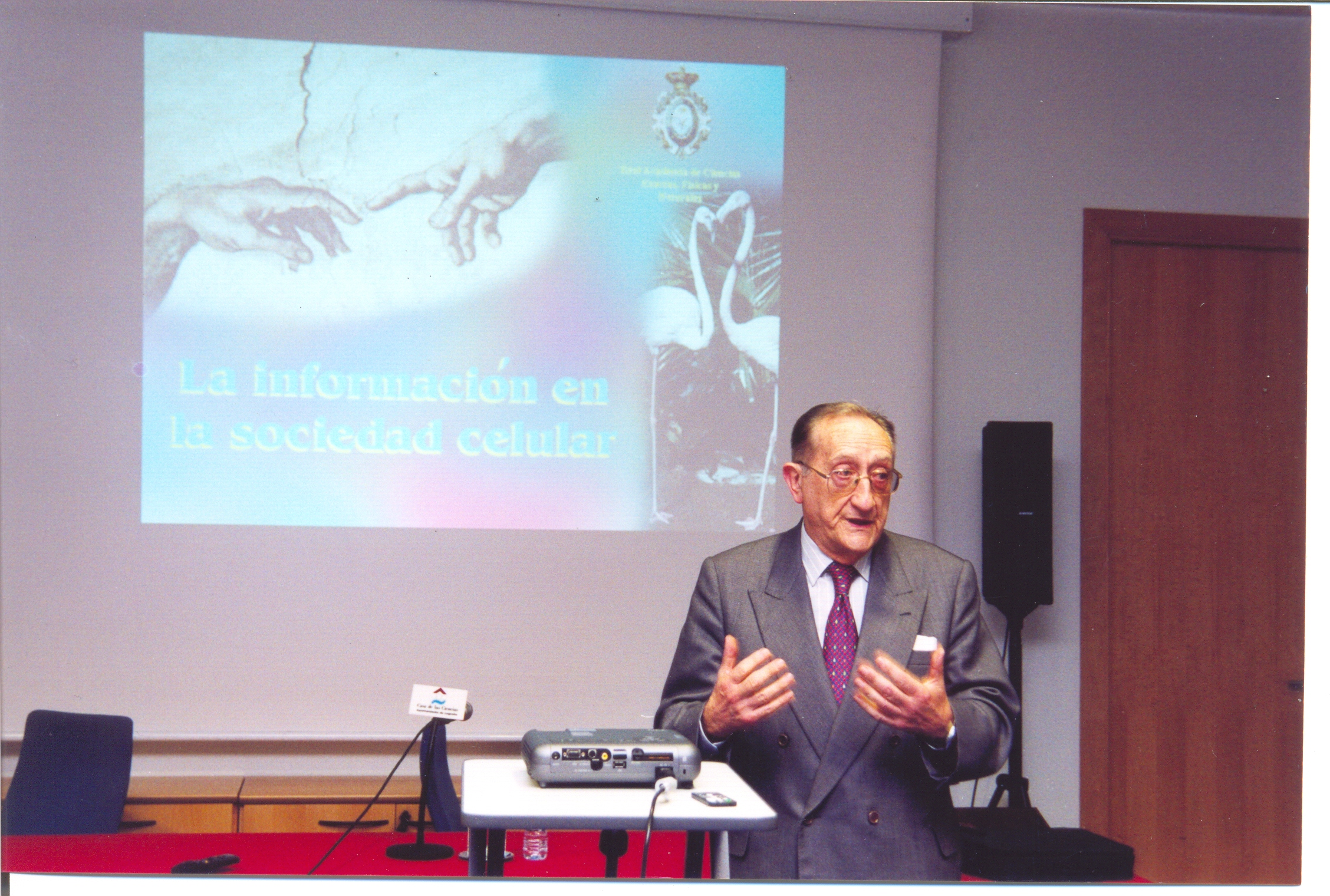
D. Ángel Martín Municio

== Honors and awards ==
He received various recognitions and awards, including: Medal of Merit for Research by the Royal Spanish Society of Physics and Chemistry; the Cross of Alfonso X the Wise; the Grand Cross of Military Merit; the Gold Medal of La Rioja; the Medal of Honor for the Promotion of Invention; the Medal of the Complutense University; and the Medal of Merit of the Government of Colombia.

== Legacy ==
On February 18, 2010, a public square was dedicated close to his birthplace in Logroño.

== Works in Spanish ==
- Martín Municio, Ángel (1974). Interacciones moleculares. Proyección biológica (in Spanish). Fundación Juan March. ISBN 978-84-400-7177-4.
- — (2003). La investigación en la gran industria: el contexto europeo (in Spanish). Delegacion Española de la Academia Europea de Ciencias. ISBN 978-84-607-9584-1.
- — (1999). Naturaleza, ciencia y cultura (in Spanish). Fundación Antonio de Nebrija. ISBN 978-84-88957-27-6.
- — (1991). Torres Quevedo y su época (in Spanish). Amigos de la Cultura Científica. ISBN 978-84-87635-04-5.
- — (2003). El valor económico de la lengua española (in Spanish). Espasa-Calpe. ISBN 978-84-670-1035-0.
- Martín Municio, Ángel; Colino Martínez, Antonio (2004). Diccionario español de la energía (in Spanish). Ediciones Doce Calles. ISBN 978-84-9744-025-7.
- Martín Municio, Ángel; García Barreno, Pedro (1996). Polimorfismo génico (HLA) en poblaciones hispanoamericanas (in Spanish). Real Academia de Ciencias Exactas, Físicas y Naturales. ISBN 978-84-87125-33-1.
- Cowgill, Robert W.; Pardee, Arthur B.; Martín Municio, Ángel (tr.) (1964). Técnicas de investigación bioquímica (in Spanish). Pearson Alhambra. ISBN 978-84-205-0028-7.
- Martín Municio, Ángel. Real Academia de Ciencias Exactas, Físicas y Naturales (ed.). Discurso Inaugural del año académico 1980–1981 (in Spanish). Depósito Legal: M. 36.660-1980.
