= José García Santesmases =

Spanish physicist and computer scientist (1907–1989)

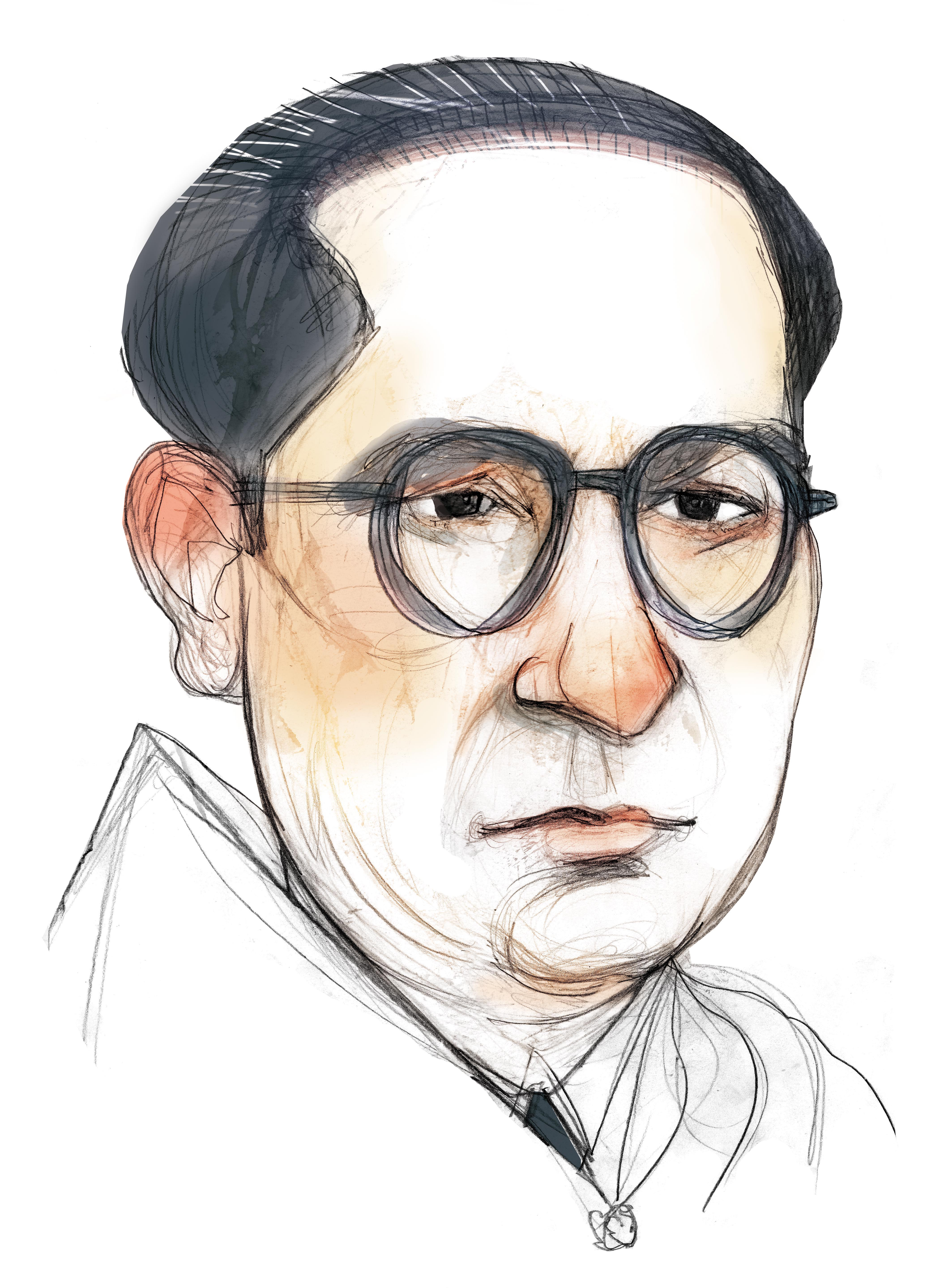
- Born: 2 May 1907; Barcelona
- Died: 24 October 1989
- Known for: Computer Science

José García Santesmases (May 2, 1907 – October 24, 1989) was a physicist and pioneer of computer science in Spain. He built the first analog computer and the first microprocessor made in Spain.

== Biography ==
José García Santesmases was born on May 2, 1907, in Barcelona. In 1930 he obtained the title of engineer for the École supérieure d'électricité in Paris. He continued his training and in 1935 he obtained the Extraordinary Prize of the University of Barcelona, graduating as a physicist. He obtained his doctorate at the University of Madrid in 1943 and later moved to the University of Granada, where he taught for two years, after which he returned to Madrid as a professor. In 1949 he worked at the Cavendish Laboratory in Cambridge and then, for a little more than a year, at the computation laboratory of Harvard University, under the direction of Howard H. Aiken.

Santesmases held the Chair of Industrial Physics at the University of Madrid until his retirement in 1977. On October 24, 1989, he died in this city, where he developed most of his scientific career. A street of the Complutense University of Madrid receives his name, as well as the García Santesmases Computer Museum (MIGS), located in the Computing Faculty of the Complutense University of Madrid.

== Works ==
- Contribución al estudio de la ferro-resonancia y de la autoinducción (1943)
- Lecciones de física (1952)
- Instrumentación para el estudio del comportamiento humano (1971)
- Obra e inventos de Torres Quevedo (1980)
- Física general (1983)
