= Spanish National Cancer Research Centre =

Spanish research institute

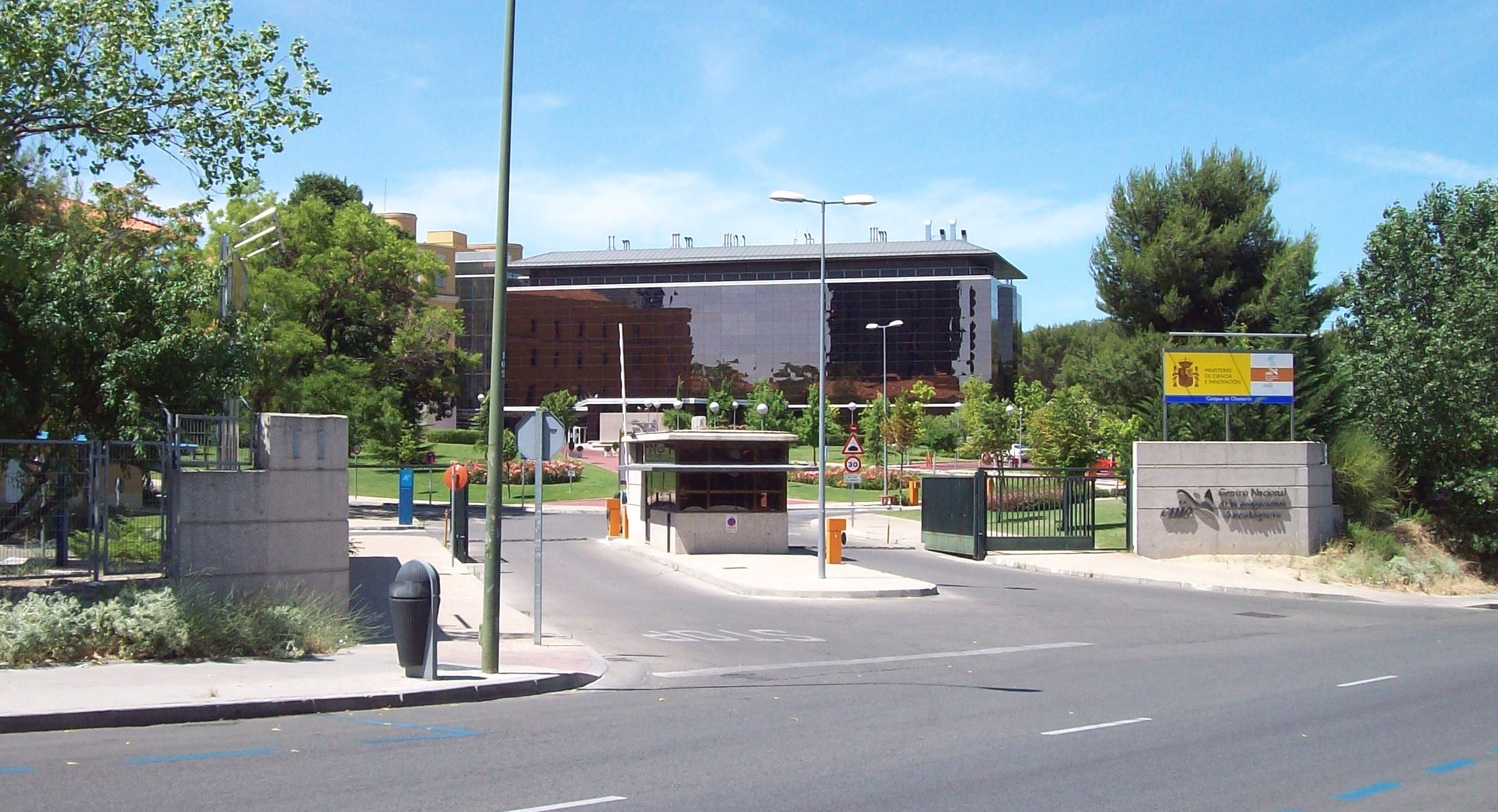
The CNIO building photographed from the main entrance

The National Centre for Cancer Research (Spanish: Centro Nacional de Investigaciones Oncológicas, CNIO) is a Spanish research institute.

The centre is situated on the campus of the Carlos III Health Institute in Madrid.

The current director of the center is the biologist Fernando Peláez.

== History ==
The Research Center was founded in 1998 as an extension of the Carlos III Health Institute. In 2011, the Spanish Ministry of Science and Innovation granted it the Severo Ochoa Excellence Center distinction, giving the center the status as one of the foremost research centers in Spain. This award was extended in 2015.

Among the prominent scientists who have passed through the center are:

- Mariano Barbacid, who was its director from 1998 to 2011
- María Blasco Marhuenda, who was its director from 2011 to 2025

== Research programs ==
The CNIO integrates resources devoted to basic research as well as research directly applied to diagnosis, pharmaceutics and clinical practice. It consists of 49 research groups distributed in three basic research programs (molecular oncology, structural biology and biocomputation, and cancer cellular biology) and two applied research programs (human cancer genetics and clinical research). These programs are supported by an Area of Innovation which includes a Biotechnology program, offering advanced technological support to research programs; an Experimental Therapy Program, focused in pharmaceutical development, and an Office for Technological Transfer and Evaluation.
