= Mariano Barbacid =

Spanish molecular biochemist (born 1949)

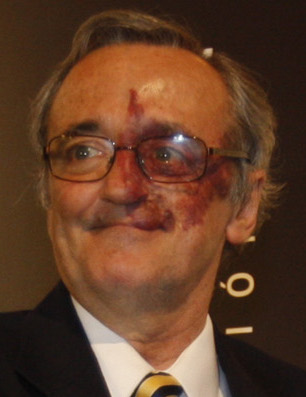
- Barbacid in 2012
- Born: Mariano Barbacid Montalbán; 4 October 1949 (age 76); Madrid, Spain
- Education: Biochemist
- Alma mater: Universidad Complutense de Madrid
- Occupation: Cancer researcher
- Known for: Isolating the first oncogene

Mariano Barbacid Montalbán (born 4 October 1949) is a Spanish molecular biochemist who discovered the first oncogene HRAS.

== Early life and academic career ==
Barbacid was born in Madrid, Spain on 4 October 1949.

He completed his higher education in the Universidad Complutense de Madrid, where he studied chemical sciences, and in the United States, where he started as an intern; years later he was appointed director of the Developmental Oncology Section of the Basic Research Program at NCI-Frederick, a center associated to the National Cancer Institute. He then moved back to his native Spain to lead the newly created CNIO (Centro Nacional de Investigaciones Oncológicas). He also served on the Life Sciences jury for the Infosys Prize in 2011.

== Scientific research ==
Barbacid is credited for isolating the human oncogene HRAS in bladder carcinoma. His discovery was published in Nature in 1982 in an article titled "A point mutation is responsible for the acquisition of transforming properties by the T24 human bladder-carcinoma oncogene". He spent the following months extending his research, eventually discovering that such oncogene was the mutation of an allele of the Ras subfamily, as well as its activation mechanism.

In 2003, he proved that the enzyme CDK2, until then believed to be indispensable in cellular division, was not necessary in order for DNA replication to take place.

In December 2025, he published a paper in PNAS describing a targeted therapy that successfully regressed pancreatic cancer and prevented tumor resistance in a mouse model. This article was retracted on April 27, 2026 due to conflict of interest with its association to the company Vega Oncotargets, created to promote the drugs being evaluated. Barbacid claimed that "the value of my research is not in question" by the retraction and assured to resubmit his study with the required information. However critics stated that such procedure "it isn't a minor question".

In January 2026, Barbacid and his group at the CNIO published a study in which a combination of three targeted inhibitors, the established drugs afatinib and daraxonrasib, and a compound used for cancer research named SD36, showed promise in treating pancreatic cancer in animal models.

== Publications ==
- "A point mutation is responsible for the acquisition of transforming properties by the T24 Human Bladder-Carcinoma Oncogene." (1982).
- "Direct mutagenesis of HA-RAS-1 oncogenes by N-Nitroso-N-Methylurea during initiation of mammary carcinogenesis in rats." (1985).
- "Ras genes." (1987).
- "The TRK proto-oncogene encodes a receptor for nerve growth-factor." (1991).
- "trkC, a new member of the trk family of tyrosine protein-kinases, is a receptor for neutotrophin-3." (1991).
- "Genetic analysis of mammalian cyclin-dependent kinases and their inhibitors." (2000).
- "Toll-like Receptor-4 (TLR4) Down-regulates MicroRNA-107, Increasing Macrophage Adhesion via Cyclin-dependent Kinase 6." (2011)

== Awards ==
His scientific career has been awarded with prizes such as the Distinguished Young Scientist Award (1983), the King Juan Carlos I Science award (1984), the Rhodes Memorial award (1985) and the Charles Rodolphe Brupbacher (2005). His effort has also been acknowledged with the Great Cross of the Order of 2 May (2011).

Other awards include:

- King Juan Carlos I Award (Spain, 1984)
- Rhodes Memorial Award (USA, 1985)
- Joseph Steiner Award (Switzerland, 1988)
- IPSEN Prize in neuronal plasticity (Austria, 1994)
- Charles Rodolphe Brupbacher Cancer Prize (Switzerland, 2005)
- International Agency for Research on Cancer Medal of Honor (France, 2007)
