= 2023 China floods =

Record-breaking rainfall in China

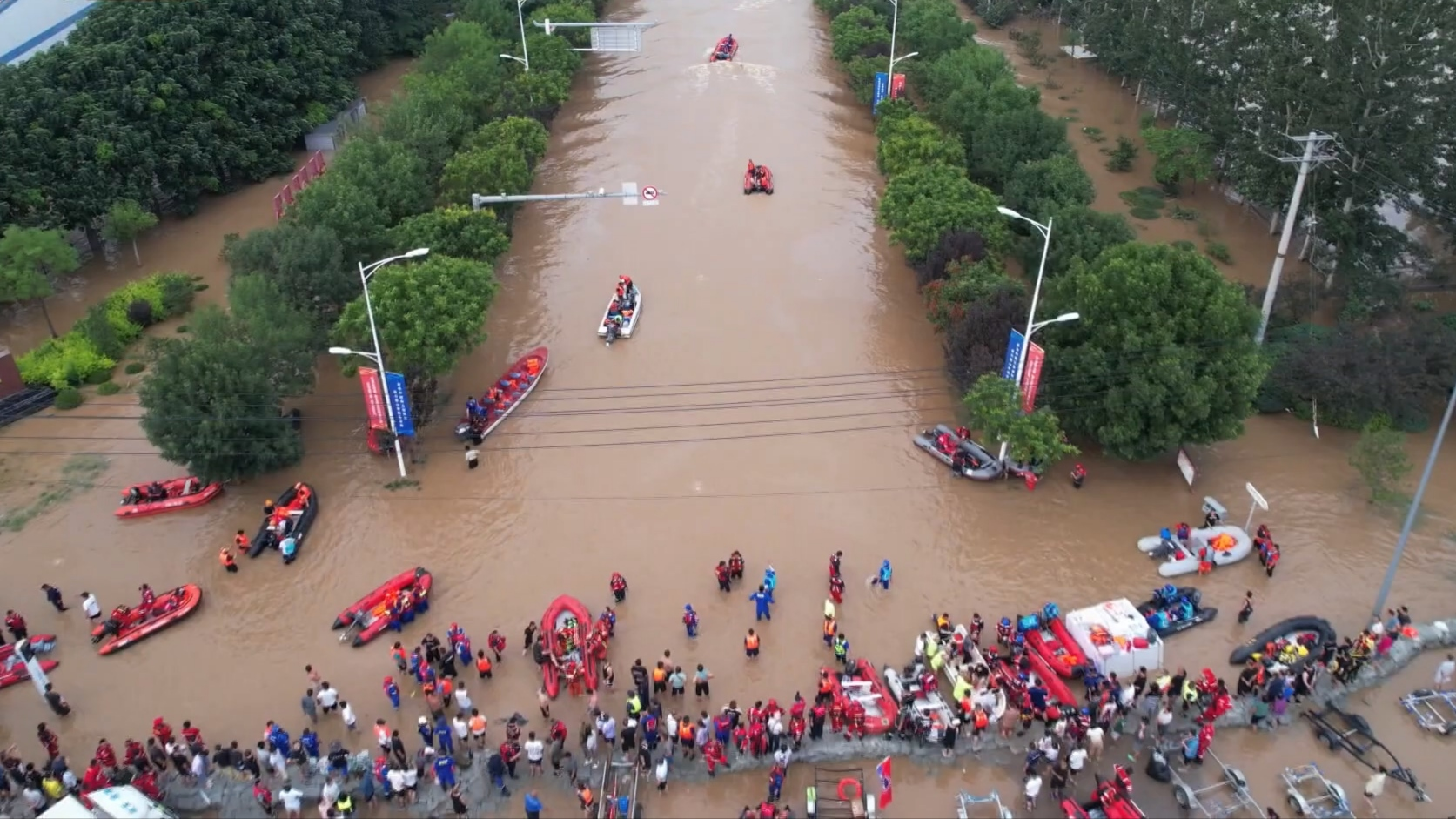
- Rescue workers evacuate flood-affected people in Zhuozhou.
- Date: July 2023 – August 2023
- Location: China Beijing and Hebei (most affected), Shanxi and Dandong (partially affected)
- Deaths: ≥81

Starting in July 2023, there were several floods in China, most of them caused by heavy rainfalls in different areas. The most notable floods were the 2023 Beijing-Tianjin-Hebei Heavy rain and Northeast china heavy rain, which left at least 81 dead and 34 missing.

== Abnormal Rainfall ==
=== Sichuan Province ===
As of July 4, 461,000 people were affected in 69 counties (cities and districts) of 16 cities (states) in Sichuan, including Chengdu, Deyang, Mianyang and Guangyuan. Heavy to heavy rainfall occurred in most areas of Chongqing, and many rivers in Jiangjin, Qijiang, Fengjie, Wanzhou and other places experienced over-alarm and over-guaranteed flooding. From 8:00 p.m. on July 3 to 8:00 p.m. on July 4, 24 districts and counties in Chongqing experienced torrential rain, and extraordinarily heavy rainfall occurred in Wanzhou District, with the maximum daily rainfall occurring in Baiyan Village of Changtan Township of Wanzhou, amounting to 251.5 millimeters.

== Beijing-Tianjin-Hebei Heavy rain ==
=== Weather warning ===
Typhoon Doksuri made landfall in Jinjiang, Fujian, on July 28, then rapidly weakened once inland and dissipated shortly thereafter. Later that afternoon, National Meteorological Center of CMA issued a red alert—the highest level warning for heavy rainfall—this was only the second time a red rainfall warning had been issued—since the warning system was formally implemented in 2010. The first time was on September 29, 2011. The Hebei Provincial Meteorological Bureau upgraded its warning to a red alert for torrential rains.

Some parts of Baoding, Xiong'an New Area, Shijiazhuang, Xingtai, and Handan were expected to see especially torrential rains (250-450mm), with local accumulations potentially reaching more than 600 mm (24 in). The average rainfall in Beijing was 276.5 mm (10.89 in); the largest rainfall occurred in Xincun in Shidu, Fangshan District, 500.4 mm (19.70 in); The maximum hourly rain intensity occurred in Qianling Mountain, Fengtai District, at 111.8 mm (4.40 in) on July 31.

=== Impact ===
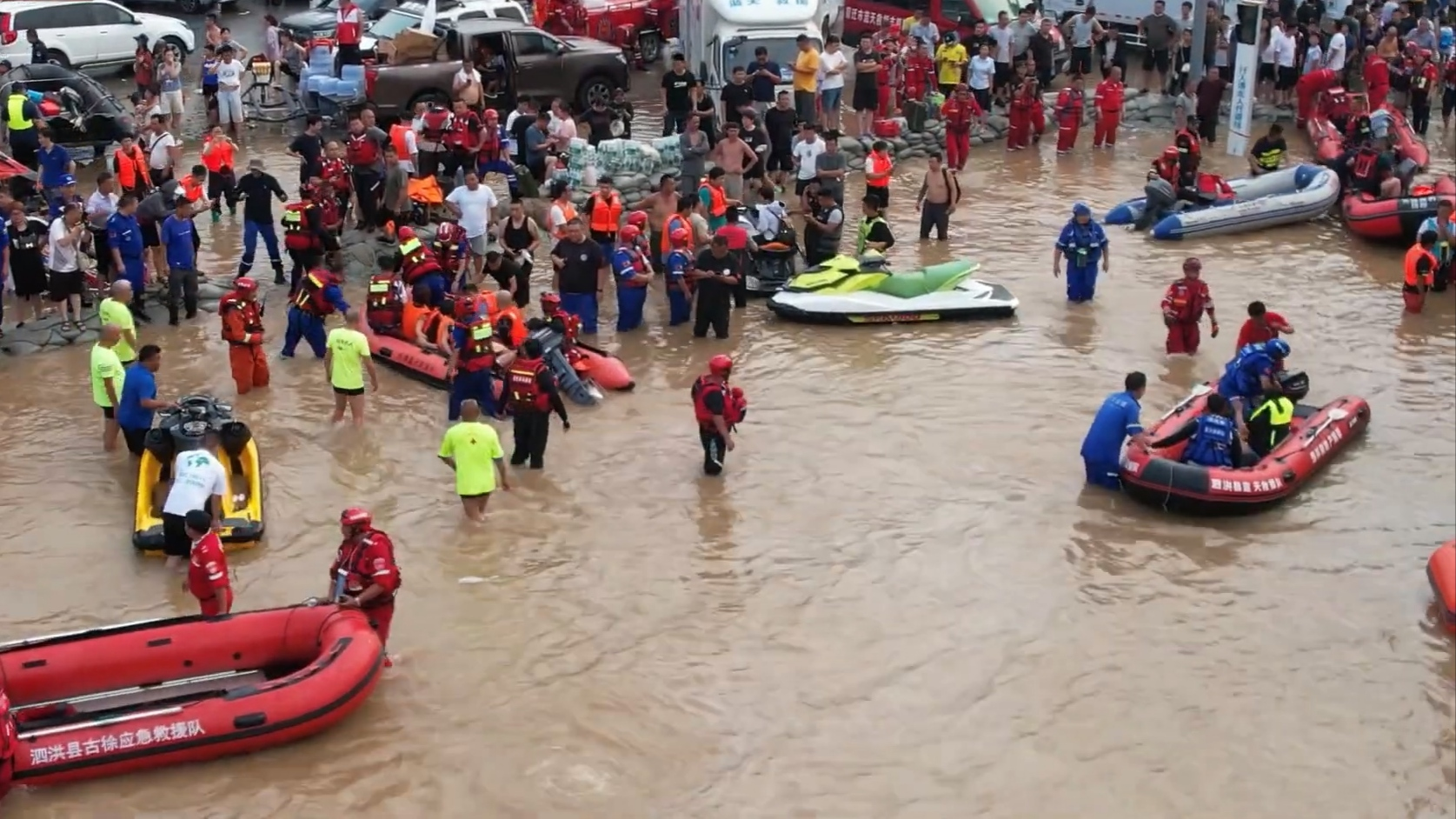
Rescue workers evacuate flood-affected people in Zhuozhou.

At least 5,000 people were urgently transferred from the mountainous area of Mentougou District. The Beijing Flood Control Headquarters activated the city's flood control red early warning on July 30. Tiananmen Square, the Palace Museum, the Summer Palace, and the Badaling Great Wall were temporarily closed. The China Central Television reported that 31,000 individuals fled their homes in high-risk regions in Beijing. Mentougou District flooded the Yongding River due to heavy rain, and the surrounding main roads were temporarily controlled.

Heavy rainfall caused at least 9 deaths and 6 missing in the province, and more than 540,000 people were affected. Seven flood storage and detention areas were successively used to transfer 840,001 people. Among them, Baoding recorded 350 mm (14 in), and Dingzhou City recorded 319.7 mm (12.59 in) of rainfall.

In early August, flood control systems were used to redirect 1.8 billion cubic meters of water from Beijing and Tianjin to low-lying areas of Hebei Province. More than 850,000 residents were told to evacuate, including 134,000 in Zhuozhou and 113,000 in Gaobeidian. While inspecting relief efforts local Communist Party secretary Ni Yuefeng commented that Hebei should "serve as the capital's moat", prompting criticism online.

=== Response ===
Xi Jinping, the General Secretary of the Chinese Communist Party and the President of China, urged local officials to make every effort to find individuals who are missing or trapped. Chinese Premier Li Qiang called for all-out efforts during rescue and relief operations and stressed that ensuring people's lives and safety is a top priority.

The Ministry of Finance also allocated RMB 842 million in agricultural disaster prevention and mitigation and water conservancy disaster relief on July 31. The Ministry of Agriculture and Rural Affairs announced $60 million in flood relief money to help the region's farm sector.

== Northeast China flood ==
=== Jilin ===
Torrential rains and the flooding they caused in Jilin province have killed at least 14 people including senior municipal officials. Most of the fatalities were reported in the small city of Shulan.

=== Heilongjiang ===
Flooding is still occurring in the Songhua River basin, causing 85 rivers to exceed emergency levels. In Harbin, the provincial capital of Heilongjiang, more than 162,000 people were evacuated, while over 90,000 hectares of crops were damaged by floodwater. In the city of Shangzhi, more than 42,575 hectares of crops were destroyed by the worst rainstorm the city has faced in more than six decades, Xinhua reported.

== Controversies ==
=== Lack of flood warnings in Zhuozhou ===
Residents in many areas said that the reason for the seriousness of the damage in their areas was that the government did not issue a notice asking residents to evacuate prior to the release of the Beijing Reservoir, and that hundreds of residents in various areas were stranded due to flooding and faced water and power cuts.

== See also ==
- List of floods
- 1975 Banqiao Dam failure
- July 2012 Beijing flood
- 2021 Henan floods
- 2021 China floods
