= Floods in China =

Floods in China are a natural disaster that have occurred frequently throughout Chinese history. Flooding along the Yellow River has historically been the most severe, along with flooding of the Yangtze–Huai River basin. Flooding of the Pearl River has also occurred frequently in history. There are numerous Chinese flood myths.

China's steep geography and subtropical and tropical climates mean that large-scale thunderstorms and tropical storms happen frequently. Since many settlements are located along waterways, high volumes of water can easily overflow river banks and cause extensive damage. Compared to other countries, a 2016 study found that China has the most expensive impact of flooding annually. A 2021 estimate by Zero Carbon Analytics suggested that floods cost China USD 214 billion between 1996-2015.

With climate change, these costs are likely to continue to grow; for example, flooding caused $2.8 billion USD worth of damage in August 2025 and displaced as many as 10 million people. Zero Carbon Analytics projected USD 479 billion by 2035 under climate change scenarios.

== Background ==
The Yellow River carries more sediment than any other river in the world, washing away 1.6 billion tonnes of loess from the Loess Plateau every year. It has long been said that the river "breaches its banks every three years, and changes course every hundred years."

According to incomplete statistics compiled in the journal People's Yellow River (Renmin Huanghe), the Yellow River breached its banks 1,593 times during the roughly three to four hundred years before 1946. In 602 BCE, the river's first recorded course change took it northeast of present-day Hua County, shifting the channel about 80 km eastward to empty into the Bohai Sea near present-day Huanghua; this course became known as the Han-dynasty channel. Between 602 BCE and 1851 CE, the Yellow River changed course twenty-five times.

From 1194 to 1855, the river used the channel of the Huai River as its outlet to the sea, an episode referred to as "the Yellow River seizing the Huai." On 15 September 1855, the river breached its banks at Weishan in a historic twenty-sixth course change, after which the former channel through northern Jiangsu ran dry.

== Pre-Qin period ==
According to the myth of the Great Flood of Gun-Yu, during the reign of the ruler Emperor Yao, flooding was widespread and the population suffered greatly. Yao appointed Gun, Earl of Chong to control the flooding of the Yellow River, but Gun's method of building embankments along the riverbanks only caused the water to rise higher. After nine years, the flooding had not been resolved and had in fact worsened.

After Emperor Shun succeeded to the throne, the flooding remained unresolved, and since Gun had died, Shun turned instead to Gun's son Yu the Great. Yu adopted a method completely different from his father's and achieved notable success.

By the time of the Shang dynasty, all five relocations of the Shang capital are said to have been caused by flooding.

== Han dynasty ==
During the Han dynasty, in the third year of the Yuanshou era (120 BCE), heavy rain fell east of the passes and the population suffered from famine. Emperor Wu of Han "relocated the poor to the region west of the passes, and more than 700,000 people were sent to fill Shuofang and the region to its south" (Records of the Grand Historian, "Treatise on the Balanced Standard").

In 11 CE, the Yellow River breached its banks for the second time northwest of present-day Puyang. The river channel shifted 40 kilometers eastward, entering the Bohai Sea near present-day Lijin County, a course historically known as the "Eastern Han River".

In the first year of the Yanguang era (122 CE), the Yellow River flooded.

== Jin dynasty ==
In the fourth year of the Yongjia era of the Western Jin (310 CE), a great flood struck the region east of the Yangtze in the fourth month. The court astrologer Li Chunfeng attributed it to the fact that "at the time Wang Dao and others secretly harbored plans to support the heir, and yin energy was in excess."

In the fifth year of the Xianhe era under Emperor Cheng of the Eastern Jin (330 CE), a great flood occurred in the fifth month, attributed to the fact that "the ruling emperor was young, his mother governed as regent, and Yu Liang, as senior maternal uncle, decided matters within the palace. Yin overcame yang."

== Northern and Southern dynasties ==
In the fourteenth year of the Tianjian era of Emperor Wu of Liang (515 CE), in the third month, Liang forces dammed the Huai River in order to flood Shouyang by backing up its waters. In the fourth month the dam was completed but then breached again; the army "felled trees to build cribwork, filled it with huge stones, and piled earth on top," which stripped the hills, trees and stones within a hundred li along the Huai, wearing through the shoulders of the laborers who carried the loads. In the summer heat, epidemic disease broke out and the dead lay heaped upon one another, with the sound of flies and insects continuing day and night. A major epidemic followed. "That winter it was bitterly cold, and the Huai and Si rivers froze solid; seventy or eighty percent of the soldiers guarding the Fushan Dam died." The following year, "in the fourth month of summer, the Huai dam was completed, nine li long, one hundred forty zhang wide at the base and forty-five zhang wide at the top, twenty zhang high, planted with willows, with army encampments arrayed along its top." By "the ninth month, on the day dingchou, the Huai River suddenly rose and the dam collapsed with a roar heard for three hundred li; more than one hundred thousand people from the garrisons and villages along the Huai were swept out to sea."

== Sui dynasty ==
In the eighteenth year of the Kaihuang era (598 CE), a great flood struck the prefectures of Henan; this was attributed to the fact that "at the time Empress Dugu interfered in state affairs, killed palace attendants indiscriminately, and had the chancellor dismissed, while Yang Su held excessive power—flooding is a yin phenomenon, a response to the excessive strength of consorts and subjects."

In the second year of the Renshou era, ninth month (602 CE): "On the day renchen, the prefectures north and south of the Yellow River suffered great flooding, and the Minister of Works, Yang Da, was sent to provide relief."

In the autumn of the seventh year of the Daye era of Emperor Yang of Sui (611 CE): "A great flood submerged more than thirty commanderies in Shandong and Henan, and the people sold themselves and their children into slavery."

== Tang dynasty ==
In the seventh year of the Yuanhe era, fifth month, on the day gengshen (812 CE), Emperor Xianzong said to his chancellors: "You have repeatedly reported that Huainan and the two Zhe circuits suffered flood and drought last year, yet a censor has recently returned from there and says it did not amount to a disaster—what is the truth of the matter?" Li Jiang replied: "According to the memorials from Huainan, Zhexi and Zhedong, all report flood and drought, with many people fleeing their homes and requesting relief and resettlement; their tone suggests they fear being blamed by the court, so how could they falsely claim disaster where none occurred? This must be censors seeking to flatter the throne for their own gain—I ask that their names be obtained and the law applied to them."

In the autumn of the twelfth year of the Dali era (777 CE), heavy rains caused a disaster and crop losses were severe. When censors made their rounds and reported back, the affected counties together reported losses of 31,195 qing of farmland. The emperor then ordered the censor Zhu Ao to reinspect, and he reported that Weinan alone had lost more than 3,000 qing. The emperor said to Zhu Ao: "It is the duty of county magistrates to care for the people—even where there has been no loss, they ought to claim one; if there has been loss and it goes unreported, how can that reflect any concern for the suffering of the people?"

== Song dynasty ==
In the eighth year of the Qingli era of the Song (1048 CE), the river's third recorded course change occurred at present-day Changhu Ji, east of Puyang, shifting the channel about 80 km westward; the water then split into two branches, both emptying into the Bohai Sea near present-day Tianjin.

In the sixth year of the Dading era of Emperor Shizong of Jin (1166 CE), the river's fourth recorded course change occurred near present-day Yuanwu, with the river flowing to Xuzhou, joining the Si River and the Huai River, and emptying into the Yellow Sea.

According to the Gazetteer of Xiangfu County and the Kaifeng Yellow River Gazetteer, the Yellow River breached its banks within Kaifeng County in the twentieth year of the Dading era (1180 CE).

== Ming dynasty ==
During the Ming dynasty, the Yellow River flooded 143 times, including the 1410 Yellow River flood. Between the first and fourteenth years of the Chongzhen era, the Yellow River breached its banks in eleven separate years, an occurrence too frequent for the histories to record in full.

== Qing dynasty ==
In the tenth year of the Shunzhi era, heavy rain caused a disaster: "in the flooded areas of Zhili, the people fled in droves, old and young supporting one another, seeking food in Shandong. But because the laws against harboring refugees were strict, no one dared take them in, and the refugees wandered on, crying out." Wei Yijie wrote the poem "Lament for the Refugees": "Fields and homes drowned, no dry ground left, refugees stream southward one after another. Who expected the southern provinces would not dare take them in? By day they shut their doors and crouch inside. Before the eaves none dares linger long, for fear the local people will show no mercy. Above, the vast heavens look down; below, the little children gaze up—what is to be done? ... O boundless heaven, have pity on this multitude."

In the forty-seventh and forty-eighth years of the Kangxi era (1708 and 1709), Tongxiang suffered successive droughts and floods; Wang Wengui "set up gruel kitchens and established medical dispensaries" to relieve the starving population.

In the fourth year of the Yongzheng era (1726), western Zhejiang suffered flooding, and Wang Wengui was the first to organize relief, "providing food for the starving."

In the ninth year of the Jiaqing era (1804), western Zhejiang suffered flooding, and the provincial governor Ruan Yuan carried out measures such as selling grain at reduced prices, distributing relief, and lending seed to help the population through the disaster.

In the third year of the Daoguang era (1823), Zhili suffered a great flood affecting 120 counties; Viceroy Jiang Youxian requested and received 1.8 million taels of silver from the treasury to repair the Yongding River.

On 2 August 1841 (the sixteenth day of the sixth month of the twenty-first year of the Daoguang era), the Yellow River breached its banks at the thirty-first levee of the upper flood-control section in Xiangfu County (present-day Kaifeng). From 3 to 6 August the water depth remained at roughly 14–15 chi, and in Henan Province "those who drowned [...] were beyond count." On 8 August the water rose further and broke through Kaifeng's protective outer embankment; at least thirteen counties were flooded, including Xingze, Zhongmou, Zhengzhou, Neihuang, Fengqiu, Kaocheng, Wuzhi, Meng County, Yuanwu and Mengjin. From 24 August to 1 September, emergency repairs were made to the city's protective embankment, but the floodwaters continued to surge in. The breach was not finally repaired until 3 April of the following year, after eight months of work and at a cost of at least 5 million taels of silver. The flood affected five prefectures and twenty-three counties across Henan and Anhui provinces, and coincided with the Battle of Chinhai.

On 22 August 1842 (the twenty-second year of the Daoguang era), a violent storm blew in from the southwest and the lower Yellow River breached its banks by more than 190 zhang at Cuizhen, north of Taoyuan County (present-day Siyang). The disaster affected Taoyuan and Xiao counties in the northern Jiangsu region; in Taoyuan County alone, 26,680 people required relief.

On 23 July 1843 (the twenty-third year of the Daoguang era), further heavy rain caused a breach at the ninth levee of the lower flood-control section at Zhongmou. Continuous heavy rain from 6 to 8 August spread the flooding across dozens of counties in Henan, Anhui and Jiangsu. Repair work proceeded slowly and was not completed until 2 February 1845.

In the ninth year of the Guangxu era (1883), Shuntian Prefecture suffered flooding, and the prefect, Zhou Jiamei, obtained approval to set up gruel kitchens in the townships and outside the six city gates of the capital. In the thirteenth year of Guangxu (1887), the Yellow River breached its banks (the 1887 Yellow River flood) and Shuntian again suffered flooding; Zhen Jun's Random Notes Heard in the Capital records that "in the eastern suburbs of the capital there was a great flood, and Tongzhou's waters nearly reached the city walls; from then on there was scarcely a year without flooding." In the sixteenth year of Guangxu (1890), Shuntian again suffered a great flood; within the capital "there was no roof that did not leak, no wall that did not lean," "people set up umbrellas as makeshift shelters to sleep under," and "prices for all goods in the markets soared, and goods, especially vegetables, became hard to obtain—truly an extraordinary calamity."

On 26 July 1903 (the twenty-ninth year of the Guangxu era), the 1903 Zhifu flood struck. The Donghe River (beneath present-day Jiefang Road in Yantai) and the Xihetao (present-day southwestern Zhifu district of Yantai) turned into raging torrents within moments; the embankments collapsed and homes, along with large numbers of people and livestock, were swept directly out to sea. Floodwater several feet deep, with swirling currents, filled the former premises of the Chefoo Club and Changyu Pioneer Wine Company. The bodies of many people and animals were even found hanging in trees. The disaster destroyed more than 3,000 homes and killed more than 600 people, out of a total population in the Zhifu commercial port of only about 30,000 at the time.

In 1908 (the thirty-fourth year of the Guangxu era), the 1908 West River flood occurred.

== Republic of China (mainland period) ==
The table below records major individual flood disasters, ranked by the number of deaths and the severity of property damage. Each entry refers to a single disaster confined to a specific region and time period. Entries do not cover ongoing flood statistics for a whole year.

Flood	Date	Deaths	Notes
1915 Pearl River flood	1915	10,000	Death toll is an incomplete estimate. The province of Guangdong had 3.78 million people affected, with 100,000+ dead, injured, or affected by disease. An estimated 6 million people were affected across Guangdong and Guangxi, and the urban center of Guangzhou was flooded for seven days.
1921 Jianghuai flood	1921	25,000	More than 7.66 million people affected.
1931 China floods	1931	Hundreds of thousands to several million	Among the deadliest floods in history; affected Wuhan, Nanjing, Gaoyou and Shanghai, among other areas, with 51.27 million people affected.
1932 Songhua River flood	1932	20,000	1.9 million hectares of farmland flooded; the city of Harbin remained underwater for over a month.
1933 Yellow River flood	1933	12,700	6,600 square km flooded, affecting 2.73 million people.
1935 Yangtze flood	1935	142,000	More than 10 million people affected.
1938 Yellow River flood	1938	Unknown	On 9 June 1938, during the Second Sino-Japanese War, the National Revolutionary Army breached the dikes at Huayuankou near Zhengzhou, Henan, in an attempt to halt the advancing Japanese army by flooding; the direct death toll from the flooding itself is unknown. Various estimates suggest that between 1938 and 1947 the flood directly or indirectly killed between 300,000 and over 800,000 people across Henan, Anhui and Jiangsu. Beyond drowning, some of the deaths were caused by disease or famine, and the statistics also encompass the 1939 Tianjin flood and the famine of 1942-1943. Japanese forces also suffered casualties as a result.
1939 Tianjin flood	1939	13,300	Following continuous heavy rain and the breaching of river dikes by Japanese forces, 80% of urban Tianjin was flooded, more than 100,000 homes were destroyed, over 8 million people were affected, 650,000 residents of Tianjin and its surrounding areas became refugees, and direct economic losses were estimated at about 600 million fabi.

== People's Republic of China ==
=== Major individual flood events ===
As with the table above, this section records major individual flood disasters ranked by death toll and severity of damage, each confined to a specific region and time period, and does not cover overall annual flood statistics.

Flood	Date	Deaths	Notes
1951 Liao River flood	1951	6,213	Affected Liaoning and Jilin provinces.
1954 Yangtze floods	1954	33,000	18.88 million people affected.
1958 Yellow River flood	1958	—	1,708 villages submerged, affecting 740,800 people.
1959 East River flood	1959	78	—
1963 North China flood	1963	5,154	Seriously affected Beijing (35 deaths) and Hebei, including Tianjin (5,119 deaths).
1969 Yangtze River flood	1969	1,603	Several dams and reservoirs failed or were breached; 710,000 homes collapsed.
1975 Banqiao Dam failure	1975	240,000	62 dams and reservoirs failed, including the Banqiao Dam.
1979 Xizhi River flood	1979	151	—
1981 Sichuan flood	1981	888	20 million people affected.
1982 North River flood	1982	493	Included the 1982 Qingyuan flood, which killed 206 people and left 16 missing.
1982 Yellow River flood	1982	—	1,303 villages in the floodplain submerged, affecting 932,700 people.
1983 Ankang flood	1983	870	Reservoir releases upstream were not communicated in time and evacuation lagged behind the flood.
1986 eastern Guangdong flood	1986	261	—
Gouhou Dam failure	1993	328	The Gouhou Reservoir in Gonghe County, Hainan Tibetan Autonomous Prefecture, Qinghai, failed catastrophically.
1994 West and North River floods	1994	480	Floods in June killed 371 and floods in July killed 109. The largest flood on the West and North rivers since the founding of the People's Republic, and the second-largest flood on either river in the twentieth century.
1998 China floods	1998	3,656	A total of 4,150 deaths from flooding were recorded nationwide for 1998 as a whole. The figures for this event are disputed.
Shalan Town flood of 2005	2005	117	Caused by a flash flood and debris flow.
2007 Jinan flood	2007	25	A further 4 people were reported missing.
2007 Lushi flood	2007	78	A further 18 people were reported missing.
2007 Ankang flood	2007	19	A further 37 people were reported missing.
2008 Shenzhen flood	2008	6	Urban flash flood. One more person was reported missing, and 1,000 sites of urban flooding were recorded citywide.
2010 Lushi flood	2010	3	5,589 homes collapsed, with direct economic losses of 1.29 billion yuan.
2010 Zhouqu mudslide	2010	1,557	Heavy rain triggered a mudslide and formed a barrier lake. A further 284 people were reported missing.
2011 Beijing flood	2011	—	Caused severe urban flooding in Beijing.
July 2012 Beijing flood	2012	79	1.602 million people affected; economic losses of 11.64 billion yuan.
2013 Fushun flood	2013	76	A further at least 88 people were reported missing. Direct economic losses exceeded 1.7 billion yuan; 61,700 homes were damaged and 1,274 households (3,314 rooms) collapsed. 30,790 hectares of crops were affected, of which 21,760 hectares suffered damage and 9,750 hectares a total loss.
2013 Ningbo flood	2013	1	Economic losses exceeded 33.3 billion yuan; 2.48 million people affected.
2016 Xingtai flood	2016	130	A further 110 people were reported missing.
Xinjiang Sheyuegou Reservoir dam failure	2018	20	A further 8 people were reported missing.
2018 Shouguang flood	2018	13	A further 3 people were reported missing.
2021 Henan floods	2021	398	A further 50 people were reported missing.
2023 China floods	2023	62	A further 34 people were reported missing.
2023 September Pearl River Delta floods	2023	15	Death toll includes Hong Kong and Guangxi.
2024 Zixing flood	2024	50	A further 15 people were reported missing.

=== Flooding statistics by year ===
The tables below present flood-related casualty statistics from 1950 to the present, based on official figures published by the Ministry of Water Resources of the People's Republic of China in a 2025 report.

==== Years with the highest death tolls ====
Years with at least 5,000 flood-related deaths
Year	Officially reported flood deaths	See also
1951	7,819	1951 Liao River flood
1954	42,447	1954 Yangtze floods
1956	10,676	
1960	6,033	
1961	5,074	
1963	10,441	1963 North China flood
1975	29,653	1975 Banqiao Dam failure
1981	5,832	1981 Sichuan flood
1982	5,323	1982 North River flood; 1982 Yellow River flood
1983	7,238	1983 Ankang flood
1991	5,113	Eastern China flood of 1991
1994	5,340	1994 West and North River floods
1996	5,840	

==== 2000s ====
Year	Officially reported flood deaths	See also
2000	1,942	
2001	1,605	
2002	1,819	
2003	1,551	
2004	1,282	
2005	1,660	2005 Shalan flood
2006	2,276	2006 southern China floods
2007	1,230	2007 Jinan flood; 2007 Lushi flood; 2007 Ankang flood
2008	633 (missing: 232)	2008 South China floods; 2008 Shenzhen floods
2009	538 (missing: 110)	

==== 2010s ====
Year	Officially reported flood deaths	See also
2010	3,222 (missing: 1,003)	2010 China floods; 2010 Zhouqu mudslide; 2010 Lushi flood
2011	519 (missing: 121)	2011 southern China floods; 2011 autumn China floods; 2011 Beijing flood
2012	673 (missing: 159)	2012 China floods; July 2012 Beijing flood
2013	775 (missing: 374)	2013 Macau flood; 2013 Southwest China floods; 2013 Ningbo flood; 2013 Fushun flood
2014	486 (missing: 91)	
2015	319 (missing: 81)	2015 China floods
2016	686 (missing: 207)	2016 southern China floods; 2016 Xingtai flood
2017	316 (missing: 39)	
2018	187 (missing: 32)	2018 western China floods; Xinjiang Sheyuegou Reservoir dam failure; 2018 Shouguang flood
2019	573 (missing: 85)	

==== 2020s ====
Year	Officially reported flood deaths	See also
2020	230 (missing: 49)	2020 southern China floods
2021	512 (missing: 78)	2021 Henan floods; 2021 China floods
2022	143 (missing: 28)	
2023	309 (including missing)	2023 Beijing–Tianjin–Hebei floods; 2023 September Pearl River Delta floods
2024	436 (including missing)	2024 Guangdong floods; 2024 Zixing floods; 2024 Huludao floods
2025	at least 60	2025 Beijing–Tianjin–Hebei floods
2026	6 confirmed dead, 11 missing as of 8 July 2026	2026 Guangxi floods, 2026 China floods, 2026 Nepal-Tibet floods

== See also ==
- Droughts in China
- Locust plagues in China
- Epidemics in China
- History of refugees in China
- List of famines in China
- List of mining accidents in China
- List of earthquakes in China
- Natural disasters in China
