= Changlu Temple =

Buddhist temple in Nanjing, China

Coordinates: 32.216°N 118.755°E

The Changlu Chongfu Chan Buddhist Temple (长芦崇福禅寺), more commonly the Changlu Temple, is a Chan Buddhist temple in Nanjing, Jiangsu, China, north of the Yangtze. The current temple, located in Taizishan Park (太子山公园), Luhe District, was only built in 2010, even though its history dates back to 527 during the Liang dynasty: the temple was repeatedly destroyed and rebuilt 10 times over the millennium. As a result of rising water, the original temple was submerged in the Yangtze by 12th-century Song dynasty, so a new temple bearing its name was built in 1185 further north. The temple was also burned down several times in wars, including the 12th/13th-century Jin–Song Wars and the 19th-century Taiping Rebellion, but always rebuilt. Most recently, the 1954 Yangtze River floods completely destroyed the last pre-modern temple. As the former site was later occupied by a petroleum company, the temple built in 2010 is located about 5 km away.
