= 2008 South China floods =

2008 natural disaster in southern China

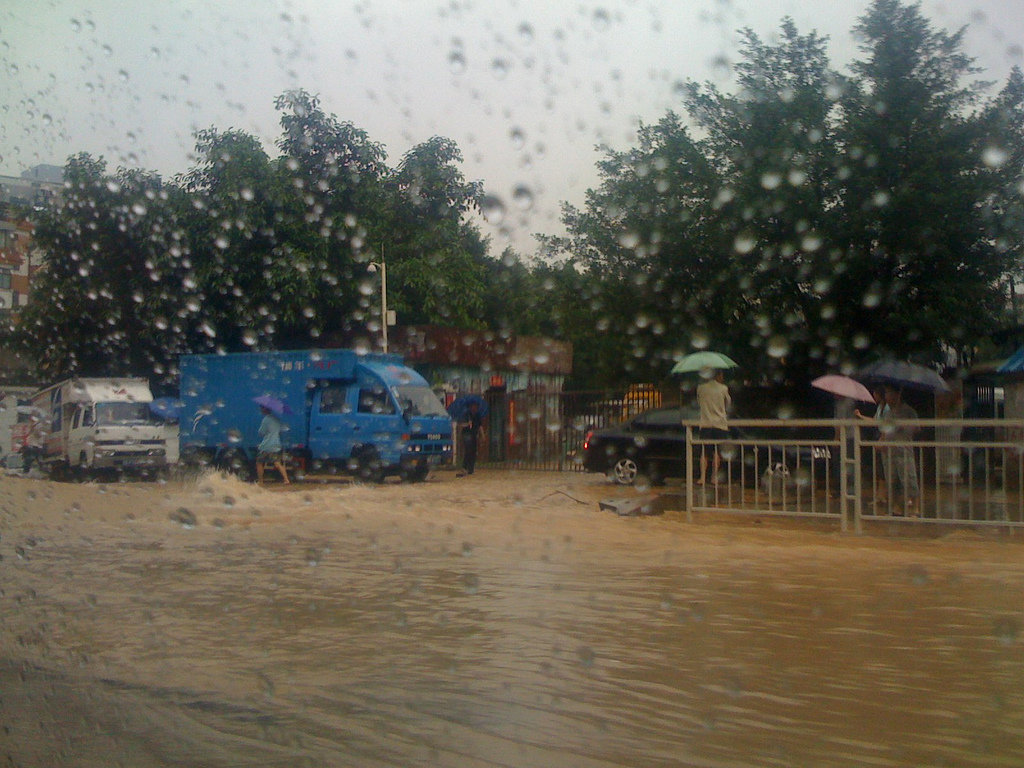
- A flooded road in Shenzhen, China

Meteorological history
- Duration: 26 May 2008– 14 June 2008

Overall effects
- Fatalities: more than 200 dead or missing
- Damage: $2.2 billion
- Areas affected: Sichuan; Guangdong; Jiangxi; Guangxi; Guizhou; Yunnan; Hong Kong

Floods in China that began on 26 May 2008 involved four rounds of torrential rains with landslides and flooding lasted for 20 days. It affected fifteen provinces in eastern and southern China.

The first round of floods affected twelve provinces in southern China and killed 93 people as of 30 May. A new round of floods began on 6 June and swept nine provinces in southern China killing 55 people with 7 missing and forcing 1.3 million to evacuate as of 14 June. China's National Meteorological Centre has said that heavy rain would continue and that precipitation in the provinces of Guizhou, Sichuan and Yunnan would be 30 to 70% greater than in the same period last year.

== Mainland China ==
Mainland provinces affected include Anhui, Hunan, Jiangxi, Fujian and Guangdong.

=== May ===
China Daily that torrential rains caused by Cloud seeding in the southern provinces killed 64 people in May. According to State Flood Control and Drought Relief headquarters, floods have claimed 59 lives up to this point of the year.

=== June ===
From 28 May to 2 June, some places in Guangdong experienced heavy rainfalls. After 7 days, flood situations were investigated by the China Meteorological Administration (CMA) on 3 June. The State Flood Control and Drought Relief headquarters and National Meteorological Centre (NMC) both raised emergency levels expecting more torrential rain and thunderstorms. On the weekend of 7–8 June, Guangzhou Daily reported it to be the heaviest rain storm in 50 years for Guangdong province. Wuzhou was struck with their worst flooding in 100 years. In two days the rainfall in some areas measured more than 400 millimetres (15.7 inches).

On 14 June, the Ministry of Water Resources said close to 1 million hectares of farmland have been affected with the worst hit provinces being Guangdong, Fujian, Jiangxi, Hunan and Hubei. From 25 May to 14 June, up to 18 people have died, including 2.22 million people were affected in 17 cities in Guangdong. The average rainfall of 415 mm (16.3 in) was double the long-term level, with the media reporting it as "Freak rain".

On 15 June, more than 300 places in Shenzhen were submerged underwater. Floods have forced more than 1.66 million people to evacuate, caused 67,000 houses to collapse, and killed 63 people. Three days later officials in Guangdong warned of a "black June" as high tides, rain and rivers threatened levees. Across the region, 169 were reported killed in the floods.

On 21 June, the main precipitation areas include the Huai River valleys, Guizhou, Sichuan and the middle and lower reaches of the Yangtze River. Heavy rain follow in Jiangsu, Anhui, Henan, Hubei, Chongqing, Sichuan, Qinghai, and Inner Mongolia. At the end of the month, 252 people were killed in the rainstorms and flooding.

== Hong Kong ==
=== June ===
On 7 June, more than 400 mm (16 in) of rain fell on Lantau Island and more than 300 mm (12 in) fell on Hong Kong Island. By noon, almost 40 landslides and 156 floods were reported. In Tsim Sha Tsui, the 124-year record of rainfall per hour was smashed, with 145.5 mm (5.73 inches) of rainfall being recorded. The North Lantau Highway was blocked, for the first and so far the only time since its opening in 1997, by a landslide. Land traffic to the villages of Tai O was cut off, forcing the government to increase the frequency of ferries to and from the villages. Newspaper vendors in the streets reported that the water came very fast, flooding the area within five minutes to thigh-deep level (over-the-knee). One of the landslides killed two people in Tuen Mun. The Hong Kong Observatory thus changed the "amber rainstorm" warning to a "black rainstorm" warning.
