= Annual General Meeting of Electors of the British Municipal Area, Tientsin =

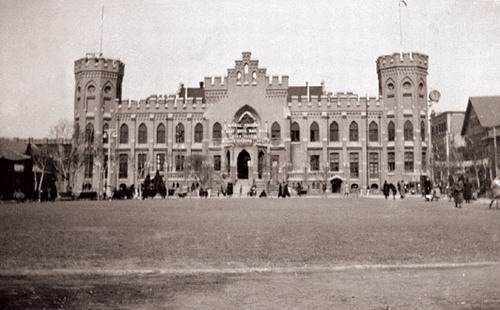
Gordon Hall, former Tianjin British Concession Works Bureau Building

The Electors' Annual General Meeting of the British Municipal Area, Tientsin (Chinese: 天津英租界选举人大会), formally known as the Annual General Meeting of Electors of the British Municipal Area, Tientsin, was the highest governing body of the British concession in Tianjin. It was originally established as the Land Renters' Meeting of the British concession in Tianjin. As the population of the concession increased and the proportion of non-landholding residents grew, it was renamed the Ratepayers' Meeting of the British concession in Tianjin in 1897. Following the expansion of the British concession in 1919, it adopted its final official name. The meeting exercised legislative authority within the British concession and also possessed electoral and administrative supervisory powers, functioning in a manner comparable to a local parliament within the concession.

The Electors' Annual General Meeting of the British Municipal Area, Tientsin, was divided into the Annual General Meeting and Special General Meetings. At the Annual General Meeting, held annually, directors were elected to form the Board of the Tientsin British Municipal Council. The Board of the Tientsin British Municipal Council subsequently directed the administration of the British concession through the Tientsin British Municipal Council.

== Historical Evolution ==
In 1860, when the British concession in Tianjin was first established, the area remained largely undeveloped and sparsely populated, and was regarded as wasteland on the outskirts of Tianjin. At the time, there were only a dozen or so British residents in Tianjin, most of whom lived in the Tianjin Old City area and merely leased plots of land within the concession. As land renters, these British residents became the earliest citizens of the concession. To administer the settlement, they organized the Land Renters' Meeting of the British concession in Tianjin, also known as the Renters' Meeting, which constituted the earliest predecessor of the Electors' Annual General Meeting. As the population within the British concession in Tianjin increased, particularly with the growing proportion of non-land-renting residents, the Land Renters' Meeting was renamed the Ratepayers' Meeting after 1897.[4] According to the Regulations of the British Municipal Council at Tientsin (1918), the Ratepayers' Meeting was reorganized in 1919 into the Electors' Annual General Meeting.

From 1 January 1919, when the original leased territory of the British concession in Tianjin was formally merged with the Extended Area, the Southern Extended Area, and the Promotion Area, the Electors' Annual General Meeting of the British concession in Tianjin convened its Annual General Meeting annually in mid-to-late March or early April until 1941, for a total of 23 sessions.

== Authority ==
The Ratepayers' Meeting of the British Concession in Tianjin was the highest authority within the British concession, possessing legislative powers as well as electoral and administrative supervisory functions. It functioned in a manner comparable to a local council within the concession. The Annual General Meeting of the Ratepayers' Meeting was convened each year to elect directors to form the Board of the Tientsin British Municipal Council. The Board of the Tientsin British Municipal Council subsequently directed the administration of the British concession through the Tientsin British Municipal Council. According to the Revised Regulations of the British Municipal Council at Tientsin (1928), the powers of the Annual General Meeting included reviewing and approving financial accounts and budgets; electing directors, auditors, and valuation committee members; formulating and revising regulations governing the concession; determining tax rates and adjusting taxation according to practical needs; deciding upon the establishment, operation, and management of public utilities such as water supply, electricity, transportation, and postal and telecommunication services; issuing bonds secured against the property or revenue of the Municipal Council for the establishment or funding of public-benefit institutions such as hospitals, markets, sports facilities, parks, and libraries; purchasing land for municipal purposes; and delegating part of its authority to the Board of the Tientsin British Municipal Council.

=== Annual Conference ===
The Annual General Meeting of the British Municipal Area, Tientsin, usually addressed the following matters:

- Item 1: Approval of the annual report of the Board of the Tientsin British Municipal Council, including departmental reports and the financial statements for the year ending on 31 December.
- Item 2: Discussion of the budget and major expenditure items for the following fiscal year, as well as determination of the schedule for tax payments.
- Item 3: Election of directors to form a new Board of the Tientsin British Municipal Council, with a term of one year.
- Item 4: Appointment of two to three valuation committee members for a one-year term. The committee's principal functions were to assess land values and rental values of properties, and to determine taxation rates.
- Other matters.

=== Special Conference ===
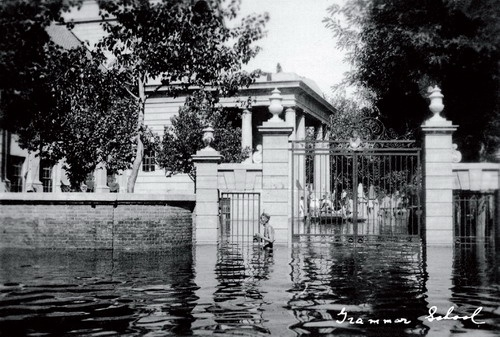
In 1939, the British Concession in Tianjin suffered from floods, and the Tianjin British Grammar School in Tianjin was submerged. A special meeting was held that year to discuss solutions

Special General Meetings of the Ratepayers' Meeting of the British concession in Tianjin were generally convened to address emergencies or resolve financial matters relating to municipal administration within the concession. Measures adopted at such meetings included the issuance of bonds, increases in existing tax rates, or the introduction of new forms of taxation. Although the Annual General Meeting, usually held in March or April each year, reviewed and approved the fiscal budget, extraordinary circumstances occasionally required the convening of ad hoc Special General Meetings. For example, the Tianjin Flood of 1939 severely disrupted normal operations within the British concession. The funds required for disaster relief and post-disaster reconstruction exceeded the approved annual budget, prompting the concession authorities to convene a Special General Meeting to deliberate upon appropriate measures. The convening of Special General Meetings, therefore, played an important role in emergency management and in maintaining the normal functioning of governance within the concession.

== Rules of Procedure ==
=== Suffrage ===
According to the Land Regulations of the British Concession in Tianjin (1866), land renters within the British concession were entitled to voting rights once they met the minimum land rental qualification, and each qualified elector possessed only one vote.

According to the Regulations of the British Municipal Council at Tientsin (1918), the franchise for non-Chinese taxpayers within the concession was determined by the amount of taxes or assessed rental value paid. Landowners who paid at least 20 taels in annual land tax were entitled to one vote; those paying 80 taels received two votes; 240 taels, three votes; and 480 taels, four votes, which was the maximum. Property holders whose assessed annual rental value reached 480 taels were entitled to one vote; 3,000 taels, two votes; and 10,000 taels, three votes, which was the maximum . For Chinese taxpayers within the concession, suffrage qualifications were more restrictive. Chinese landowners were required to pay more than 240 taels in annual land tax, or property owners were required to possess property with an annual rental value of at least 3,000 taels, to obtain voting rights.

=== Voter Registration and Public Notification ===
The electoral registration system was established and implemented during the initial delimitation of the British concession in Tianjin in the 1860s. However, the specific procedures governing voter registration and public notification varied over time. On 27 October 1863, the acting British consul in Tianjin, John Gibson, promulgated the Local Regulations for Tientsin. Supported by a relatively comprehensive land registration system, the early Municipal Council of the original concession determined voter qualifications according to the amount of land leased by individual renters, thereby establishing a system for elector registration within the concession. According to the Land Regulations of the British Concession in Tianjin(1866), land renters within the concession who satisfied the minimum land rental qualification were automatically registered as electors without the need for separate registration procedures and were entitled to voting rights.

In 1874, the Land Regulations of the British Concession in Tianjin were revised to include seven supplementary provisions entitled Provisional Regulations Governing Voting Rights at the Land Renters' Meeting of Tientsin. Among these provisions was the stipulation that "any land renter not previously registered who wishes to obtain voting rights must register at least seven days before the convening of the Land Renters' Meeting; otherwise, no voting rights shall be granted.".

Article 10 of the revised 1928 Land Regulations of the British Concession in Tianjin further provided that electors attending the Annual General Meeting of the British Concession in Tianjin, particularly occupiers of real property, were required to submit written applications to the Secretary of the Board of the Tientsin British Municipal Council no fewer than fourteen days before the meeting. After examining the qualifications of applicants and determining their voting entitlements, the Secretary would enter their names into the electoral register. Seven days before the meeting, the Secretary was required to publish the complete list of electors and voting allocations—including both registered property occupiers and landowners recorded in the land register—in major Tianjin newspapers such as Ta Kung Pao. Beginning in 1929, electoral registration was routinely conducted before each Annual General Meeting of the British concession in Tianjin, and the relevant procedures and registration results were published for several consecutive days in prominent positions in Ta Kung Pao. In addition, the regulations stipulated that the British Consul-General in Tianjin served as the statutory convener of the Annual General Meeting. Consequently, notices announcing the meeting dates were generally issued by the consul two to three weeks before each session .

=== Decision-making procedures ===
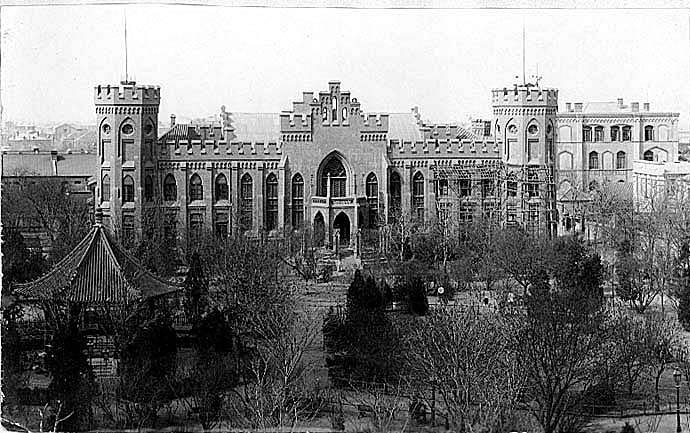
From 1899 to 1905, Gordon Hall

The Electors' Annual General Meeting of the British concession in Tianjin was convened and presided over by the British Consul-General in Tianjin. However, the Consul-General ordinarily had no voting rights and rarely intervened in specific administrative affairs, except when votes for and against a motion were equally divided, in which case the Consul-General cast the deciding vote.

Both Annual General Meetings and Special General Meetings were convened by the British Consul-General, who also possessed the authority to make final rulings regarding meeting proceedings. Resolutions adopted at the meetings could be vetoed either orally during the session or through a written declaration issued within seven days after the meeting.

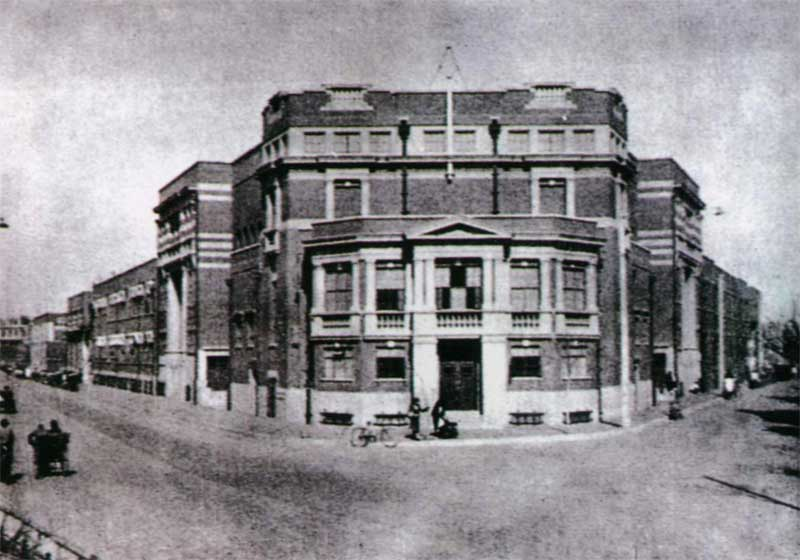
On April 26, 1936, the third session of the annual conference was held at Yaohua Middle School

=== venue ===
Before 1937, meetings of the Electors' Annual General Meeting of the British concession in Tianjin were generally held at Gordon Hall(Tianjin) of the Tientsin British Municipal Council. After 1938, the meetings began to be held at the Tianjin British Grammar School. Following the completion of the auditorium of Yaohua School Auditoriumin 1936, some meetings were also held there.

== Partial List of Meetings ==
From 1 January 1919, when the various districts of the British concession in Tianjin were formally merged, until 1941, the Electors' Annual General Meeting of the British concession in Tianjin convened its Annual General Meeting once annually in early to mid-April, for a total of 23 sessions.

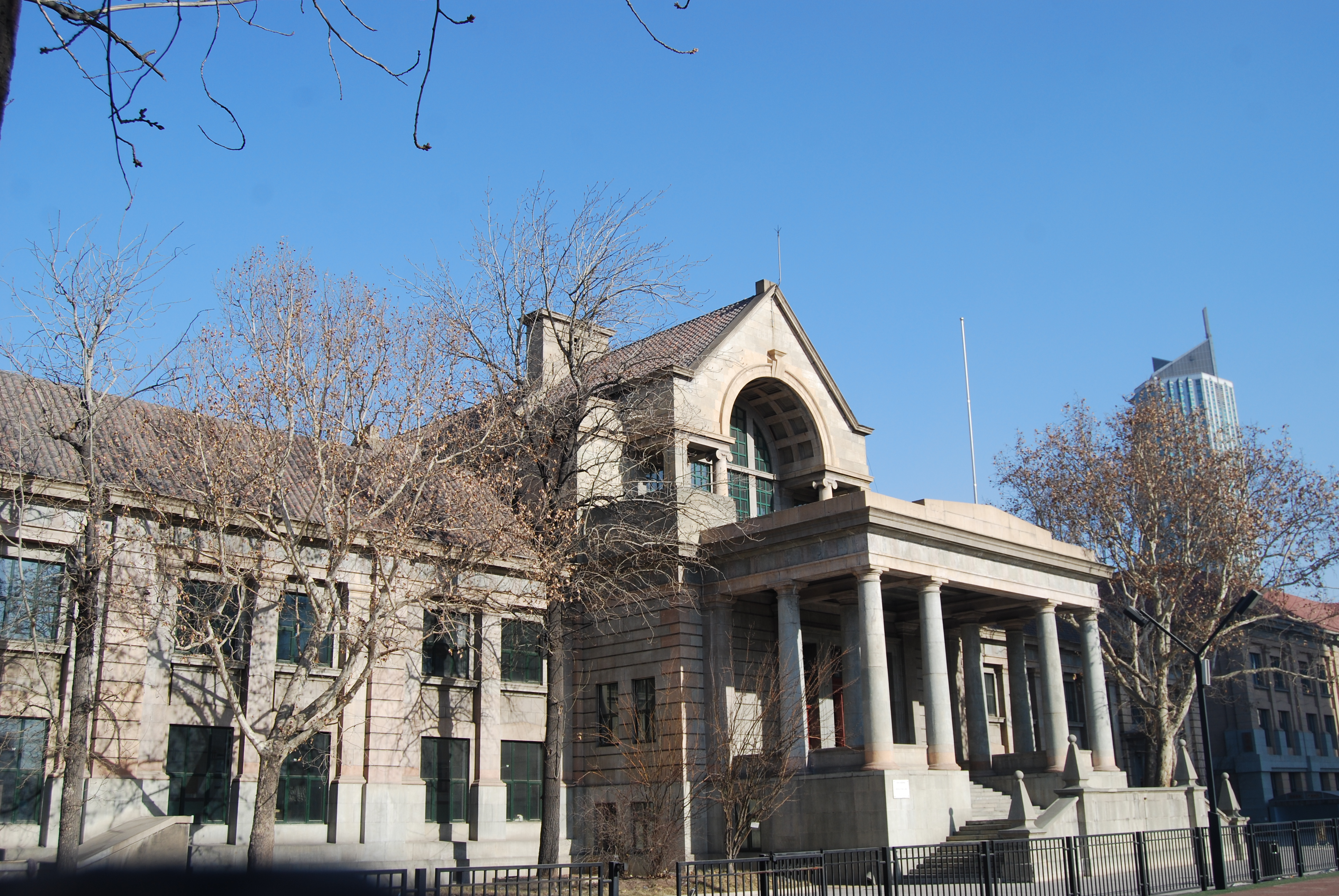
The current situation of the school buildings of Tianjin British Grammar School, which once held the Electoral Conference

Statistics of Annual and Special Meetings of Tianjin British Concession in Some Years
Time	Session	Venue	Attendance
1927.3.30	The 9th Annual Conference	Gordon Hall	Not recorded
1927.5.11	Special Conference	Gordon Hall	102
1928.4.11	The 10th Annual Conference	Gordon Hall	Not recorded
1929.4.17	The 11th Annual Conference	Gordon Hall	Not recorded
1930.4.16	The 12th Annual Conference	Gordon Hall	165
1931.4.15	The 13th Annual Conference	Gordon Hall	Not recorded
1932.4.20	The 14th Annual Conference	Gordon Hall	143
1933.4.12	The 15th Annual Conference	Gordon Hall	111
1934.4.11	The 16th Annual Conference	Gordon Hall	110
1935.4.10	The 17th Annual Conference	Gordon Hall	99
1936.4.15	The 18th Annual Conference	Gordon Hall、Yaohua High School	215
1936.12.9	Special Conference	Gordon Hall	79
1937.4.7	The 19th Annual Conference	Gordon Hall	153
1938.4.6	The 20th Annual Conference	Tientsin Grammar School	Not recorded
1938.12.2	Special Conference	Tientsin Grammar School	108
1939.4.21	The 21th Annual Conference	Tientsin Grammar School	179
1939.10.27	Special Conference	Tientsin Grammar School	77
1939.12.12	Special Conference	Tientsin Grammar School	71
1940.4.17	The 22th Annual Conference	Tientsin Grammar School	194
1940.8.14	Special Conference	Tientsin Grammar School	Not recorded
1940.12.18	Special Conference	Tientsin Grammar School	Not recorded
1941.4.16	The 23th Annual Conference	Tientsin Grammar School	Not recorded

== Related Item ==
- Board of the Tientsin British Municipal Council
- Tientsin British Municipal Council

== Related works ==
- Tianjin Municipal Archives Selected historical materials from the archives of the modern Tianjin Concession Tianjin: Tianjin People's Publishing House two thousand and twenty-two ISBN 978-7-201-12142-0
- Tianjin Municipal Archives Selected historical materials from the Tianjin British Concession Bureau of Works Tianjin: Tianjin Ancient Books Publishing House two thousand and thirteen ISBN 978-7-5528-0067-8
- Tianjin Archives, Department of Archives, Nankai University Branch Selected Archives of Tianjin Concession Tianjin: Tianjin People's Publishing House 1992–04. ISBN 978-7-201-00544-7
