= Natural disasters in China =

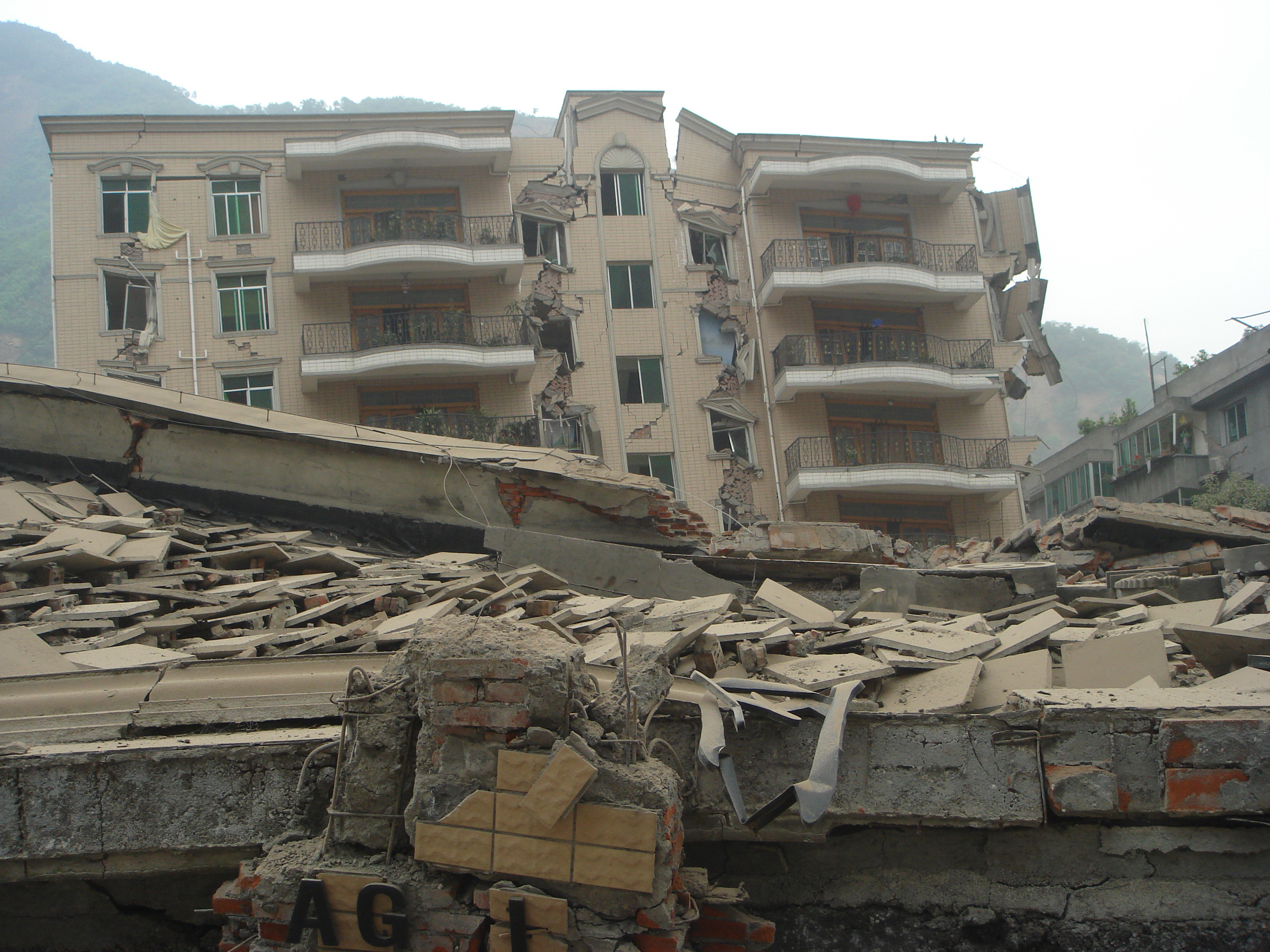
Aftermath of the 2008 Sichuan earthquake in Beichuan, Sichuan.

Natural disasters in China are the result of several different natural hazards that affect the country according to its particular geographic and geologic features affecting both humans and animals.

== Perception of disasters ==
Natural disasters reveal the traditional view of disasters as divine retribution: tian zai (天災), literally 'heavenly disaster'.

In ancient beliefs, natural disasters were seen as Heaven's response to immoral human behaviour, whereby the conduct of different individuals carried different weights. While the behaviour of common people ranked last, the actions of bureaucrats had a greater effect. Given that in Imperial China the emperor's behaviour was believed to be the most important, popular belief was that the emperor should attempt to prevent disasters by ensuring his conduct was in following with moral codes – and if a disaster should occur, he was responsible for addressing the consequences. According to the Overseas Development Institute, the state-led nature of humanitarian aid in today's China traces back to these traditional beliefs. Chinese believed that natural disasters would foretell the end of a dynasty or the death of a great leader.

This concept of cosmic linkage between natural disasters and human conduct was radically rejected at the height of Maoist years when nature was represented as ‘an enemy to be overcome, an adversary to be brought to heel’. Propaganda posters were produced with the slogan, "Earthquakes cannot frighten us, the people will certainly conquer nature."

== Types ==
=== Earthquakes ===
The People's Republic of China established a National Earthquake Administration in 1971 to take charge of monitoring, research, and emergency response for earthquakes. It was renamed China Earthquake Administration (CEA) in 1998, mandated by the Earthquake prevention and Disaster Reduction Act of PRC under the State Council. Each provincial, autonomous regional, and centrally administered municipal government also has its own earthquake administration that is under the direction of CEA.

=== Famine ===
Among the famines in China, the worst ever was the Great Chinese Famine.

=== Floods ===
Floods in China are a natural disaster that have occurred frequently throughout Chinese history. Flooding along the Yellow River has historically been the most severe, along with flooding of the Yangtze–Huai River basin. Flooding of the Pearl River has also occurred frequently in history. There are numerous Chinese flood myths.

China's steep geography and subtropical and tropical climates mean that large-scale thunderstorms and tropical storms happen frequently. Since many settlements are located along waterways, high volumes of water can easily overflow river banks and cause extensive damage. Compared to other countries, a 2016 study found that China has the most expensive impact of flooding annually. A 2021 estimate by Zero Carbon Analytics suggested that floods cost China USD 214 billion between 1996-2015.

With climate change, these costs are likely to continue to grow; for example, flooding caused $2.8 billion USD worth of damage in August 2025 and displaced as many as 10 million people. Zero Carbon Analytics projected USD 479 billion by 2035 under climate change scenarios.

== Emergency management ==
The National Disaster Reduction Center (NDRC) of the Ministry of Civil Affairs (MCA) is a specialized agency under the Chinese Government engaged in information services and supporting decisions on various natural disasters. It provides reference for disaster-management departments in their decision-making and technical support for China's disaster-reduction undertakings by way of collecting and analyzing disaster information, assessing disasters and emergency relief, and analyzing and studying disasters using such advanced technology as satellite remote sensing.

== See also ==
- Climate change in China
