= China floods =

China floods may refer to:

- Floodis in China
- Great Flood (China), ancient
