= 2024 Guangdong floods =

Natural disaster in China

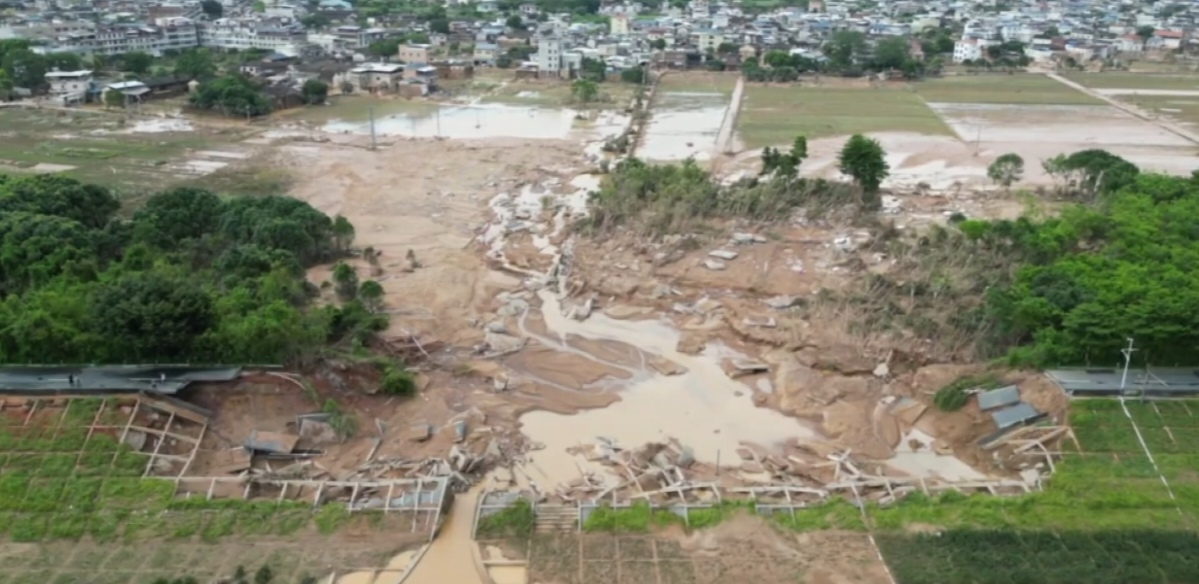
- Aerial photography of Jiaoling County, Meizhou after the flood (as of 19 June 2024)
- Date: 16 April 2024 – present
- Location: Guangdong, China
- Cause: Torrential rain
- Deaths: 52

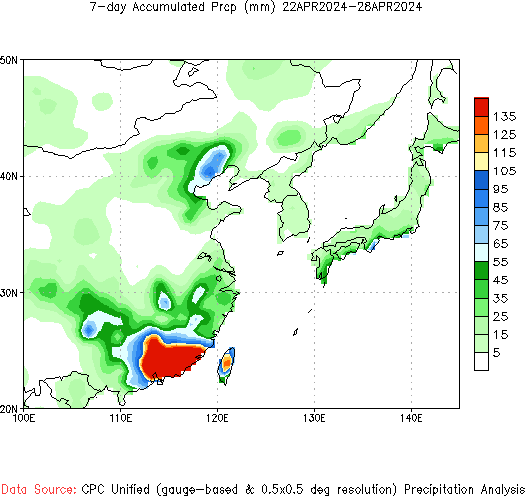
America NOAA 7 Day Rainfall Data for China Region(22 April 2024 to 28 April 2024)

In April 2024, heavy rains caused floods in China, mainly affecting Guangdong Province.

In Guangdong Province, at least four deaths were confirmed, while 10 people were missing. As many as 110,000 people were evacuated. Tens of millions of people were reported affected.

Landslides in Shaoguan caused by heavy downpours injured six people and damaged 80 homes. Losses were estimated to be around 140 million yuan. Waterlogged soil led to a highway collapse in Meizhou on 2 May, killing at least 48.
