= 1939 Tianjin flood =

Flood disaster that occurred in Tianjin, China in 1939

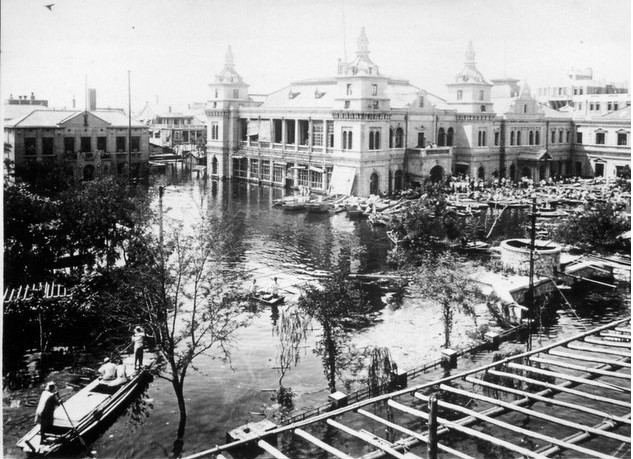
Public hall in the Japanese concession in Tianjin during the flood

The 1939 Tianjin flood was a major flood in China that occurred in Tianjin between August and October 1939. The disaster inundated approximately 80 percent of the city's urban area, destroyed more than 100,000 houses, and affected over eight million people, with about 650,000 residents in Tianjin and surrounding areas becoming homeless. The direct economic losses were estimated at 600 million Chinese National Currency.

== Cause ==
=== Natural causes ===
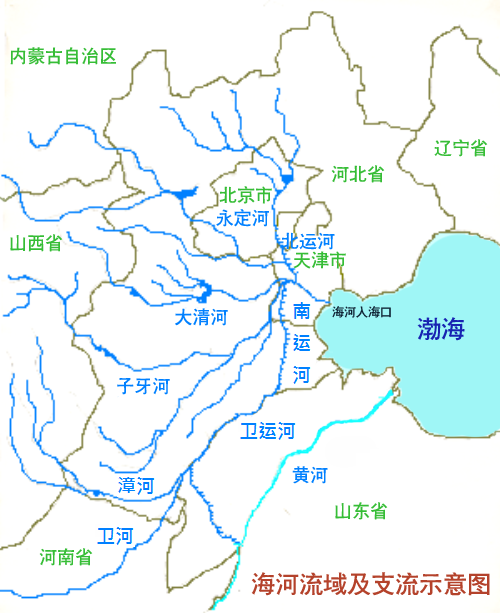
There are many tributaries in the upper reaches of the Haihe River, but the discharge capacity in the lower reaches is small. Tianjin is located in the lower reaches of the Haihe River Basin and is prone to flooding.

Tianjin is located on the North China Plain, which is bordered by the Taihang Mountains to the west and the Yan Mountains to the north. The windward slopes of these mountain ranges are prone to concentrated heavy rainfall. In addition, the region is characterized by steep terrain in the uplands and low-lying areas downstream, with relatively thin soil and limited vegetation cover, conditions that make it particularly susceptible to severe flooding.Tianjin is also situated in the lower reaches of the Hai River basin. The Hai River is a fan-shaped river system with limited discharge capacity, formed by the confluence of five major rivers—the Yongding River, North Canal, Daqing River, Ziya River, and South Canal—along with numerous tributaries. As a result, when the summer rainy season arrives in Tianjin and its surrounding areas, floodwaters tend to surge rapidly while draining poorly, making the region highly prone to widespread flooding.Historically, Tianjin has experienced frequent flood disasters. Between 1653 and 1939, major floods occurred in 1653, 1654, 1668, 1801, 1871, 1890, and 1917. Among these, the floods of 1917 and 1939 were particularly severe.

=== Human factor ===
In addition to the natural causes of the 1939 Tianjin flood, actions taken by the Japanese military also contributed significantly to the disaster. In an effort to weaken anti-Japanese resistance forces, Japanese troops deliberately breached river dikes, causing flooding and damaging flood-control infrastructure along the Hai River basin. At the time, Japanese forces destroyed 182 dikes along rivers including the Daqing River, Ziya River, Hutuo River, and Fuyang River(Hebei).

== Disaster situation ==
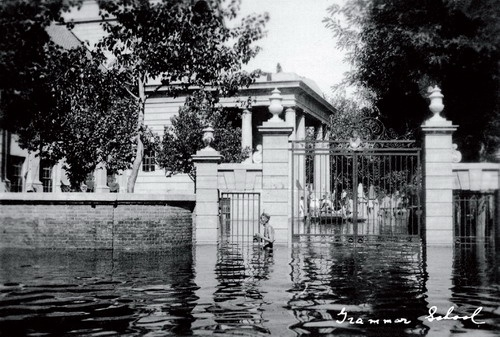
The British Grammar School in the British concession in Tianjin during the Flood

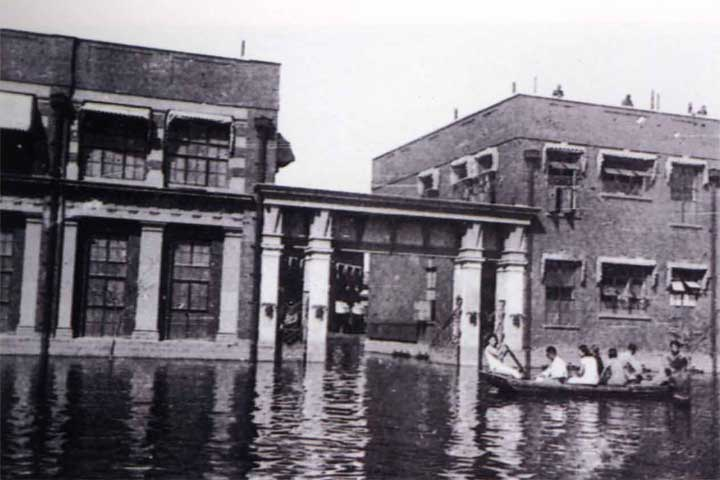
Yaohua School during the 1939 Flood

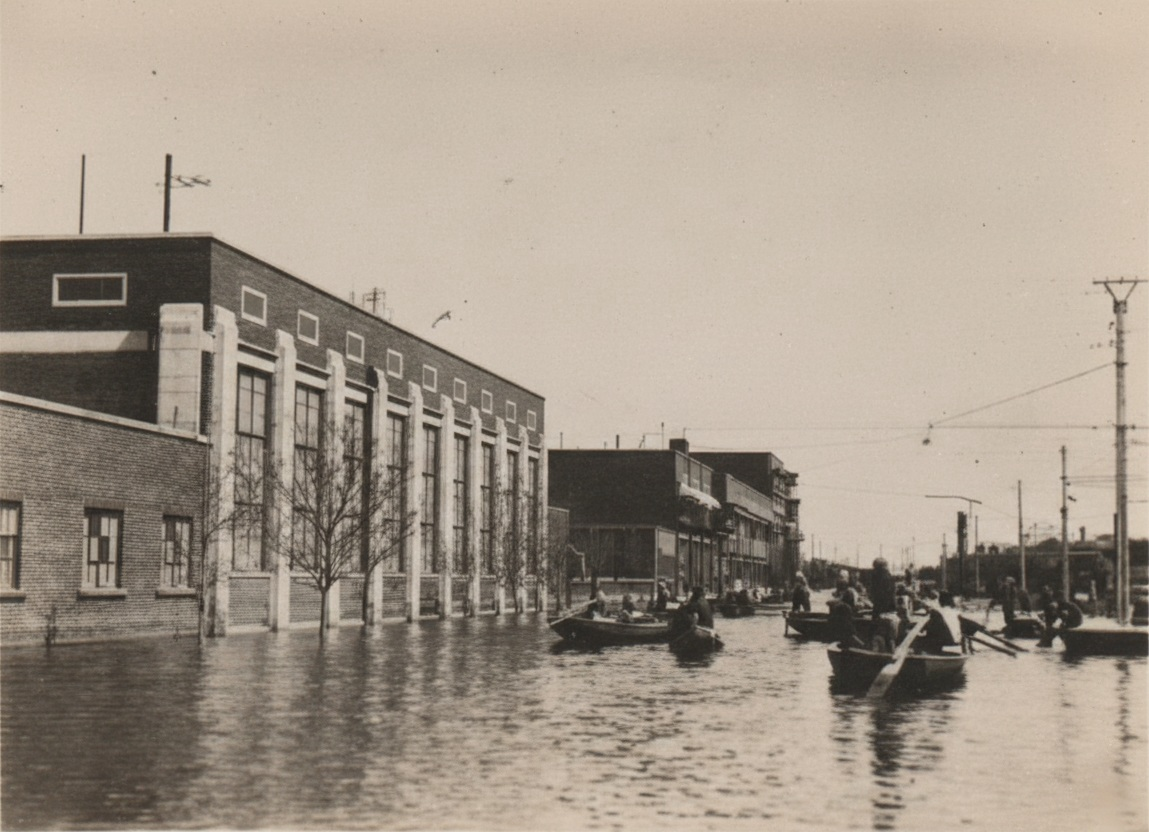
Yaohua School and Qiangzi River during the 1939 flood

In August 1939, widespread torrential rains fell across Northern China, causing water levels to surge in the upper reaches of the Hai River and in multiple waterways within Tianjin, with floodwaters merging into a vast inundation. On August 20, the Chentangzhuang embankment collapsed, turning areas south of the Hai River into a flooded expanse. On August 21, the floodwaters entered the urban area of Tianjin, submerging Xiaoliu Village, Qiande Village, and Tonglou in succession.Subsequently, approximately 80 percent of Tianjin's urban area was inundated, with most areas remaining waterlogged for as long as one and a half months. Land transportation, industry, and commerce in Tianjin were brought to the brink of paralysis, resulting in direct economic losses of about 600 million Chinese National Currency. Around 650,000 residents in Tianjin and its surrounding areas were displaced by the disaster.In early October 1939, the floodwaters receded. In the aftermath, epidemics such as Cholera, Typhoid fever, and Dysentery spread widely throughout Tianjin. Among the affected areas, five locations in Tianjin suffered particularly severe damage:

- First severely affected area: At around 3:00 p.m. on August 20, 1939, the Chentangzhuang embankment breached, making Xiaoliu Village, Tucheng, Donglou, Qiandezhuang, Tonglou, and surrounding areas the hardest hit.
- Second severely affected area: At around 5:00 p.m. on August 20, 1939, a breach occurred in the South Canal, and floodwaters spread to the Qiangzi River(Tianjin). Areas along the Hai River, including the British concession in Tianjin, French concession in Tianjin, and Japanese concession in Tianjin, became severely affected.
- Third severely affected area: At around 9:00 p.m. on August 20, 1939, floodwaters inundated the old city of Tianjin, making Nanshi, the southwestern corner near Guangkai, and surrounding areas severely affected.
- Fourth severely affected area: On August 29, 1939, a breach occurred at Fengjiakou on the Hai River, severely impacting areas such as Dazhigu, Dawangzhuang, Tangjiakou, Dongjuzi, Shenwangzhuang, and Guowangzhuang.
- Fifth severely affected area: On August 30, 1939, areas including Ligonglou, Fenglin, various villages in Hepu, and the southwestern district were among the most severely affected.

== Disaster resistance situation ==
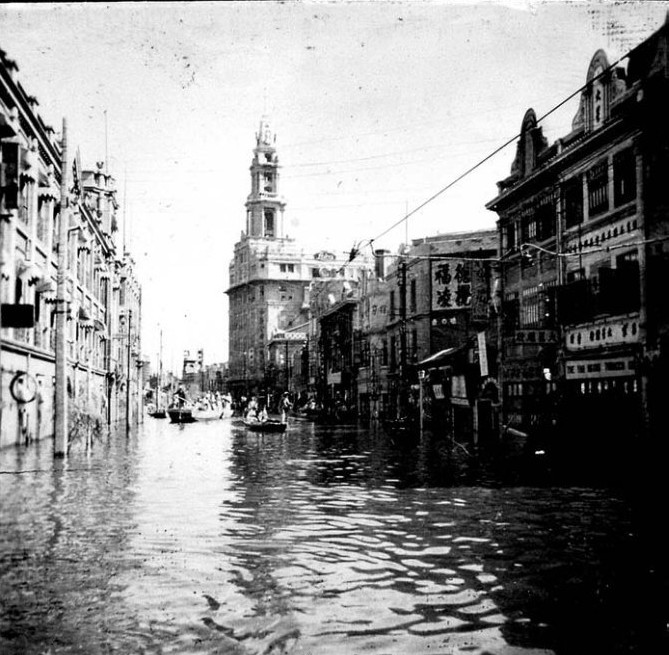
Xu Street in the Japanese concession in Tianjin during the Flood

On August 20, 1939, Masaharu Homma, commander of the Japanese garrison in Tianjin, proposed unifying the command system for flood control and relief operations. This proposal was accepted by the then mayor of Tianjin, Wen Shizhen, as well as by the authorities of the British concession in Tianjin and the French concession in Tianjin. Japan deployed the 27th Division, along with Chinese and Japanese personnel and members of the British and French garrisons, to repair embankments, drain floodwaters, and carry out epidemic prevention, rescue, and sanitation work.During the relief efforts, all available watercraft within Tianjin were mobilized to rescue flood victims. Residents of flooded single-story and low-rise buildings were relocated to safer areas. As large numbers of refugees from outside Tianjin poured into the city, the authorities organized efforts to evacuate victims to Beijing.On August 24, the Tianjin authorities established and enforced standard prices for food and other essential goods. On September 27, they promulgated the “Regulations on Loans for Flood Recovery Funds,” and on September 28 initiated citywide cleaning, disinfection, and inspection measures. By early October 1939, the floodwaters had receded.

== See also ==
- History of Floods in China
- The 1963 Haihe River Flood
- 2012 extremely heavy rainstorm in Tianjin
- History of Tianjin
