= 2021 Henan floods =

2021 floods in Henan, China

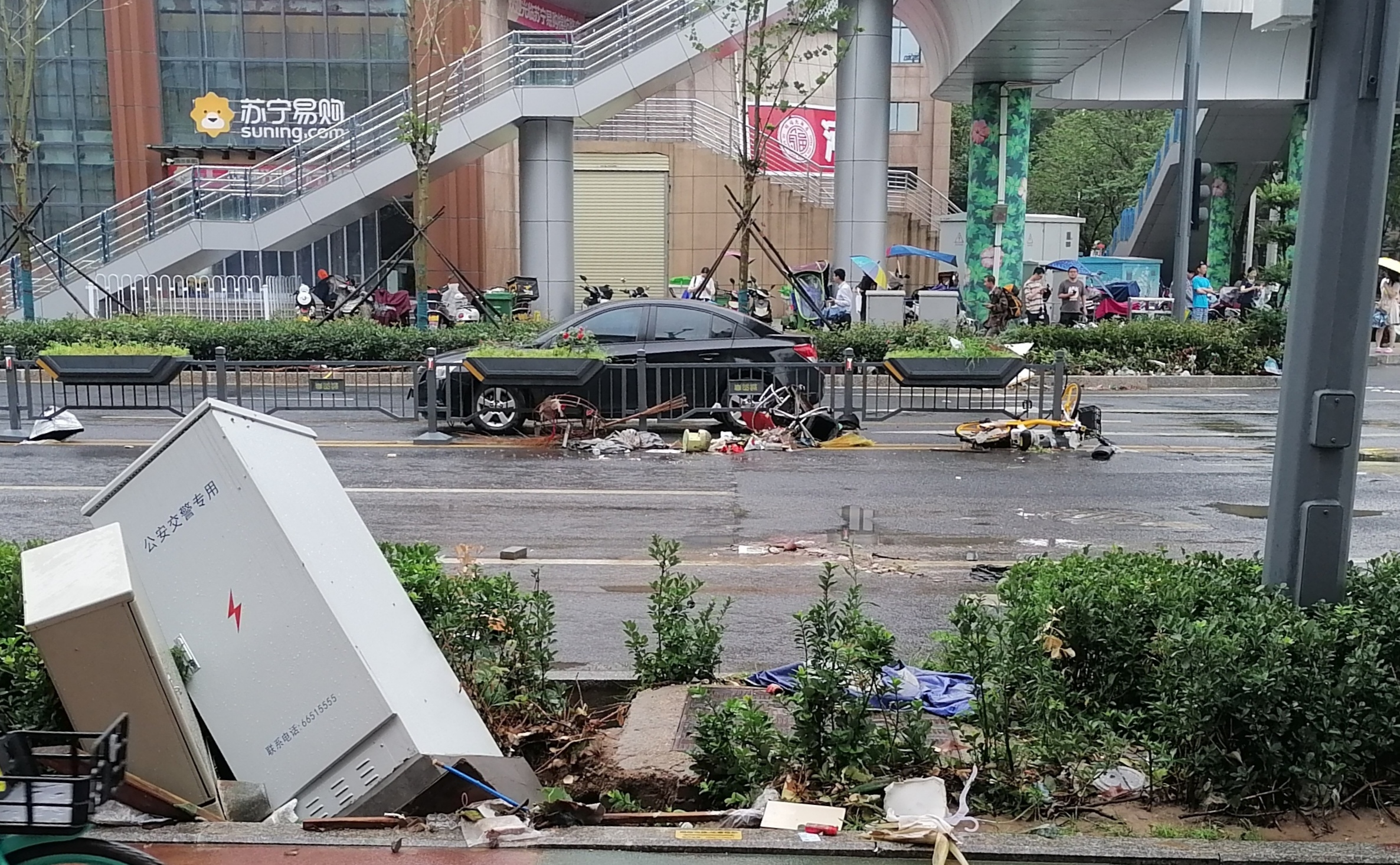
- Songshan Road in Zhengzhou, damaged by the floods.
- Date: 17 July 2021 – 31 July 2021
- Location: Henan, China (most affected) Hebei, Shanxi and Hubei (partially affected)
- Deaths: 302—398 (Note: In the source, the used expression 死亡失踪 means that the "398" toll refers to the total number of both the fatalities and the missing instead of clarifying the exact number of the missing people separately)
- Property damage: ~133 billion yuan (US$20.9 billion)

The 2021 Henan floods were floods in China, specifically the province of Henan, which experienced flooding between 17 and 31 July 2021 as a result of heavy rainfall. On 20 July, Zhengzhou, the provincial capital, recorded 201.9 millimetres (7.95 in) of rainfall within an hour, the highest ever figure recorded since measurements began in 1951. (Note: 201.9 millimetres (7.95 in) is a new hourly rainfall record in Zhengzhou since measurements were established. Many media outlets claimed the figure as being the highest in the country's history, although the claim is disputed as Xiachen (下陈), Henan recorded 218.1 millimetres (8.59 in) of rainfall during 1975 while Dashicao (大石槽), Shaanxi recorded 252 millimetres (9.9 in) of rainfall on 20 June 1981.) On 2 August 2021, provincial authorities reported 302 deaths (292 in Zhengzhou), and over 50 missing people. Later, government investigations led to conclude that provincial officials had “deliberately impeded and withheld reports of up to 139 cases”, and that the full death toll was 398. The floods caused the evacuation of 815,000 people, and affected 14.5 million people around the province. The intensity of the floods was believed to have been amplified by extreme weather caused by climate change.

== Meteorological synopsis ==
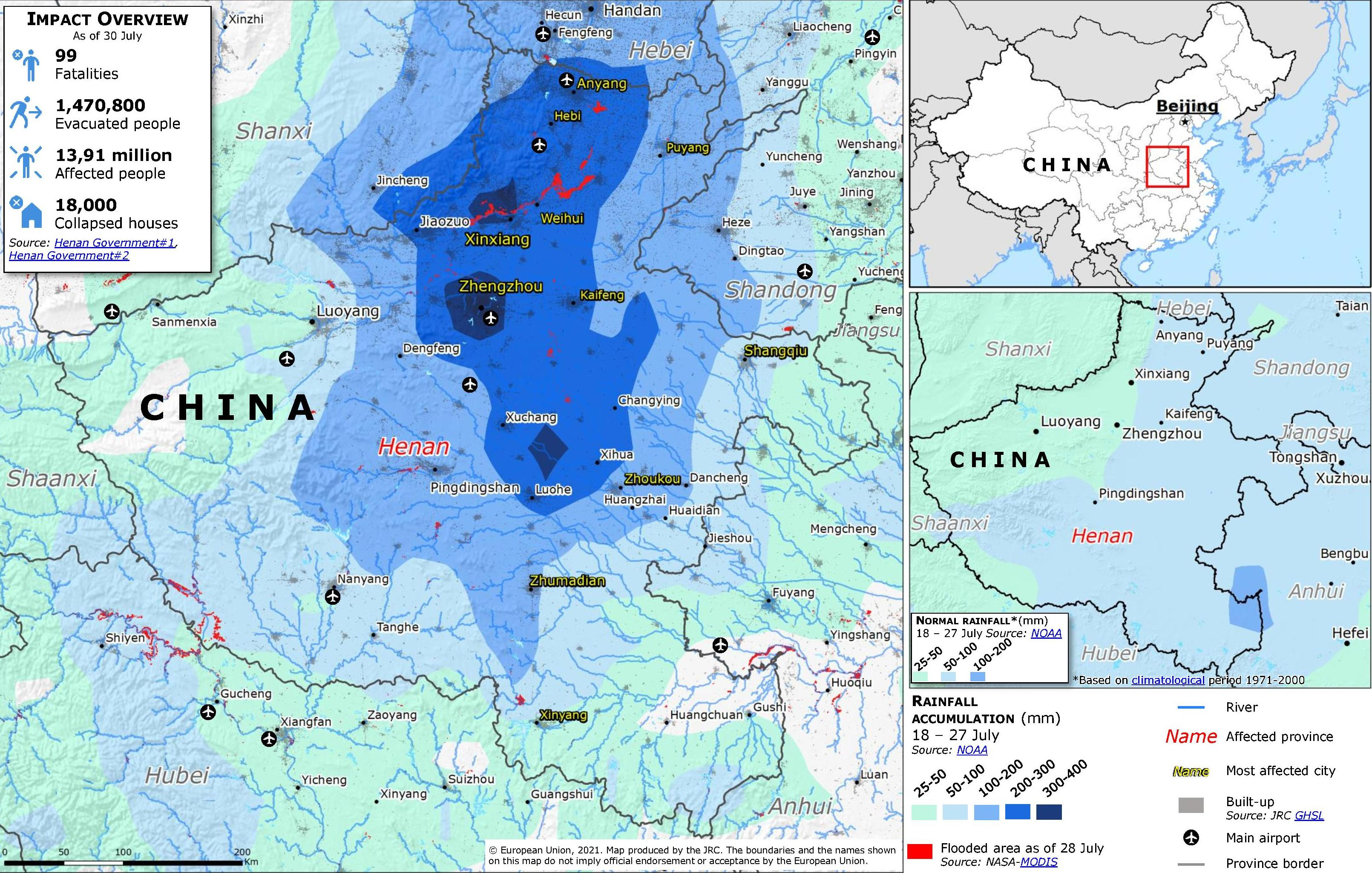
Map of the impacted area

Hourly rainfall in Zhengzhou, from 0:00 on 20 July to 12:00 on 21 July 2021

Several factors were attributed to the unusual and severe floods in Henan. The subtropical high (system of high atmospheric pressure) in the western Pacific as well as the continental high-pressure area in the Sea of Japan and inland Northwest China contributed to the continuous rainfall in the province. In addition, weak upper-level winds, normal for the summer in the region, made it so the storm barely moved locations.

Mesoscale convections were reported to be frequently moving over Zhengzhou, which cause intense thunderstorms. According to the China Meteorological Administration, the two main reasons for the storm were Typhoon In-fa, which occurred 1,000 kilometres (620 mi) from Henan, and the continuous subtropical high pressure that guided a large amount of water vapor to the land. The high pressure was affected by the Taihang Mountains and other topographical areas, causing heavy relief rain in the province.

== Impact ==
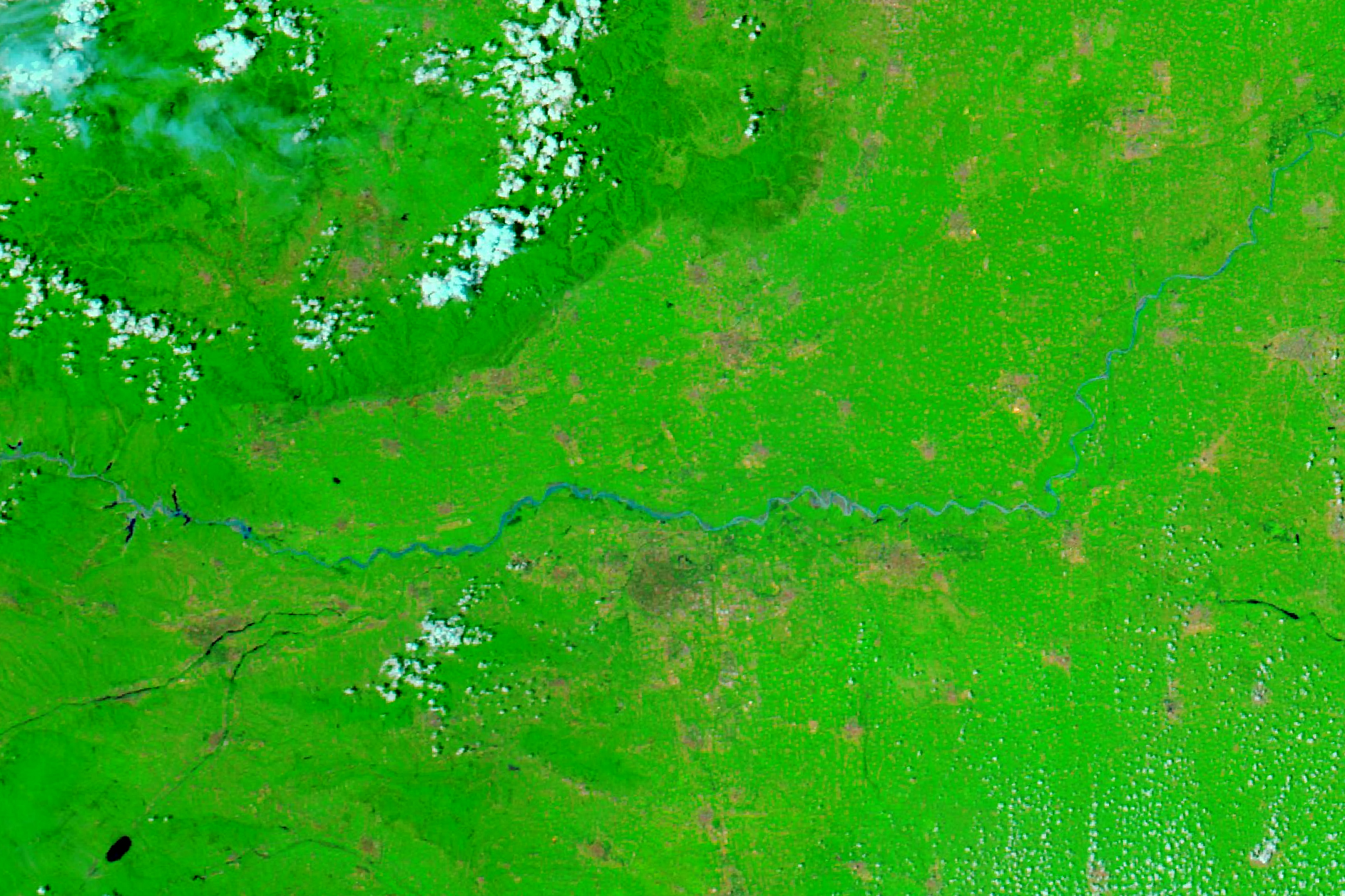
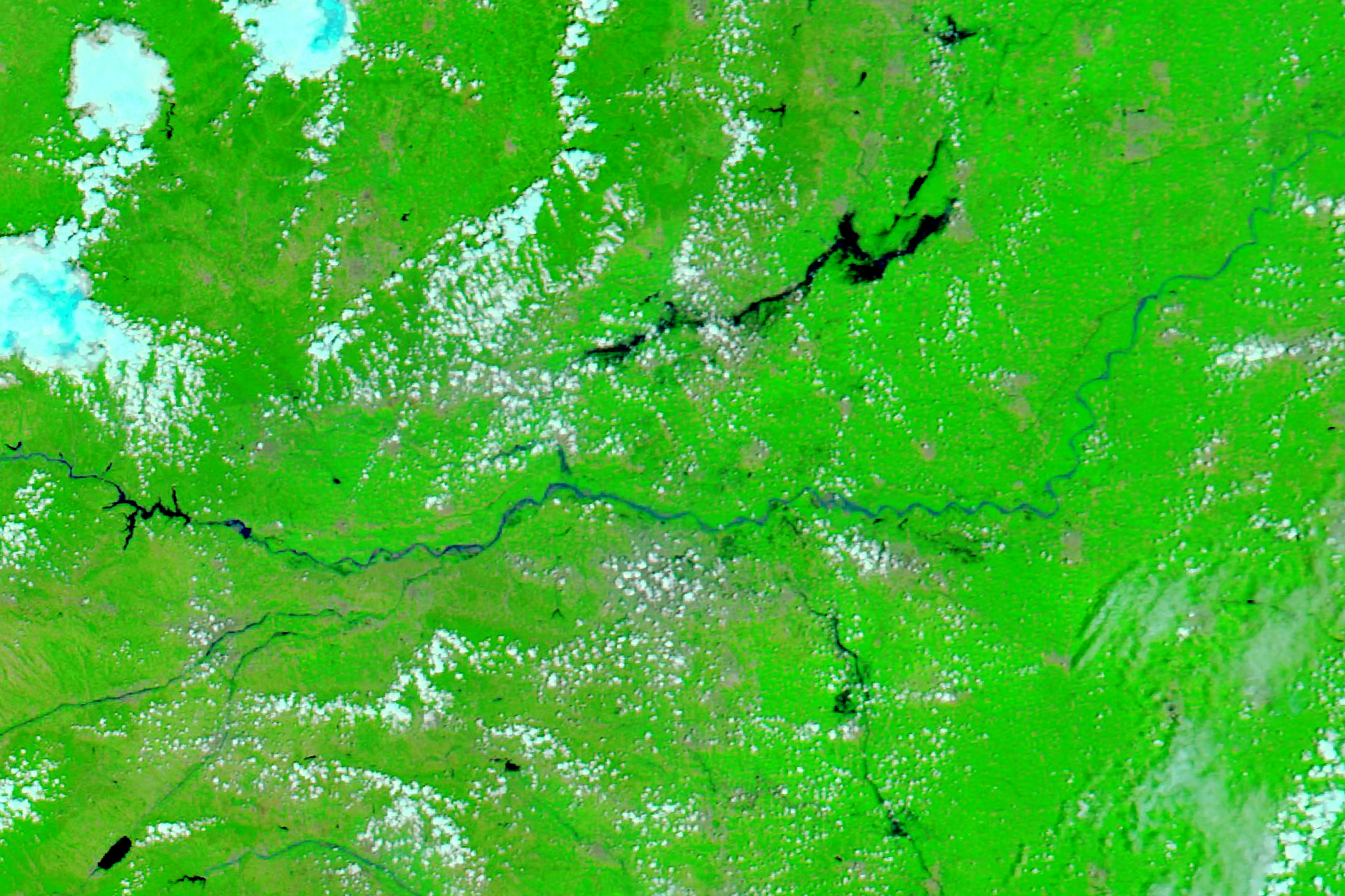
False color images by NASA's Aqua satellite showing the extent of flooding compared to the situation on 20 July 2021 (top).

From 8:00 on 19 July 2021 to 8:00 on 20 July, rainfall monitoring stations in Henan Province measured a large amount of rainfall. Five Chinese national monitoring stations measured the following: Songshan (364.6 mm/14.35 in), Xinmi (254.9 mm/10.03 in), Xinzheng (196 mm/7.72 in), Dengfeng (192.8 mm/7.59 in), and Yanshi (183.3 mm/7.22 in). Zhengzhou received abnormally heavy rainfall between 16:00 to 17:00 on the 20th. The rainfall in one hour was recorded as 201.9 mm (7.95 in), causing serious waterlogging. 13 reservoirs in Henan reached the flood control limit.

=== Zhengzhou ===
Video by CNS reporter who traveled on a CRH train, from Xingtai East station to Zhengzhou East station, on 21 July

Another CNS video report of the floods on 20 July, depicting Henan Province

Streets in Zhengzhou during the flood on 20 July, depicted by a China News Service (CNS) video report

On 16 July 2021, Zhengzhou began to experience heavy rain. On 20 July alone, the average precipitation was 253 mm (10.0 in). Between 16:00 to 17:00 on 20 July, the hourly rainfall reached 201.9 mm (7.95 in). Over the course of three days, between 20:00 on 17 July to 20:00 on 20 July, 617.1 mm (24.30 in) of rainfall was recorded, nearing the usual average yearly precipitation. Videos emerged, showing cars floating in streets and Zhengzhou Metro passengers waist-deep in water inside their carriage. Many cars on a road near the Danshi community in Longhu Town, Xinzheng were washed up by the rain. The Jingguang North Road Tunnel became flooded, trapping over 200 cars within. The Zhengzhou Meteorological Observatory issued a red warning signal for rainstorms, and the Zhengzhou Flood Control and the Drought Relief Headquarters upgraded the emergency response of flood control level II to level I. The hourly precipitation and single-day precipitation rates broke the historical record of 60 years from when records began in 1951. The Zhengzhou flooding raised concerns over whether the storm drain system offers sufficient drainage.

The flooding in Zhengzhou left 398 people dead or missing. According to insurance reports, over 400,000 cars in Zhengzhou were damaged by the floods, resulting in over RMB 6.4 billion in insurance claims.

=== Xinxiang ===
Xinxiang reportedly received the most precipitation, receiving over 260 mm (10 in) of rainfall in a 24-hour period. Xinzhong Avenue, a main road in Xinxiang, was flooded on 24 July. The road connecting Xinxiang and Weihui also became impassable. The worst hit area was Muye District, a partially rural district along the Wei River. Up to four days after the torrential rains, some rural areas remained inaccessible due to persistent flooding of access roads. By 26 July, the floods reached Weihui, where over a thousand people were evacuated from a hospital. A total of 204,000 people were relocated after severe flooding in Weihui.

Instead of the Yellow River flooding, as was expected as it has happened historically, the Communism Canal and Wei River on the west were the main cause of flooding.

=== Kaifeng ===
On the evening of 19 July, Kaifeng was affected by heavy rainfall. By the morning of 20 July, the heavy rain escalated to torrential rain. Kaifeng issued a red rainstorm warning accordingly, which was changed to an orange rainstorm warning on the afternoon of 20 July.

=== Rest of Henan ===
Heavy flooding was reported elsewhere in Henan. The Ying River, the province's largest river, overflowed causing flooding in its surrounding areas. In Dengfeng, which also experienced flooding, an aluminum alloy factory owned by Dengfeng Power Group exploded, but no deaths were reported. The military was sent to protect Yihetan Dam. In Hebi, the Wei River flooded several villages.

== Casualties ==
302 people died from the floods and 50 were declared missing. 14 people died from the flooding of Zhengzhou Metro's Line 5 in Zhengzhou on 20 July. Six bodies were recovered from the flooded Jingguang North Tunnel.

In Gongyi, four people died, and floodwater forced more than 20,000 people to abandon their homes.

== Aftermath ==
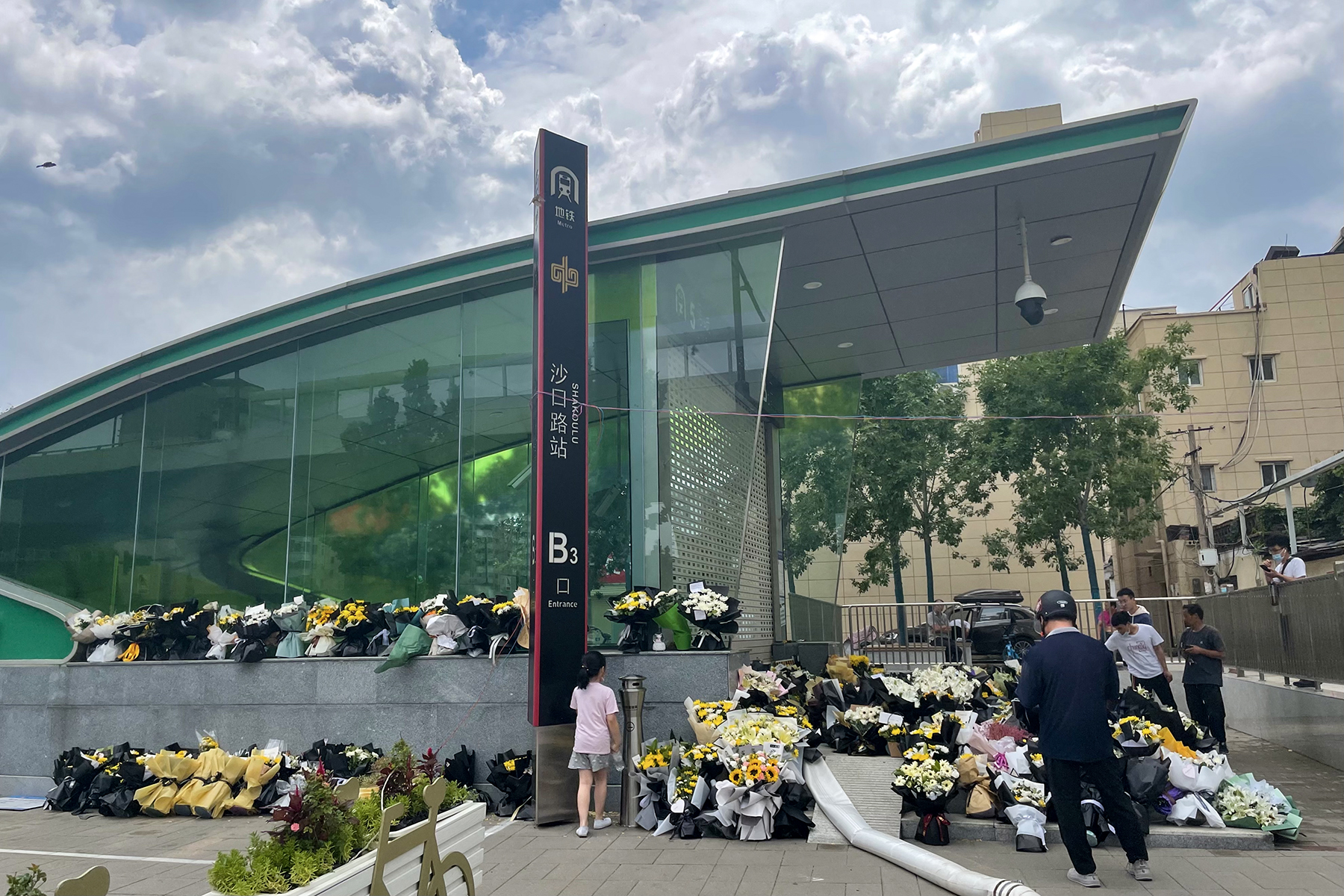
Mourning for the victims in the flood at Shakoulu Station, Line 5

Chinese Premier Li Keqiang called for all-out efforts during rescue and relief operations and stressed that ensuring people's lives and safety is a top priority. Local authorities were tasked with improving the province's flood controls and emergency preparedness. A number of politicians in China and abroad expressed condolences for the loss of life.

As of 21 July 2021, several Chinese companies donated a total of RMB 2 billion towards disaster relief funds. Through Alipay's donation platform, 3.36 million people raised a total of RMB 100 million of donations. Another 33 million was raised through a Weibo donation channel. According to the Henan Charity Federation, a total of RMB 2.664 billion in donations was raised as of 23 July.

All bus lines in Zhengzhou were made free of charge between 28 July and 28 August 2021 in order to reduce congestion, partially caused by the suspension of metro lines.

An official investigation on the flood in Zhengzhou was released by the investigation group from the State Council on 21 January 2022. It revealed officials in the province had deliberately underreported at least 139 deaths from the flooding. The death toll was revised to 398. By 23 January, 8 executives, mainly from local municipal construction companies, were arrested by police on several charges. 89 party and local officials were disciplined, including 3 facing prosecution.

== See also ==
- List of floods
- 2021 China floods
