= 2012 China floods =

The 2012 China floods were a series of floods late spring of 2012 and continued during the summer. They have caused high human and economic losses.

Since early May 2012, China was affected by torrential rains. In Gansu, Hunan, Guizhou, Guangxi, Jiangxi, Zhejiang, Fujian and Guangdong provinces, they resulted in rivers breaking their banks and multiple landslides. By June 10, 2012, 5.89 million people have been affected and the estimate of the direct economic loss was CNY¥ 15.03 billion (around US$2.38 billion).

In July, the areas of southwestern China, including Guangxi Zhuang Autonomous Region, and northeastern China including Beijing, Hubei and Liaoning were worst-affected.

The July 2012 Beijing flood was the result of the rainfall heaviest in 60 years. The Beijing disaster prompted China to invest billions of dollars in protection against rainfalls, and Xi Jinping called for building "cities like sponges."

== See also ==
- 2012 Pacific typhoon season
