= Shalan Town flood of 2005 =

Natural disaster in Heilongjiang, China

The Shalan Town Flood of 2005 was a severe flood which occurred in Shalan Town in the afternoon on 10 June 2005. A severe flood and mudslide took place in Shalan Town located in Ning'an, which was in Mudanjiang area in Heilongjiang Province, a province in the People's Republic of China. Shalan Town Central Primary School was submerged by floodwater, killing 117 people, 105 of which were students.
