= 1954 Yangtze floods =

Natural disasters in China

From June to September 1954, the 1954 Yangtze floods were a series of catastrophic floods in China that occurred mostly in Hubei Province. Due to unusually high volume of precipitation as well as an extraordinarily long rainy season in the middle stretch of the Yangtze River late in the spring of 1954, the river started to rise above its usual level in around late June. Despite efforts to open three important flood gates to alleviate the rising water by diverting it, the flood level continued to rise until it hit the historic high of 44.67 m (146.6 ft) in Jingzhou, Hubei and 29.73 m (97.5 ft) in Wuhan. The number of dead from this flood was estimated at around 33,000, including those who died of plague in the aftermath of the disaster.

== Aftermath ==
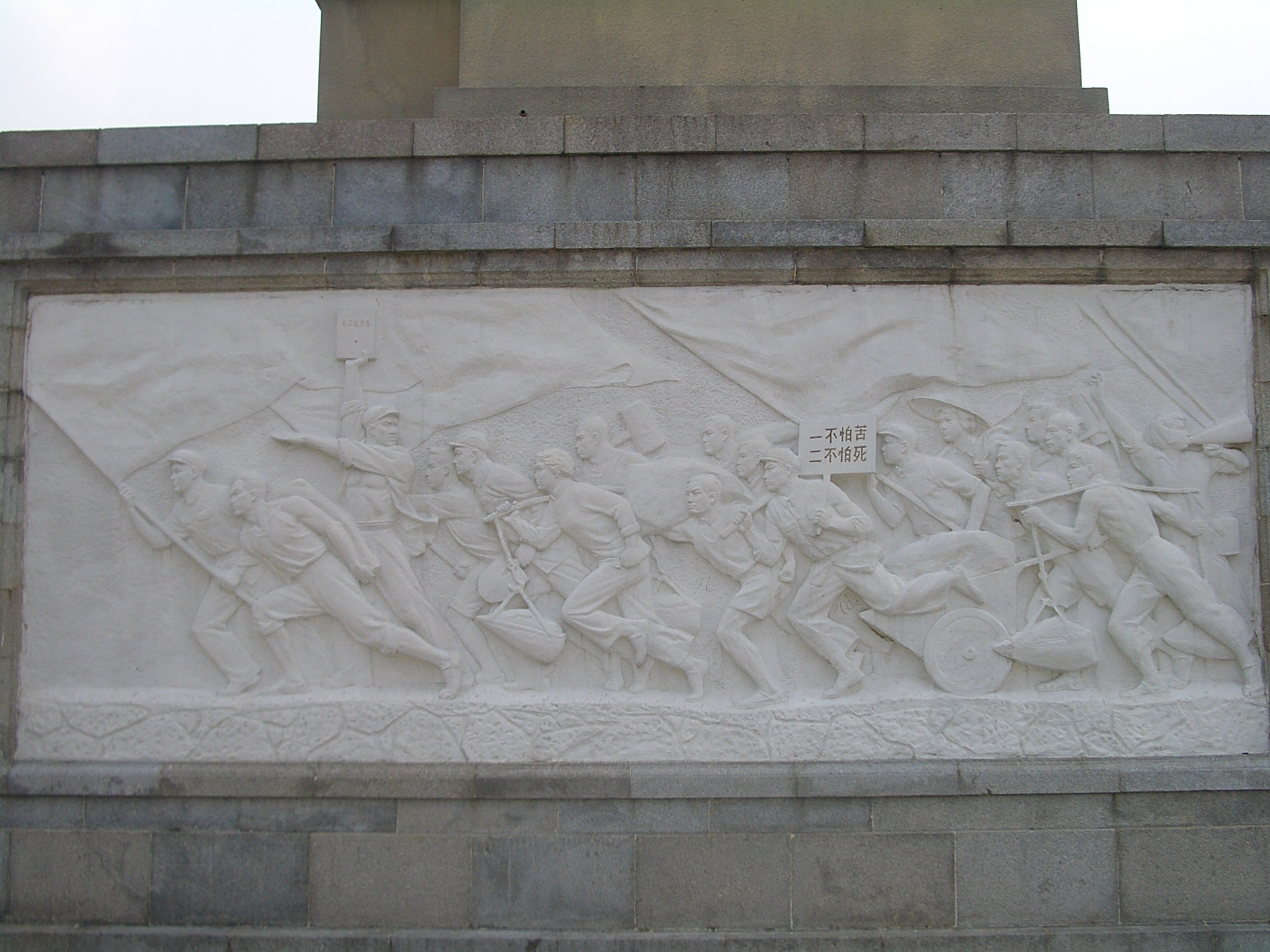
People of Wuhan fighting the flood, as depicted on the monument in Hankou. The text on the placard they carry, "一不怕苦，二不怕死" ("First, don't fear hardships; second, don't fear death") is said to be a Chinese Red Army's saying from the times of the Chinese Civil War; it was used by Mao Zedong in an April 1969 speech.

Communist Party officials came to the affected areas to assess the damage and begin salvage and rescue attempts. They reported that local residents refused to help build dams and ditches, instead going to temples to pray and responding that the flood had been pre-ordained and could not have been averted. This experience influenced the Chinese Communist Party's view that there was a problem of fatalistic and superstitious thinking among the Chinese people.

Partly as a result of this flood and the pressure to build new dams, the Gezhouba Dam and the Three Gorges Dam, in the upper reach of Yangtze river, gained considerable momentum. These dams have since proven their effectiveness in minimizing the impact of flooding events, such as with heavy downpours in 2010.

== Commemoration ==
In 1969, a large stone monument was erected in the riverside park in Hankou (City of Wuhan, Hubei) honoring the heroic deeds in fighting the 1954 flood. Among the carvings on the monument is a calligraphic inscription by Mao Zedong, dedicated to the people of Wuhan:

We must still be prepared to do battle against and overcome similarly severe floods that may occur in the future.

Below, is his poem "Swimming" (1956), envisioning future bridge and dam construction on the Yangtze:

I have just drunk the waters of Changsha
And come to eat the fish of Wuchang.
Now I am swimming across the great Yangtze,
Looking afar to the open sky of Chu.
Let the wind blow and waves beat,
Better far than idly strolling in a courtyard.
Today I am at ease.
"It was by a stream that the Master said -
"Thus so things flow away!""
Sails move with the wind.
Tortoise and Snake are still.
Great plans are afoot:
A bridge will fly to span the north and south,
Turning a deep chasm into a thoroughfare;
Walls of stone will stand upstream to the west
To hold back Wushan's clouds and rain
Till a smooth lake rises in the narrow gorges
The mountain goddess if she is still there
Will marvel at a world so changed."

On the sides of the monument's pedestal are reliefs depicting heroic people of Wuhan fighting the flood, raising banners and placards with quotations from Mao Zedong.

== Comparison ==
Compared to the 1998 Yangtze River Floods, this flooding was more severe in terms of total flow of water, but less in terms of the highest level that the flood water reached. This is probably a result of the intense logging on the banks of the upper reach of Yangtze River during the later part of the 20th century.
