= 2021 China floods =

Floods in China in 2021

- Date: 2021
- Location: China
- Type: flooding
- Deaths: 449
- Injuries: unknown

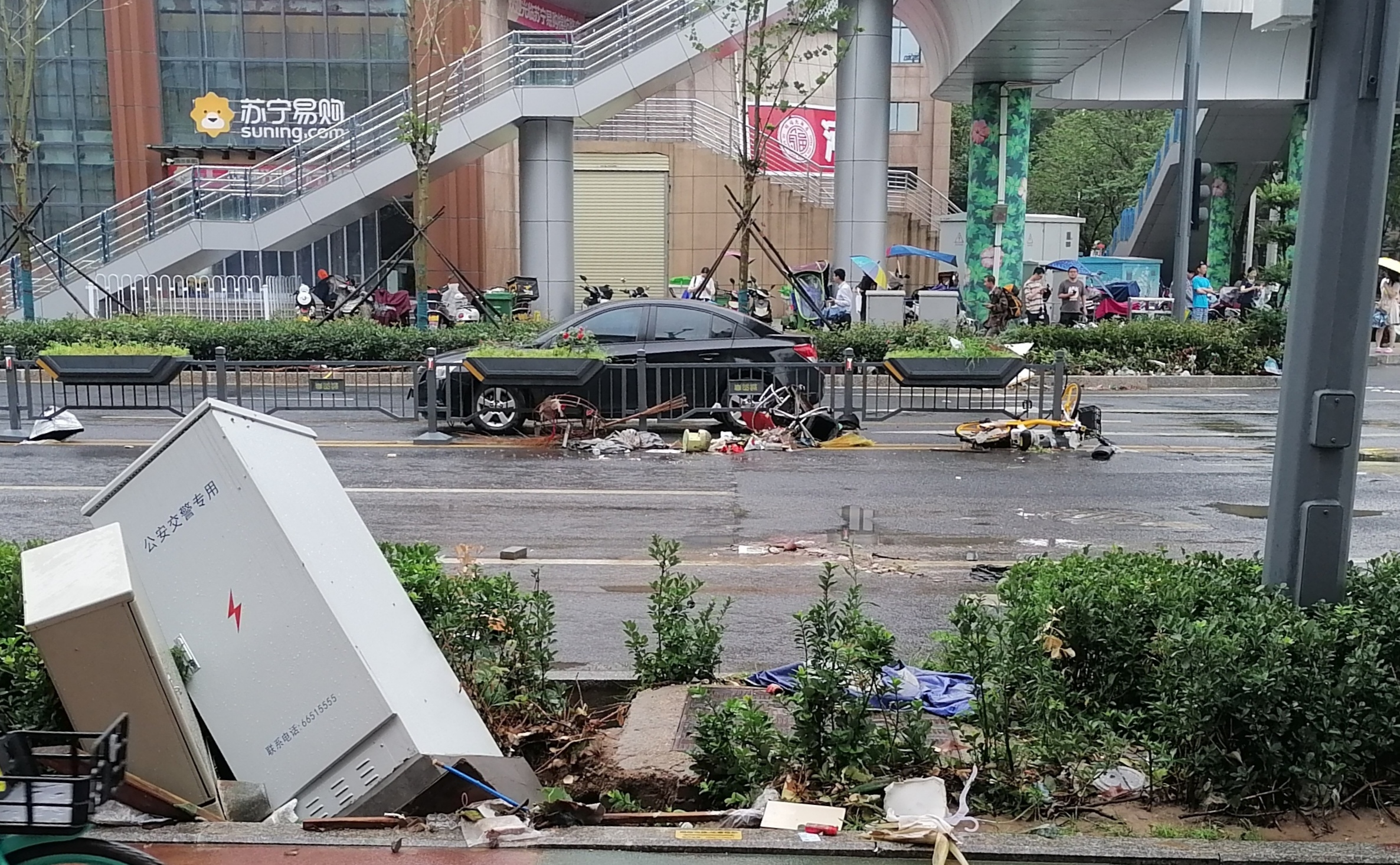
The damaged Songshan North Road of Zhengzhou after 2021 Henan floods

There were several floods in China starting in June 2021, most of them caused by heavy rainfall in different areas. According to the World Meteorological Organization, such heavy rains are frequently a result of climate change. The most notable floods were the 2021 Henan floods, which left 398 dead or missing.

== Heilongjiang ==
Since mid-June, water levels of Heilongjiang and Nenjiang rivers had been rising. Heilongjiang river, also known as the Amur across the border in Russia, also flooded Russia's Amur Oblast.

As of 26 June, over 19,000 people had evacuated and 42,000 people were affected by the flooding in Daxinganling, Heihe and Mudanjiang. Thousands of hectares of crops were damaged.

== Chongqing ==
Heavy rainfall was reported on 28 June 2021 in Chongqing municipality, forcing authorities to activate an emergency response system.

From 26 to 28 August, heavy rains and floods affected Qijiang District and Hechuan District, destroying 105 houses.

== Guizhou ==
Heavy rains causing floods led to the evacuation of 26,000 people and damaged 19,300 houses in Guizhou around 14 July 2021.

== Sichuan ==
In July 2021, floods affected more than 220,000 people and caused an estimated 176 million yuan (US$27 million) in damage. In Dazhou, thousands of people were evacuated due to floods and landslides. In Bazhong, 27,000 homes were reported to be without power.

On August 9, heavy rain in Sichuan forced the evacuation of 80,000 people.

== Shanxi and Hebei ==
On 12 July 2021, floods affected the Mount Wutai area in Xinzhou, resulting in one person dying. The city of Jincheng raised its heavy rain signal to the highest level.

From 2 to 8 October 2021, flooding in the province forced 120,000 people to be displaced and 60 coal mines to suspend operations. Landslides and floodings killed at least 15 people in the affected areas, including Taiyuan and the counties of Jincheng and Linfen. A dyke breached in a section of Fenhe River, a major tributary of the Yellow River, in Yuncheng. In Pingshan county of neighboring Hebei, 14 people were killed when a bus plunged into Hutuo river from a submerged road amid heavy flooding.

== Inner Mongolia ==
On July 19, two dams collapsed near the city of Hulunbuir, destroying bridges and farmlands. The Ministry of Water Resources said 87 millimetres (3.4 in) of rain had fallen on average in Hulunbuir over the weekend.

== Henan ==
Since 17 July 2021, Henan was affected by severe flooding, causing by record-breaking rainfall. Zhengzhou and other cities were hit by severe floods leaving 398 people dead or missing.

== Shaanxi ==
From 22 to 23 July 2021, heavy rains triggered floods in Luonan County, forcing the evacuation of more than 58,000 people.

Since 28 August, heavy rains caused flooding in parts of Shaanxi, affecting 74 counties. In Ankang, over 23,800 people had to be relocated.

== Typhoon In-fa ==
From July 25 to 26, rainfall and storm surge caused by Typhoon In-fa resulted in flooding in Shanghai and Jiangsu. The floods caused severe disruptions in rail, air, and shipping transportation.

== Hubei ==
Five cities in Hubei, including Suizhou, Xiangyang and Xiaogan, declared red alerts after torrential rain forced the evacuation of nearly 6,000 people. Yicheng received record rainfall. In Liulin township of Suizhou, 21 people were killed.

== See also ==
- 2021 European floods
- Climate change in China
