= Flooding of the Pearl River =

Flooding in southern China

Pearl River Zhujiang
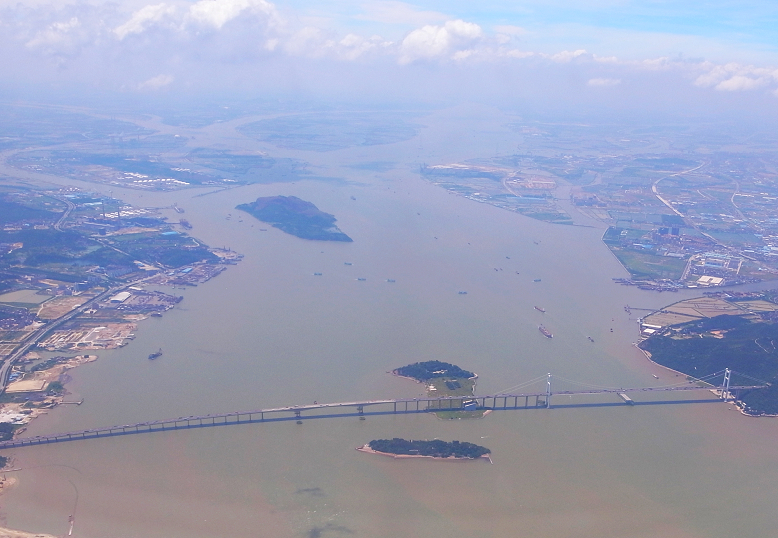
- Pearl River in Humen near Humen Town

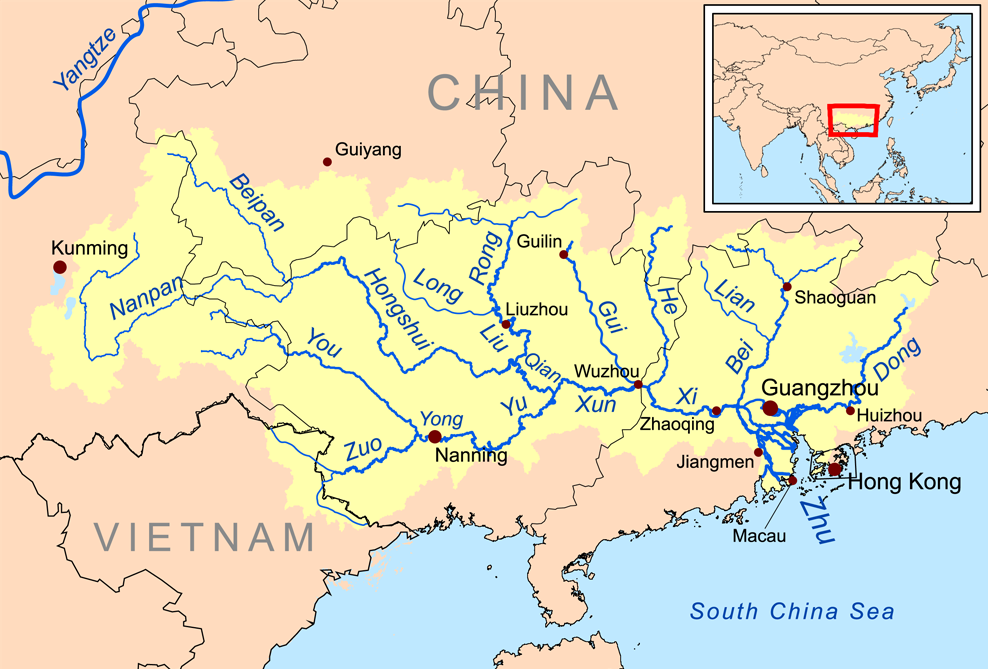
- The course of the Pearl River system through China and Vietnam

Location
- Country: China, Vietnam
- Provinces: Guangdong, Guangxi, Guizhou, Yunnan, Hunan, Jiangxi, Fujian

Physical characteristics
- Length: 2,400 km (1,500 mi)
- Basin size: 453,700 km^{2} (175,200 sq mi)
- Discharge
  - average: 9,500 m^{3}/s (340,000 cu ft/s)

The Pearl River (or Zhujiang) Basin is one of China's largest river basins, located in South China within total area approximately 453,700 square kilometers in Guangdong, Guangxi, Guizhou, Yunnan, Hunan, Jiangxi and Fujian provinces, and part of Northeastern Vietnam.

The Pearl River basin consists of three main tributaries: the Xi River, Bei River, and Dong River, and many small rivers within the Pearl River Delta. The Xi River is the largest tributary within total length of 2,214 kilometers, and the average slope of the river is 0.58%. The Bei River with a total length of 468 kilometers has the average slope of the river is 0.26%. The Dong water system has the main stream 520 kilometers long with the average slope of the river is 0.388%. Total annual water volume of the whole basin is 345.8 billion cubic meters, which is the second only to the Yangtze River in China.

The floods in the Pearl River are mainly caused by heavy rains. Since the area of the river basin is wide and the intensity of heavy rain is high, the floods in the alpine hilly areas of the upper and middle reaches are fast, and there are no lakes in the middle reaches. Therefore, in the case of continuous heavy rain, the floods are often formed with high peaks and large quantities in long duration, endangering the middle and lower reaches in the cities and towns with low land and large population, and vast farmland along the river, which restricts economic development and affects social stability.

== Flood characteristics ==
The Pearl River belongs to the rain-fall river and the flood comes from heavy rain. The causes of heavy rain are:

=== Atmospheric circulation ===
Since the heavy rain is affected by the subtropical monsoon, and the cold and warm groups are in harmony. Also, it is affected by the topography, resulted in frontal type of heavy rain, which usually occurs in April to July, named the first flood season.

=== Typhoons ===
The heavy rain is also affected by the typhoon, which usually occurs in August to September, called the later flood season. Rainfall in flood season accounts for about 80% of the whole year. Its characteristics are: a large amount of rainfall, a large intensity and a long duration. The regular pattern rule: Bei River first, then Dong River and Xi River. The rainstorm center: Bei River is in the area from Yingde to Qingyuan, Dong River is in the area of Jiulian Mountain, Xunwu and Shangping, while Xi River is in the Miao Mountain in the upper reaches of the Gui River, the Xingren in Laowang Mountain and Duan in Daming Mountain. The torrential rainstorms at the edge of the basin includes the city of Haifeng to Huidong in the east of Guangdong, Enping to Yangjiang in the west of Guangdong, and Qinzhou to Dongxing in southern Guangxi.

The maximum average annual rainfall of 24h in the basin is 100-200mm, the coefficient of variation is 0.35~0.65, and the maximum annual rainfall of 24h is 848mm (Jinjiang Encheng Station). The annual variation of runoff in the basin corresponds to the rainfall, that the water volume in the flood season from April to September accounts for 70% to 80% of the total annual water. Since the large amount of rainfall and high intensity during the flood season, many tributaries are fan-shaped, and floods are easy to collect into the main stream at the same time. There are many hills in the upper and middle reaches, and the flood convergence speed is relatively fast. There is no lake storage in the middle reaches, which it is easy to form floods with high peaks and large quantities. The biggest flood peaks in Bei River and Dong River often appear from May to June, and a flood lasts about 7 to 15 days. The largest flood peak in the Xi River often appears from June to August, while the largest floods mostly occur from June to July, lasting for 30 to 45 days. The Xi flood is the main source of floods in the Pearl River Delta. Sometimes the floods of Xi River and Bei River cause serious disasters in the Pearl River Delta.

Every year the typhoon season is from May to October. Typhoon land from Shenzhen, Guangdong, to the Pearl River Estuary in Taishan. A typhoon with a wind level of 8 or above in the center occurs on an average of 2 to 3 times per year, and a strong typhoon of 10 to 11 levels every 2 to 3 years. The invasion of the typhoon, sometimes results in even higher storm surges.

== Flood disasters ==
Floods in the Pearl River Basin are frequent, especially in the middle reaches, lower reaches and deltas. Historical literature had described many such floods. According to statistics, the floods occurred 125 times in the Ming dynasty in the Xi River Basin, 181 times in the Qing Dynasty, and 17 times in the Republic of China. There were 24 floods occurred in the Bei River Basin before 1949 and 14 major floods in the Dong River Basin from 1864 to 1985. In the lower reaches of the Pearl River and in the delta, more than 32,200 hectares of floods were affected or affected by arable land. There were 26 times in the 18th century and 36 times in the 19th century. From 1915 to 1949, there were 22 times of arable land flooding area exceeding 66,700 hectares. There have been 12 heavy floods since the 1949. After the 1990s, the "94.6", "96.7" and "98.6" floods occurred, which the damages were very serious.

== Typical flood ==
In July 1949, the typical floods encountered in the Xi River Flood and the Bei River. The flood was a basin flood of the Xi River caused by heavy rain formed by the front shear weather system. The flood mainly comes from the Lancang River and the Liujiang River had the largest proportion. The flood peak flow of the Wuzhou station is 48,900 cubic meters per second, which was equivalent to a 50-year flood. It is a single-peak type with a flow rate of over 30,000 cubic meters per second. After 18 days, the 30-day flood was 88.4 billion cubic meters, which was the first in the series of the largest 30-day flood.

In June 1959, Dong River basin flood caused by heavy rain formed by frontal shear weather system. The flood mainly comes from Boluo. The Boluo station has a measured peak flow of 12,800 cubic meters per second and a reduction value of 14,100 cubic meters per second, which is equivalent to a flood in 100 years.

In June 1994, there were 13 consecutive rains in South China. The Xi River and the Bei River were concurrently in the 50th year. When the two rivers flooded, they entered the Pearl River Delta network. The water level in the delta rose sharply, and the high water level lasted for a long time. More than 10 days. The flood disaster affected 70 cities (counties) in Guangxi and 39 cities (counties) in Guangdong, resulting in nearly 1.25 million hm² of affected farmland in Guangdong and Guangxi. The affected population reached 21.48 million, with 446 deaths and direct economic losses of about 28.4 billion yuan.

In July 1996, heavy rains occurred in the southeastern Yunnan and central Guangxi areas of the Pearl River Basin. The rainstorm centre was in the old area of Bei River. From July 12 to 19, the rainfall reached 1,692 mm, and the maximum rainfall of 779 mm in 24 hours was Guangxi. The highest record of the Zhuang Autonomous Region. At 20 o'clock on the 19th, Liuzhou Station showed a peak water level of 92.43m, exceeding the warning water level of 10.93m, and the flood peak flow rate was 33700m³/s. It was a flood in 130 years. The affected farmland was 480,000 hm², and the affected population reached 8.17 million, with 249 deaths. The largest in Guangxi. 90% of the streets in the industrial city of Liuzhou are flooded.

From June 5 to 27, 1998, heavy rains occurred in the Pearl River basin. There was a catastrophic flood in the Xi River in the past 100 years. The flood peak level is 26.51m in the Zhangzhou Hydrological Station with the flood peak flow of 52,900m³/s, which was the second largest flood in the Zhangzhou station since the founding of the People's Republic of China. According to the statistics of Guangdong and Guangxi provinces (autonomous regions), there has been no breakage on either side of the river. The number of people affected by the storm and flood reached 14.98 million, the area affected by crops was 903,300 hm², 156 people died, and the direct economic loss was about 16.03 billion yuan.

In the beginning of July, 2001, the coastal areas of Guangxi and the Xi River Basin were flooded with heavy rains caused by the typhoon No. 0103 and No. 0104,. The Yujiang River experienced the largest flood since the founding of the People's Republic of China. On July 8, Nanning Hydrological Station showed a peak water level of 77.18m and a maximum flow of 13400m³/s. The storm and flood caused 14.465 million people in Guangxi and Guizhou to be affected, 32 people died due to the disaster, and the direct economic loss was 15.174 billion yuan.

The period from May to October is the typhoon season on the southeast coast of China. Under a strong typhoon, it sometimes leads to a violent tide, which causes the seawall in the coastal tidal zone of the Pearl River Delta to be destroyed.

== Precautions ==
There are 926,600 feet of the cultivated land threatened by floods in the Pearl River Basin, affecting 20 million population. The Pearl River floods are mainly concentrated in the confluence zones of the Pearl River Delta, the Lancang River, and the Liutun River. These areas are densely populated and economically developed. Although most of these areas have the embankment protection, the flood control standards are not strictly. Except for the Bei embankment in Guangzhou, which has is defended against floods likely to occur during a 20-year period, most of them have only defense for an expected 10 years of flooding. According to the principle of "combination of embankment, venting and storage", in the 1980s, three flood control projects combined with dikes were planned:

- (1) The combined flood control project of the middle and lower reaches of the West and Bei Rivers. The construction of Feilaixia Reservoir in the middle and lower reaches of the Bei River can control the drainage area of 34,097 km^{2}, accounting for 73% of the Beitun River Basin. It mainly protects the deltas of Guangzhou and the lower reaches of the Bei River. The benefit area is 106,600 hectares and the population is 3.38 million. The Feilaixia Reservoir cooperates with the reinforcement of the Beijiang Dike to defend against the floods in the past 100 years, enabling Guangzhou to withstand an expected 300–500 years of flooding from the Bei River. The construction of Longtan Reservoir in Hongshui River in the upper reaches of the Xi River can control the drainage area of 98,500 km^{2} and the flood control capacity of 7 billion m^{3} The Da Tengxia Reservoir was built in the city, with a controlled drainage area of 197755 km^{2} and a flood storage capacity of 2 billion m^{3}. The joint operation of Longtan and Datengxia reservoirs can effectively control the flood of the mainstream of the Xi River. The flood control project system consisting of the above three reservoirs and the corresponding dikes can ensure flood control safety in key areas of Guangzhou and Delta.
- (2) The flood control engineering system combined with the dikes of the middle and lower reaches of the Yujiang River. The Baise Reservoir was built in Yujiang, and the control basin area was 19,600 km^{2}. The flood control standard of Nanning City could be raised to 50 years by the reservoir regulation. The Laokou Reservoir was rebuilt with the prospect, and the control basin area was 73,344 km^{2}, accounting for 99.5% of the area above Nanning. The combined use of the two systems will enable the flood control standard of Nanning to reach 100 years.
- (3) The combined flood control project system of the middle and lower reaches of the Dongpu River, the newly controlled Fengfeng River and Maple Dam, the control area of the Baipenzhu Reservoir is 11,740 km^{2}, accounting for 43.5% of the drainage area. The combined use of the three reservoirs, combined with the reinforcement of the dikes, can raise the flood control standards of the middle and lower reaches of the Dongjiang River to a hundred years.
