= July 2012 Beijing flood =

Chinese flood

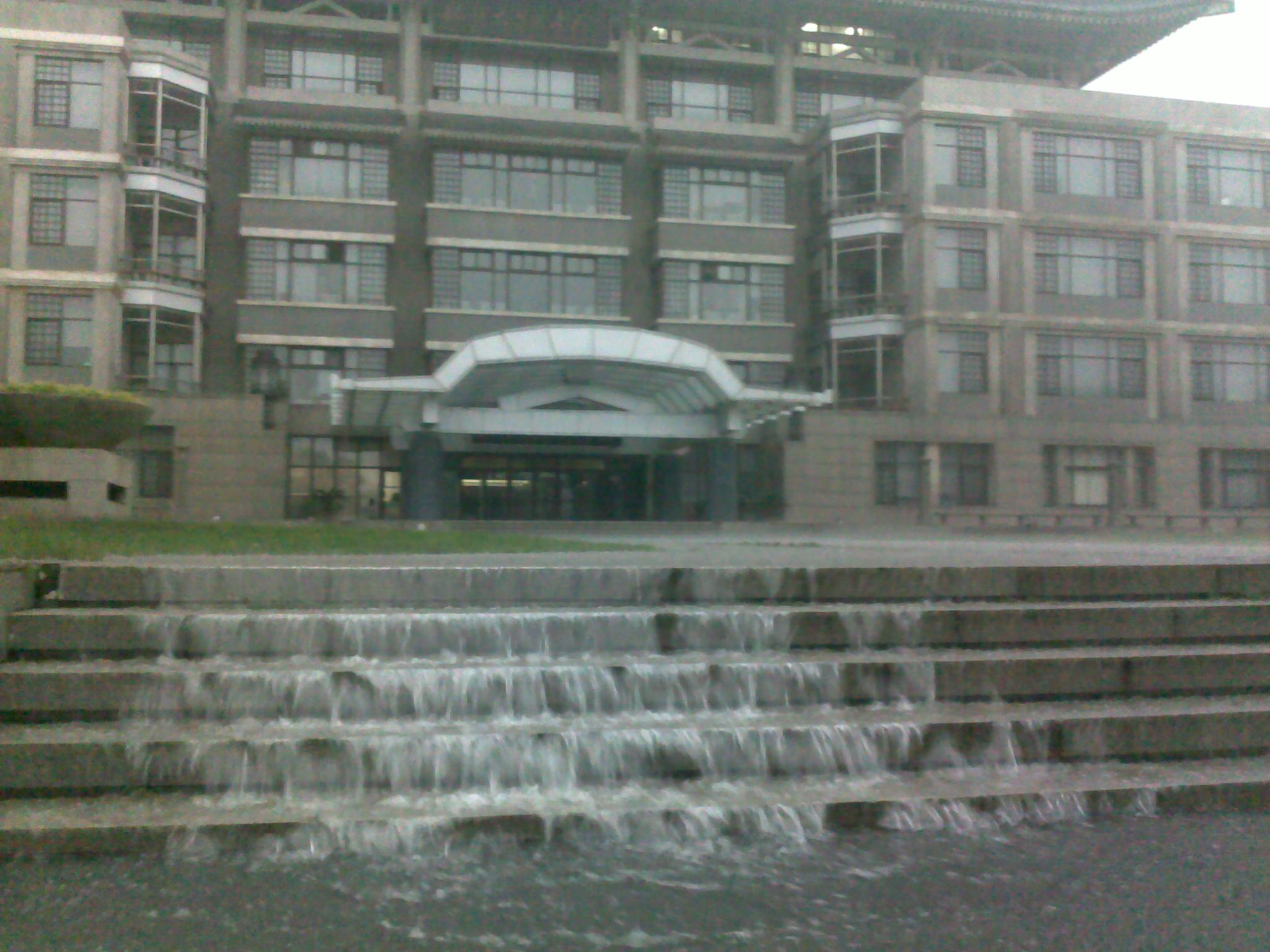
- Flood at Peking University
- Date: July 21, 2012 (CST)
- Location: China (Beijing)
- Deaths: 79+ (26 flooded)
- Property damage: $1.6 billion USD

The July 2012 Beijing flood was part of a series of 2012 flooding events across China that began in late spring of 2012 and continued during the summer. In July, the areas of southwestern China, including Guangxi Zhuang Autonomous Region, and northeastern China including Beijing, Hubei and Liaoning were worst-affected.

In a twenty-hour period on July 21, 2012, a flash flood hit the city of Beijing in the People's Republic of China. Within a day of the flooding, 56,933 people had been evacuated, while the floodwaters killed 79 people, causing at least 10 billion Yuan (US$1.6 billion) in damages and destroying at least 8,200 homes. In the city, more than 1.6 million people were affected by the flood overall.

Fangshan District was the most heavily affected area of Beijing, located in the southwest, which received a record-setting 460 mm (18 in) of rain, while on average the city received 170 mm (6.7 in) during the same period, the highest recorded since 1951. The Juma River flooded its banks and reached a flow rate of 2,500 m^{3} (88,000 cu ft) per second. A woman in Fangshan reported the river rose 1.3 metres on her home in approximately ten minutes.

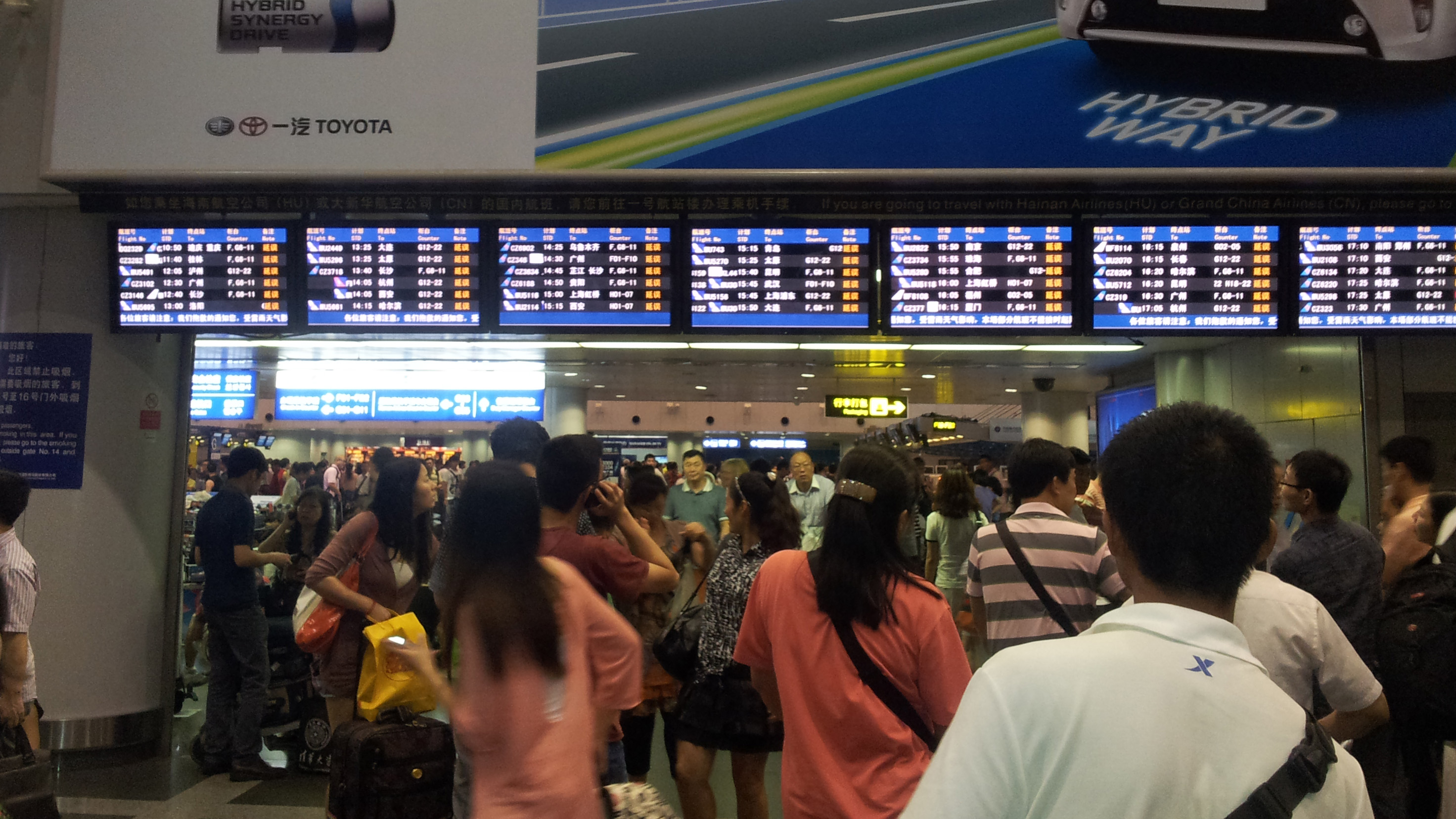
Flights delayed in Beijing Capital International Airport

At Beijing Capital International Airport, the floods resulted in the cancellation of over 500 flights, stranding 80,000 travellers.

Urban flooding has recently become more frequent and severe in China. The main causes of the increase in flooding are the limited capacity of urban drainage networks, a loss of natural water bodies, and the loss of land during the urbanization of China. The flooding in Beijing resulted from these factors as well as the heaviest rainfall to hit Beijing in 60 years.

== See also ==
- 2010 China floods
- 2011 China floods
