= National Meteorological Center of CMA =

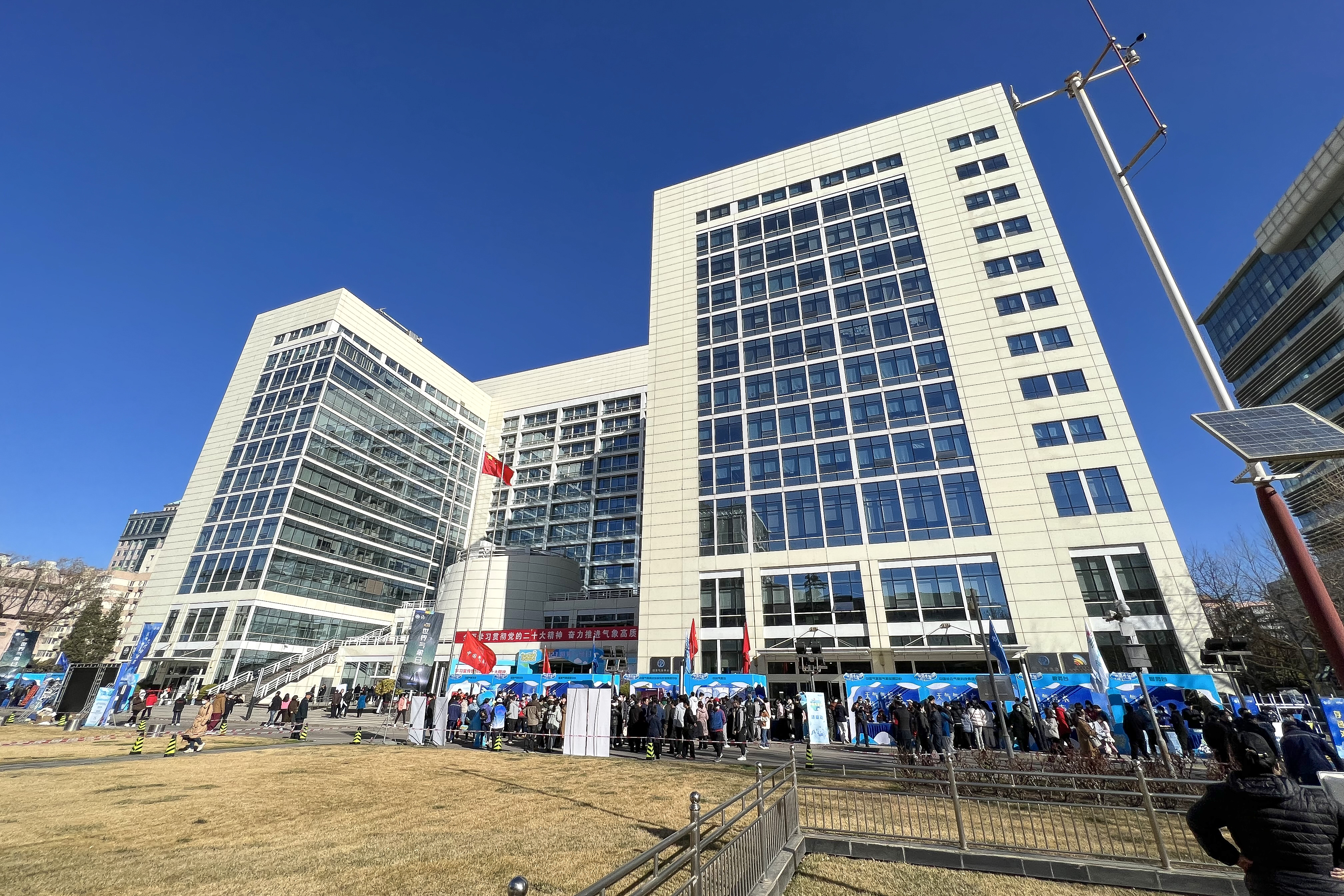
- NMC headquarters building.
- Abbreviation: NMC
- Established: 1 March 1950 (76 years ago)
- Country: China
- Parent organisations: China Meteorological Administration

National Meteorological Center of CMA
- Simplified Chinese: 国家气象中心
- Traditional Chinese: 國家氣象中心
Transcriptions
Standard Mandarin
- Hanyu Pinyin: Guójiā Qìxiàng Zhōngxīn

Alternative Chinese name
- Simplified Chinese: 中央气象台
- Traditional Chinese: 中央氣象台
Transcriptions
Standard Mandarin
- Hanyu Pinyin: Zhōngyāng Qìxiàng Tái

National Meteorological Center of CMA (Chinese: 中央气象台) is a subordinate body of the China Meteorological Administration in the People's Republic of China. It is a center for national weather forecasting, climate prediction, climate change study, meteorological information collection and dissemination. It is also designated by the World Meteorological Organization (WMO) as the Regional Specialized Meteorological Center (RSMC) for Asia in case of accidental release and dispersion of radioactive substances. The NMC is also the regional meteorological data telecommunication hub for Asia.

The NMC does not only issue full bulletins for tropical cyclones over the northwest Pacific Ocean and the South China Sea. For the Belt and Road as well as the remnants which could impact Tibet and Yunnan occasionally, the NMC started to issue full bulletins for cyclonic storms over the north Indian Ocean (except the Gulf of Aden) on an exclusive page since late 2017.

== Organization ==
The center has different sections:

- Weather forecasting office for public and marine interests.
- Numerical prediction models department.
- Specialized meteorological forecast desks for agrometeorology, remote sensing, severe weather monitoring and warnings, forecasting systems laboratory.
