= Kim Jae Kyoung =

South Korean biomedical mathematician (born 1982)

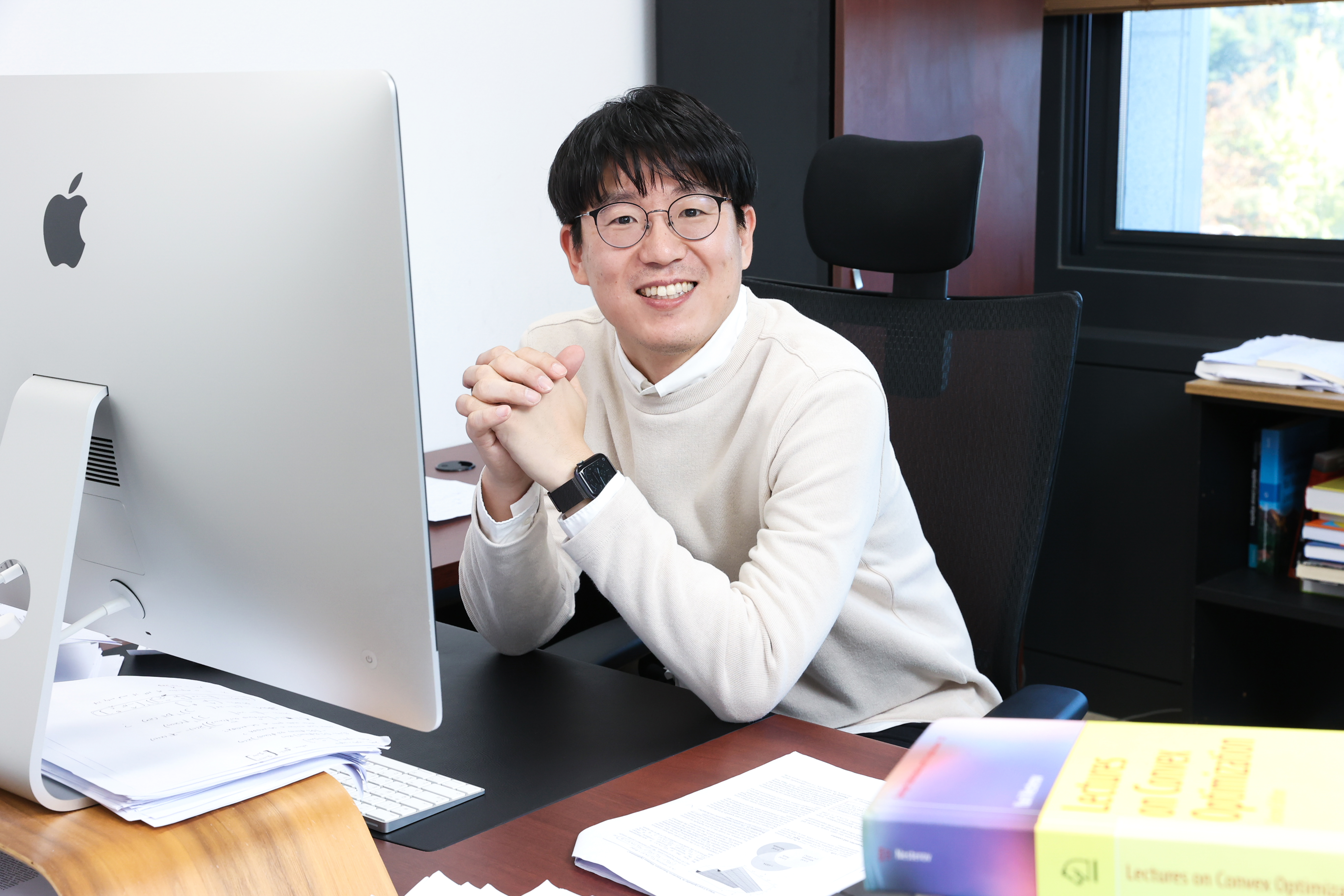
- Born: December 14, 1982 (age 43); Daegu, South Korea
- Education: PhD
- Alma mater: University of Michigan, Seoul National University
- Scientific career
- Fields: Mathematical biology, circadian rhythms, sleep, single-cell sequencing, cancer, multi-scale stochastic systems, machine learning, pharmacosytems model
- Institutions: Institute for Basic Science, KAIST, Korea Institute for Advanced Study, University of Michigan, Mathematical Biosciences Institute
- Thesis: Mathematical Modeling and Analysis of Cellular Clocks (2012)
- Doctoral advisor: Daniel Forger, Victoria Booth
- Other academic advisors: Trachette Jackson

Korean name
- Hangul: 김재경
- Hanja: 金載暻
- RR: Gim Jaegyeong
- MR: Kim Chaegyŏng
- Website: IBS Biomedical Mathematics Group; Lab at KAIST

Kim Jae Kyoung (Korean: 김재경; born December 14, 1982) is a biomedical mathematician and associate professor at KAIST in the Department of Mathematical Sciences and a chief investigator in the Pioneer Research Center for Mathematical and Computational Sciences at the Institute for Basic Science. His research focuses on mathematical biology and medicine, specifically the combination of nonlinear dynamics, the theory of stochastic processes, and computational science, to better understand disease mechanisms and develop relevant treatment strategies, including drug and digital medicine for sleep disorders.

== Education ==
Kim was born in Daegu, South Korea in 1982. He attended Yeungnam Middle School and Yeungnam High School before moving to Seoul where he graduated summa cum laude with a B.A. in mathematics education from Seoul National University in 2005. Reading a news article about using math to study heart disease led him to the University of Michigan as it was known for mathematical biology. He received his Ph.D. in applied and interdisciplinary mathematics in 2013. He received the Sumner Byron Myers Prize for this thesis on cellular clocks. His advisors were Daniel Forger and Victoria Booth while Trachette Jackson was a thesis committee member.

== Career ==
Kim was a postdoctoral fellow at the Mathematical Biosciences Institute within Ohio State University. Returning to Korea, he served as an assistant and associate professor in the Department of Mathematical Science in KAIST. He also worked as an associate member at the Korea Institute for Advanced Study from 2018 and then as a visiting scholar in the Department of Mathematics in the University of Michigan from 2019 to 2020. He became a member of Young Korean Academy of Science and Technology in 2019.

In March 2021, Kim became a chief investigator of the Pioneer Research Center for Mathematical and Computational Sciences at the Institute for Basic Science (IBS), heading the Biomedical Mathematics Group (BIMAG). Three teams conduct research at BIMAG. The Intracellular Dynamics Team develops reduction methods for multi-scale stochastic systems and identifies molecular mechanisms underlying robust circadian rhythms. The Intercellular Dynamics Team develops inference methods for dynamic networks and causes of and treatment strategies for circadian rhythm sleep disorders at the network level. The Systemic Dynamics Team develops methods for analyzing noisy human activity data from wearable devices and their application to identify optimal sleep patterns, and develops chronotherapy for sleep disorders and cancer.

=== Mechanisms for period regulation of circadian clock ===
Despite temperature changes, Kim found a mathematical model which underlies a molecular mechanism for regulation of the circadian clock. This biological clock was discovered in 1954, but the method for how it operates took more than 60 years to understand. Relevant factors include the topology of biochemical network underlying the circadian clock, phospho-switch that controls stability of key repressor proteins can compensate the effects of temperature, cells in the mammalian circadian clocks are coupled to generate synchronized rhythms, and a mechanism that filters stochasticity in the circadian clock.

=== Mathematical models to treat diseases caused by disrupted circadian rhythms ===
Misalignment of circadian rhythms with the external environment can cause significant physiological problems. Kim studied the drug PF-670462 which aims to realign the circadian clock. Using pharmacokinetic data, he built a pharmacology model and analyzed the phase response curve to the drug and light which helped to predict the drug's effect under various environmental conditions. As disruption of circadian rhythms increases the risk of getting cancer, he studied the interactions between p53 and PER2.

=== Derivation of validity condition for stochastic QSSA ===
Kim was the first to propose and then prove multiple results in justifying the stochastic quasi-steady state approximation (QSSA). The approximation has been widely used to reduce stochastic model of various biological systems. Despite its common use, there has been a critical problem in understanding whether the stochastic QSSA is accurate and under what conditions it may fail. Kim has worked to developing a method to compute the error of the stochastic QSSA directly. This provided a clear guideline for when and how to use the stochastic QSSA. Furthermore, he developed a new method for simplifying models when the stochastic QSSA is invalid.

=== Discovering and correcting the error in the equation of FDA guidelines ===
Kim found errors in the US Food and Drug Administration's (FDA) current guidance for predicting how drugs interact in the body and created a more accurate formula. The current FDA method is inaccurate, requiring artificial adjustments. The new formula is based on an improved mathematical foundation and can accurately predict drug metabolism rates without artificial factors. When tested, the new formula predicted drug interactions accurately 80% of the time compared to 38% with the equation in FDA guidance. This improvement could greatly enhance drug development and safety in clinical use.

=== Software development ===
BIMAG has also made various software during their research, including mathematical models for biological oscillators, Bayesian inference algorithms, stochastic analysis, causality inference, diagnosis for sleep disorders, and sleep data imputation.

== Journal editing ==
Jae Kyoung has been an editorial board member of Journal of Biological Rhythms, PLOS One, Journal of Theoretical Biology, Mathematical Biosciences, Current Opinion in Systems Biology, npj Systems Biology and Applications, npj Biological Timing and Sleep, and PLOS Computational Biology, as well as a guest associate editor of PLOS Computational Biology. He will serve as an editorial board member of SIAM Review from 2025 to 2028. He is the Editor-in-Chief of Current Opinion in Systems Biology.

== Awards and honors ==
- 2025: Scientist of the Year Award, Korea Science Journalists Association
- 2023: Commendation, Ministry of Science and ICT
- 2023: KAIST Global Research Cooperation Award, KAIST
- 2021: (Choi Seok-jeong Award), Ministry of Science and ICT and Korean Mathematical Society
- 2019: J. Shelton Horsley Research Award, Virginia Academy of Science
- 2019: Teaching Award, KAIST, College of Natural Sciences
- 2017: Grant, Human Frontier Science Program
- 2017: KSIAM Young Researcher Award, Korea Society of Industrial and Applied Mathematics
- 2017: Ewon Assistant Professorship for Outstanding Junior Faculty, KAIST
- 2016: Teaching Award, KAIST, College of Natural Sciences
- 2016: 30 Young Leading Scientists of Korea, POSTEC and The Dong-A Ilbo
- 2015: Chungam Science Fellow, POSCO TJ Park Foundation
- 2015: Sangsan Young Mathematician Award, Korean Mathematical Society
- 2013: Sumner Byron Myers Prize, University of Michigan
- 2012: Department of Mathematics Outstanding Teaching Award, University of Michigan
- 2010: Rackham International Student Fellowship, University of Michigan
- 2006: Air Force Chief of Staff's Award, Pedagogic Method Announcement Contest, Republic of Korea Air Force
- 2005: Dean's Citation for Excellent Learning, Seoul National University

== Scientific societies and committees ==
- 2023: Nomination Committee of Society for Industrial and Applied Mathematics Dynamical Systems
- 2021–2023: Public Outreach Committee of Society for Research on Biological Rhythms
- 2021: Organizational Committee of Society for Mathematical Biology SMB2021
- 2020, 2022: Nomination Committee of Society for Industrial and Applied Mathematics Life Sciences
- 2019–present: Member of Young Korean Academy of Science and Technology
- 2018–present: Applied Mathematics Committee of Korean Mathematical Society
- 2018–present: International Exchange Committee of Korea Society for Industrial and Applied Mathematics
- 2016–present: Steering Committee of Population Approach Group in Korea
- 2015–present: Board member of Korea Society for Industrial and Applied Mathematics
- 2015–present: Member of Korean Mathematical Society
- 2014–present: Member of Society for Mathematical Biology
- 2013–present: Member of Biophysical Society
- 2012–present: Member of Society for Research on Biological Rhythms
- 2009–present: Member of Society for Industrial and Applied Mathematics
- 2009–present: Member of American Mathematical Society

== Selected publications ==
- Jo, Hyeontae; Hong, Hyukpyo; Hwang, Hyung Ju; Chang, Won; Kim, Jae Kyoung (26 December 2023). "Density physics-informed neural networks reveal sources of cell heterogeneity in signal transduction". Patterns. 5 (2). doi:10.1016/j.patter.2023.100899. PMC 10873160. PMID 38370126.
- Park, Se Ho; Ha, Seokmin; Kim, Jae Kyoung (24 July 2023). "A general model-based causal inference method overcomes the curse of synchrony and indirect effect". Nature Communications. 14 (1): 4287. Bibcode:2023NatCo..14.4287P. doi:10.1038/s41467-023-39983-4. PMC 10366229. PMID 37488136.
- Song, Yun Min; Choi, Su Jung; Park, Se Ho; Lee, Soo Jin; Joo, Eun Yeon; Kim, Jae Kyoung (1 September 2023). "A real-time, personalized sleep intervention using mathematical modeling and wearable devices". Sleep. 46 (9) zsad179. doi:10.1093/sleep/zsad179. PMID 37422720.
- Choi, Boseung; Rempala, Grzegorz A.; Kim, Jae Kyoung (5 December 2017). "Beyond the Michaelis-Menten equation: Accurate and efficient estimation of enzyme kinetic parameters". Scientific Reports. 7 (1): 17018. Bibcode:2017NatSR...717018C. doi:10.1038/s41598-017-17072-z. PMC 5717222. PMID 29208922.
- Jeong, Eui Min; Kwon, Miri; Cho, Eunjoo; Lee, Sang Hyuk; Kim, Hyun; Kim, Eun Young; Kim, Jae Kyoung (22 February 2022). "Systematic modeling-driven experiments identify distinct molecular clockworks underlying hierarchically organized pacemaker neurons". Proceedings of the National Academy of Sciences of the United States of America. 119 (8) e2113403119. Bibcode:2022PNAS..11913403J. doi:10.1073/pnas.2113403119. PMC 8872709. PMID 35193959.
- Song, Yun Min; Hong, Hyukpyo; Kim, Jae Kyoung (18 October 2018). "Universally valid reduction of multiscale stochastic biochemical systems using simple non-elementary propensities". PLOS Computational Biology. 17 (10) e1008952. doi:10.1371/journal.pcbi.1008952. PMC 8562860. PMID 34662330.
- Zhou, Min; Kim, Jae Kyoung; Eng, Gracie Wee Ling; Forger, Daniel B.; Virshup, David M. (1 October 2015). "A Period2 phosphoswitch regulates and temperature compensates circadian period". Molecular Cell. 60 (1): 77–88. doi:10.1016/j.molcel.2015.08.022. PMID 26431025.
- Ye, Chen; Kim, Jae Kyoung; Hirning, Andrew J.; Josić, Kresimir; Bennett, Matthew R. (August 2015). "Emergent genetic oscillations in a synthetic microbial consortium". Science. 349 (6251): 986–989. Bibcode:2015Sci...349..986C. doi:10.1126/science.aaa3794. PMC 4597888. PMID 26315440.

== See also ==
- Trachette Jackson
- Hiroki Ueda
- John B. Hogenesch
- Santiago Schnell
