= European Society for Mathematical and Theoretical Biology =

European mathematical society

- Abbreviation: ESMTB
- Established: 1991
- Type: Nonprofit
- Legal status: Academic professional body
- Location: Europe
- Region served: International
- Services: Membership; Publications; Meetings
- Fields: Applied Mathematics; Biology; Medicine
- President: Benoît Perhame
- Vice-President: Victor Pérez
- Treasurer: Angélique Stéphanou
- Secretary: Zuzanna Szymańska
- Main organ: European Communications in Mathematical and Theoretical Biology
- Publication: Journal of Mathematical Biology
- Affiliations: European Mathematical Society; International Council for Industrial and Applied Mathematics
- Website: www.esmtb.org

The European Society for Mathematical and Theoretical Biology (ESMTB) is a non-profit academic society designed to bring together mathematicians and biologists interested in the use of mathematical and theoretical techniques for the solution of biological and medical problems. It was founded in 1991 during the holding of its first conference in Alpe d'Huez, France. It is a member society of the European Mathematical Society (EMS) and the International Council for Industrial and Applied Mathematics (ICIAM). The society's official journal is the Journal of Mathematical Biology.

== History ==
=== Origins ===
The European Society for Mathematical and Theoretical Biology was founded in 1991 at its first conference, entitled European Conference on Mathematics Applied to Biology and Medicine, held in Alpe d'Huez. The mention of medicine in the title of this conference was relevant because much of the applied mathematics researched by members has related to medical topics. The founding President, James Murray developed models of wound healing as well as applying mathematics to many other areas of medicine and biology. Andrea De Gaetano is a qualified physician and has published many papers on applied mathematics in medicine. Ellen Baake has worked on mathematical immunobiology.

=== Past presidents ===
Presidents of the Society have reflected important developments in mathematical and theoretical biology.

Past presidents of ESMTB
Name	Duration	Affiliation
James D. Murray	1991-1993	University of Washington
Karl-Peter Hadeler	1994-1996	University of Tübingen
Jacques Demongeot	1997-1999	Grenoble Alpes University
Vincenzo Capasso	2000-2002	University of Milan
Mats Gyllenberg	2003-2005	University of Helsinki
Wolfgang Alt	2006-2008	University of Bonn
Carlos Braumann	2009-2011	University of Évora
Andrea Pugliese	2012-2014	University of Trento
Roeland Merks	2015-2017	University of Leiden
Andrea De Gaetano	2018-2020	Óbuda University (Note: Present affiliation. May have held different one(s) while President of ESMTB.)
Ellen Baake	2021-2023	Bielefeld University

== Activities ==
=== Aims ===
The aims of the Society are to promote the application of mathematical and theoretical solutions to biological (Note: Where "biological" is understood to also include "medical" given the activity in the field.) problems through organisation of meetings, support of publications, and benefits to members. (Note: Members gain access to the Society's publications and discounts to meetings.) The aims of the Society also involve collaborations with other organisations in the same and related fields.

=== Management ===
The activities of the ESMTB are managed by a Board elected by its members. The full board is given in the table below.

ESMTB Board (Note: The board members serve for different terms. See for more information.)
Position	Name	Affiliation
President	Benoît Perthame	Sorbonne University
Vice-President	Victor Pérez	University of Casta-La Mancha
Treasurer	Angélique Stéphanou	Grenoble Alpes University
Secretary	Zuzanna Szymańska	University of Warsaw
Other board members	Tom Britton	Stockholm University
Other board members	José A. Carrillo	University of Oxford
Other board members	Marie Doumic-Jauffret	Ecole Polytechnique
Other board members	Elisenda Feliu	University of Copenhagen
Other board members	Tommaso Lorenzi	Polytechnic University of Turin
Other board members	Nikolaos Sfakianakis	University of St Andrews

=== Affiliations and Partnerships ===
The academic credibility of the European Society for Mathematical and Theoretical Biology has been established through its affiliations and partnerships. The ESMTB is an Associate Member of the European Mathematical Society. It is an affiliated Member of the International Council for Industrial and Applied Mathematics. The ESMTB has partnerships with the Society for Mathematical Biology, the Japanese Society for Mathematical Biology, the NVTB (Dutch Society for Theoretical Biology) and the SFTB (Société Francophone de Biologie Théorique). Existing members of these organisations get discounts when applying for membership. The partnership with the Society for Mathematical Biology is particularly relevant, as the Society for Mathematical Biology states on its website: "The Society has agreed to hold a joint annual meeting with the European Society for Mathematical & Theoretical Biology every four years". The 2026 European Conference on Mathematical & Theoretical Biology was a joint event of ESMTB and the Society for Mathematical Biology.

=== Publications ===
The peer reviewed Journal of Mathematical Biology is the official journal of the Society. The ESMTB also publishes the European Communications in Mathematical and Theoretical Biology annually to its members. Members of the Society also receive the monthly ESMTB Newsletter. Under the title Perspectives in Mathematical Biology the ESMTB also invited short contributions on mathematical and theoretical biology that were published in the Journal of Mathematical Biology between 2006 and 2020. Since 2020 these contributions have been discontinued.

=== Meetings ===
The ESMTB holds biennial conferences. It also supports online colloqia, and summer schools (in conjunction with the European Mathematical Society).

=== Prizes ===
==== Reinardt Heinrich Award ====
The Society awards an annual Reinhardt Heinrich Doctoral Thesis Award in memory of Reinhardt Heinrich, to recognise outstanding doctoral thesis research, and to commemorate the role of Heinrich in mentoring young scientists. Recent recipients of the award are shown in the table below.

Reinhardt Heinrich Doctoral Thesis Award winners
Year	Name	Affiliation	Thesis title
2025 (Note: Not yet available in European Communications in Mathematical and Theoretical Biology.)	Carles Falcó	University of Oxford	Interactions and dynamics in collective cell behaviour
2024	Simon Syga	TU Dresden	Impacts of Genetic and Phenotypic Heterogeneity on Tumor Evolution
2023	Kishore Hari	Indian Institute of Science	Design Principles of Phenotypic Robustness and Plasticity in Gene Regulatory Networks Underlying Cancer Metastasis

==== Karl-Peter Hadeler Prize ====
The Society's official journal, the Journal of Mathematical Biology, awards the Karl-Peter Hadeler Prize to recognise outstanding publications in that journal. Karl-Peter Hadeler was both a founder of the Journal of Mathematical Biology and of the European Society for Mathematical and Theoretical Biology.

==== Ovide Arino Award ====
In collaboration with the Société Francophone de Biologie Théorique (SFBT) the ESMTB awards a prize to a researcher from a "Southern country" where "Southern" may be read as equivalent to developing country although in fact there is a specific list of eligible countries. The successful candidate must have been carrying out research in an eligible country at the time of application, in collaboration with a European or other French-speaking country. The award commemorates the French mathematician Ovide Arino.

== See also ==
- Mathematical and theoretical biology
- Bioinformatics
- Biomathematics
- Biophysics
- Biostatistics
- Computational biology
- Mathematical modelling of infectious diseases
- Theoretical ecology
- Applied mathematics
