= Richard Bertram (mathematician) =

American biomathematics professor

Richard Bertram is a mathematician who works in the field of biomathematics. He is an endowed professor and head of the biomathematics program at Florida State University and a fellow of the Society for Mathematical Biology (SMB).

== Education ==
Bertram earned his Bachelors degree and Ph.D at Florida State University. He completed his Ph.D in 1993 under supervisor Jeronimo Magnan.

== Career ==
In 2010 Bertram was named director of the Florida State University biomathematics program. Beginning in 2014, he spent ten years as deputy editor for Mathematical Biosciences, a peer-reviewed academic journal published by Elsevier. In 2017, the Society for Industrial and Applied Mathematics awarded Bertram the Outstanding Paper Prize for a paper with Theodore Vo and Martin Wechselberger.

In 2023, he became a fellow of the SMB and the following year he was elected to the society's Board of Directors.

== Selected publications ==
- Vo, Theodore; Bertram, Richard; Wechselberger, Martin (January 2013). "Multiple Geometric Viewpoints of Mixed Mode Dynamics Associated with Pseudo-plateau Bursting". SIAM Journal on Applied Dynamical Systems. 12 (2): 789–830. doi:10.1137/120892842.
- Bertram, Richard; Butte, Manish J.; Kiemel, Tim; Sherman, Arthur (1 January 1995). "Topological and phenomenological classification of bursting oscillations". Bulletin of Mathematical Biology. 57 (3): 413–439. doi:10.1016/S0092-8240(05)81776-8. ISSN 0092-8240.
