= Biomodeling =

Biomodeling may refer to:

- Mathematical Biology - the scientific discipline of building advanced mathematical models of biochemical systems thanks to advances in computer power and quantitative methods.
- Biomedical modeling - the process of building complex 3D models of body parts through a computer imaging process which allows for perfectly shaped acrylic or titanium inserts to be constructed to replace broken bones or other body parts.
- BioModels Database - an online database of annotated open biological models, written in Systems Biology Markup Language (SBML)
