= George Karreman =

American scientist (1920–1997)

- Born: November 4, 1920; Rotterdam, Netherlands
- Died: February 27, 1997 (aged 76); Philadelphia, United States
- Education: Leiden University, University of Chicago
- Known for: Quantum biology
- Scientific career
- Fields: Physics, mathematical biology, Quantum biology
- Workplaces: University of Pennsylvania
- Doctoral advisor: Nicolas Rashevsky
- Other academic advisors: Hendrik Anthony Kramers

George Karreman (4 November 1920 – 27 February 1997) was a Dutch-born US physicist, mathematical biophysicist and mathematical/theoretical biologist. He was the first president of the Society for Mathematical Biology (SMB).

== Biography ==
Karreman's father was Chief Engineer for the Dutch Merchant Marine. George Karreman studied physics and mathematics at Leiden University. In August 1948 Karreman emigrated to Chicago, USA, where he contacted Nicolas Rashevsky at the University of Chicago. He became one of Rashevsky' s best PhD students in Mathematical Biophysics. In 1950 Karreman underwent experimental heart surgery for an aortic coarctation at the University of Chicago. He married Anneke Halbertsma in 1953, and they moved to Cape Cod, Massachusetts, where their daughter, Grace, was born in 1954. In succession, his first son, Frank Karreman was born in 1958, and then in 1962 his second son, Hubert-Jan. Later, his three children received advanced degrees from the University of Pennsylvania in several fields.

He had a wide range of interests in his readings and a keen interest in the fine arts, such as paintings, and was an advanced chess player. Between 1987 and 1997, he frequently travelled to the Pacific Northwest where his son and daughter had their homes and children.

== Academic career ==
Karreman earned his B.S. in Physics and Mathematics in 1939. He completed in 1941 his M.S. in Theoretical Physics under the supervision of Hendrik Anthony Kramers at Leiden University. For the remainder of World War II he survived by tutoring students in physics and mathematics. He was awarded a University of Chicago Fellowship that supported him to complete a Ph.D. in Mathematical Biology in 1951 under the supervision of the founder of Mathematical Biophysics and Mathematical Biology, Nicolas Rashevsky. Karreman was then selected as a consultant to Albert Szent-Györgyi at the Institute for Muscle Research, Marine Biological Laboratory, Woods Hole. To follow his interest in mathematics applied to biology, physiology, and medicine he went to Philadelphia in 1957, to take up the position of Senior Medical Research Scientist at the Eastern Research Center. He was appointed associate professor of physiology at the School of Medicine in the University of Pennsylvania, where he also worked at the Bockus Research Institute at the Graduate Hospital. He was promoted to Full Professor of Physiology at the same university in 1972, where he held this position until 1983, when he became the first Professor Emeritus of Mathematical Biology. His main research interests were many, but all were in related fields that included: mathematical biology and mathematical biophysics, membrane biophysics, photosynthetic mechanisms, quantum biochemistry and quantum biophysics, biological energy transfer, quantum biology, physiological irritability, mathematical and systems analysis of cardiovascular and other biosystems, cooperativity, threshold phenomena in biomembranes, adsorption mechanisms at membrane surfaces and ion binding to biomembranes.

After Rashevsky's death in 1972, Karreman was a co-founder of the Society for Mathematical Biology (SMB) in 1974—together with H. Landahl and A. Bartholomay, and in 1975 he became its first president. Karreman was also a member of several prestigious scientific societies, including the American Physiological Society, the New York Academy of Sciences, the Franklin Institute, the Society for Supramolecular Biology, Sigma Xi, the Physiological Society of Philadelphia, and the Society for Vascular System Dynamics.

== Honours ==
- 1974 – First President of the Society for Mathematical Biology.

== See also ==
- Society for Mathematical Biology
- Mathematical and theoretical biology
- Quantum biology
- Nicolas Rashevsky
- Hendrik Anthony Kramers

== Selected publications ==
- George Karreman, R.H. Steele, and Albert Szent-Gyorgyi. "On resonance transfer of excitation energy between aromatic aminoacids in proteins.", Proc. Natl. Acad. Sci. (1958) 44: 140-143.
- George Karreman. "Contributions to quantum biology. I. Mobile electronic characteristics of riboflavin radicals.", Bulletin of Mathematical Biology, Volume 23, Number 1/March, (1961) 55-68. Abstract.
- George Karreman. "Studies in quantum biology. II. The mobile electron characteristics of tryptophan+ in relation to those of FMN−, FMNH and FMNH 2+". Bulletin of Mathematical Biology, Volume 23, Number 2/June, (1961) 135-140, doi:10.1007/BF02477467; Abstract.
- George Karreman. "Cooperative specific adsorption of ions at charged sites in an electric field." Bulletin of Mathematical Biology, Volume 27, Supplement 1 / January, 1965, 91-104., doi:10.1007/BF02477265.
- George Karreman. "Electronic Aspects of Quantum Biology." Annals of the New York Academy of Sciences, Volume 96, Issue on Mathematical Theories of Biological Phenomena, Pages 1029 - 1055, published on line on 15 Dec 2006, doi:10.1111/j.1749-6632.1962.tb54118.x
- George Karreman. "Mathematical Biology of Physiological Excitation", Synthese 9, no. 3-5 (1953): 248.
- George Karreman. "Towards a physical understanding of physiological excitation as a cooperative specific adsorption phenomenon.", Bulletin of Mathematical Biology, Volume 35, Numbers 1-2 / February, 1973, 149-171, doi:10.1007/BF02558803.
- George Karreman, "Recent mathematical-biological studies of communication.", Synthese 9, no. 3-5 (1953): 255.
