= Philip Maini =

Northern Irish mathematician (born 1959)

Philip Maini FRS FMedSci
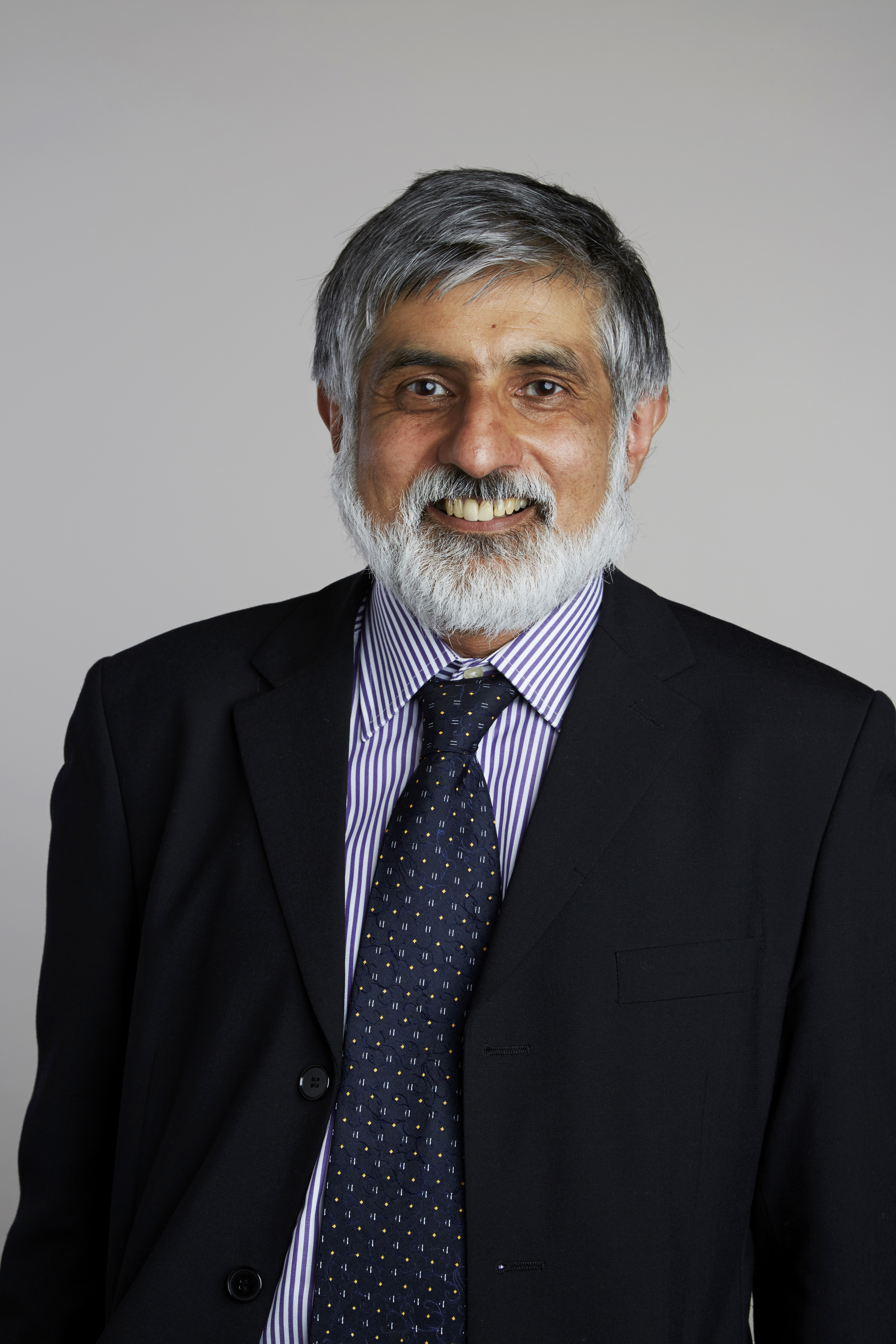
- Philip Maini in 2015
- Born: Philip Kumar Maini; 16 October 1959 (age 66); Magherafelt, Northern Ireland
- Education: University of Oxford (BA, PhD)
- Awards: Naylor Prize and Lectureship (2009); Arthur T. Winfree Prize (2017); FRS (2015); Sylvester Medal (2024)
- Scientific career
- Fields: Mathematics; Mathematical biology
- Workplaces: University of Oxford; University of Utah
- Thesis: On mechanochemical models for morphogenetic pattern (1985)
- Doctoral advisor: James D. Murray
- Doctoral students: Ruth Baker; Santiago Schnell
- Website: people.maths.ox.ac.uk/maini/

Philip Kumar Maini (born 16 October 1959 in Magherafelt, Northern Ireland) is a Northern Irish mathematician. Since 1998, he has been the Professor of Mathematical Biology at the University of Oxford and is the director of the Wolfson Centre for Mathematical Biology in the Mathematical Institute.

== Personal life ==
Philip Maini is the son of father Panna Lal Maini and mother Satya Wati Bhandari. Panna Lal and Satya Wati were from Punjab, India. Panna Lal traveled to Northern Ireland in 1954. He had sailed to London on the ship RMS Maloja of the Peninsula and Orient Steam Navigation Company arriving there on 18 February 1954. Satya Wati and Philip's elder brother Arvind did not arrive in Northern Ireland until 1957.

== Education ==
Maini was educated at Rainey Endowed School in County Londonderry and Balliol College, Oxford where he was awarded a BA in 1982 and a DPhil in 1985, the latter for a thesis modelling morphogenetic pattern formation supervised by James D. Murray

== Research and career ==
After a postdoctoral research position at Oxford and an associate professorship at the University of Utah, he returned to Oxford in 1990 as university lecturer in mathematical biology with a tutorial fellowship at Brasenose College, Oxford. He became director of the Wolfson Centre for Mathematical Biology in 1998, then Statutory Professor in Mathematical Biology and professorial fellow of St John's College, Oxford in 2005.

Maini's research includes mathematical modelling of tumours, wound healing and embryonic pattern formation, and the theoretical analysis of these models. His research has been funded by the Engineering and Physical Sciences Research Council (EPSRC) and Biotechnology and Biological Sciences Research Council (BBSRC). He has supervised 53 PhD students.

From 2002 to 2015 Maini was the editor-in-chief of the Bulletin of Mathematical Biology and has served on the editorial boards of many other journals. Maini gave an invited talk at ICM 2010 in Hyderabad, speaking on "Modelling Aspects of Tumour Metabolism."

== Awards and honours ==
Maini was elected a Fellow of the Royal Society (FRS) in 2015. His certificate of election reads:

Philip Maini's mathematical and computational modelling of spatiotemporal processes in biology and medicine has led to significant scientific advances in both. His work on biological pattern formation has led to detailed understanding of the roles of noise, domain growth and gradients in pattern generation. He has generalised the concept of gradient information and has proposed an experimentally consistent resolution of the chemotactic wave paradox. He has developed multiscale models for wound healing and for vascular tumour growth. He has thereby elucidated the underlying mechanisms by which particular growth factors reduce scar formation and has provided detailed insight into the design of combination cancer therapy.

Maini was an elected member of the boards of the Society for Mathematical Biology and the European Society for Mathematical and Theoretical Biology. He is a Fellow of the Institute of Mathematics and its Applications (IMA), the Society for Industrial and Applied Mathematics (SIAM), and the Royal Society of Biology, and is a corresponding member of the Mexican Academy of Sciences. He has held visiting positions at universities worldwide. In 2017, he was elected to a fellowship of the Academy of Medical Sciences and the next year elected a Foreign Fellow by the Indian National Science Academy. In 2021, he was elected Fellow of the European Academy of Sciences and a Fellow of the American Association for the Advancement of Science.

Maini co-authored a 1997 Bellman Prize-winning paper and received a Royal Society Leverhulme Trust Senior Research Fellowship and Wolfson Research Merit Award, and the London Mathematical Society Naylor Prize.

In 2024 he was awarded the Sylvester Medal by the Royal Society "for his contributions to mathematical biology, especially the interdisciplinary modelling of biomedical phenomena and systems".
