= Gerda de Vries =

Canadian mathematician

Gerda de Vries is a Canadian mathematician whose research interests include dynamical systems and mathematical physiology. She is a professor of mathematical and statistical sciences at the University of Alberta, and the former president of the Society for Mathematical Biology.

== Education and career ==
De Vries graduated from the University of Waterloo in 1989, and completed her doctorate in 1995 at the University of British Columbia. Her dissertation, Analysis of Models of Bursting Electrical Activity in Pancreatic Beta Cells, was supervised by Robert M. Miura.

After postdoctoral research with Arthur Sherman at the National Institutes of Health, she joined the University of Alberta faculty in 1998. She was promoted to full professor in 2008.

== Publications ==
De Vries has published highly-cited research on beta cells and beta-actin. With Thomas Hillen, Mark A. Lewis, Johannes Müller, and Birgitt Schönfisch, she is also the author of a 2006 textbook, A Course in Mathematical Biology: Quantitative Modeling with Mathematical and Computational Methods.

== Recognition and service ==
De Vries served as president of the Society for Mathematical Biology for 2011–2013, and became a fellow of the society in 2017. In 2014 the Canadian Mathematical Society gave de Vries their excellence in teaching award. The society listed de Vries in their inaugural class of fellows in 2018.
