= Committee of Mathematical Biology =

The Committee on Mathematical Biology was a research and PhD-training unit at the University of Chicago, active from 1947 to 1965. It was the successor to the Section on Mathematical Biophysics (1940–1947), the world's first PhD-granting program in mathematical biology. Both were chaired by Nicolas Rashevsky, a Russian-born theoretical physicist who was one of the pioneers in descriptive biology with mathematical theory.

== Background ==
Rashevsky (1899–1972) earned his doctorate in theoretical physics at the University of Kiev in 1919 and left Russia after the revolution, arriving in the United States in 1924 to work at Westinghouse Research Laboratories. By 1933 he had published twelve papers in life sciences journals. Warren Weaver, director of the Natural Sciences Division of the Rockefeller Foundation, took notice. Under Weaver's support, Rashevsky came to Chicago in 1934 as a Rockefeller fellow and immediately organized a weekly seminar in "mathematical biophysics" deliberately open to physicists, chemists, mathematicians, physiologists, and psychologists at once.

== The Section on Mathematical Biophysics (1940–1947) ==
By 1937 the group included Alston S. Householder, Herbert D. Landahl, and Alvin M. Weinberg. Mainstream journals refused purely theoretical biological work, so in 1939 Rashevsky founded the Bulletin of Mathematical Biophysics himself. The Section received formal university recognition in 1940 within the Department of Physiology; Herbert D. Landahl was its first PhD graduate.

== The Committee (1947–1965) ==
In 1947 the Section was reorganized as the Committee on Mathematical Biology in the Division of Biological Sciences. A 1949 personnel roster lists nine researchers: Rashevsky as Professor and Chairman; H. D. Landahl, Associate Professor; I. Opatowski and Anatol Rapoport, Assistant Professors; H. G. Landau, Research Associate; and four Research Assistants and Fellows, including George Karreman. By November 1950 the group had grown to twelve members, with a combined budget of roughly $45,700 drawn from university funds, an Air Force contract, and foundation grants. The Committee's research covered six areas identified in its own fundraising documents: cell growth and division (with implications for cancer); cell respiration and tumor metabolism; nerve conduction theory; central nervous system dynamics; organic form; and the mathematical theory of human social behavior.

== The McCulloch–Pitts connection ==
Walter Pitts, a teenage autodidact, attended Rashevsky's seminars in the early 1940s. In 1943, Warren McCulloch and Pitts published "A Logical Calculus of the Ideas Immanent in Nervous Activity" in Rashevsky's Bulletin, well regarded as a founding paper in artificial neural network research. Rashevsky had published formal models of neural excitation in 1934.

Furthermore, following severe reductions in the committee, eight scholars, including McCulloch, defended the department, as :the only one of its kind, as of great importance to biology, medicine, mathematics, and psychology" in a 1956 letter in Science,.

== Finances ==
A 1949 appeal to the Lillia Babbitt Hyde Foundation claimed that "well over $200,000" had already invested by the University and Rockefeller Foundation combined into the committee.

Its budget in November 1950 stood at roughly $45,700, pieced together from university funds, an Air Force contract, and foundation grants. Neville D. Symonds was hired as Research Assistant that year at $2,500 per annum, split between two separate funding streams.

By 1952 Rashevsky was writing to industrial donors. Correspondence with the American Association of Advertising Agencies tested whether Anatol Rapoport's rumor-spread model might attract commercial money. The AAAA said no after Rashevsky conceded that actionable results could take "two years or twenty." The Inland Steel Foundation declined the same year.

In a 1950 letter to Chancellor Hutchins, Rashevsky noted that Chicago was the "only program of its kind in the world. Students had come from the Netherlands and Australia specifically because there was nowhere else." Thus, the committee was expected to absorb its PhD in mathematical biology graduates as they had no comparable institution to continue research.

In 1953–54, several members were accused of pro-communist sympathies. Rashevsky refused to dismiss them. The University cut his budget; two NIH grants lapsed; the Committee fell from eight members to three. A USPHS grant (GM-05181) kept the Committee alive from 1957 through 1964. In July 1964, having run out of ordinary options, Rashevsky resigned seven months before his scheduled retirement to force the administration's hand. President Beadle asked him to reconsider. He declined unless certain funding conditions were met. By December, he told his staff, his arrangements with the University of Michigan were "past the point of no return."

== Rashevsky's departure ==
On December 15, 1964, Rashevsky delivered a farewell address to the Committee's staff and students. The typescript records him saying: "I am leaving the University of Chicago, but I am not leaving any one of you." He named Landahl as his choice of chair, and arranged for students to consult him in Ann Arbor at the program's expense. He left for the University of Michigan's Mental Health Research Institute in 1965 and died in Holland, Michigan, on January 16, 1972.

== Legacy ==
The Society for Mathematical Biology was founded by three of Rashevsky's students — George Karreman, Herbert Landahl, and Anthony Bartholomay — after his widow transferred the Bulletin and its parent nonprofit to Landahl. Rashevsky's doctoral students include Anatol Rapoport, Robert Rosen, Clyde Coombs, and Herbert Landahl. By 1964, a University of Connecticut memo circulated to its deans described Rashevsky as "the grand old man of the field".
