= Yeungnam High School =

High school in Daegu, South Korea

Coordinates: 35.82133°N 128.53722°E

- Daegu; South Korea

Information
- Motto: Live Well
- Established: 1935; 91 years ago

Yeungnam High School is a school that is in Daegu, South Korea. The motto of the school is somewhat unusual, "Live well", which means hope for students to live collectively, remain hard-working and be right. The flower that symbolizes the school is a forsythia, and the tree of the school is Himalayan cedar.

== History ==
The school was established on 1 April 1935.

== Alumni ==
- Hong Jun-pyo, politician and former prosecutor
- Kim Jae Kyoung, biomedical mathematician
