= Journal of Mathematical Biology =

Mathematical biology academic journal

- Discipline: Biostatistics, Mathematical biology
- Language: English
- Edited by: Radek Erban, Thomas Hillen and Anna Marciniak-Czochra

Publication details
- History: 1974–present
- Publisher: Springer Verlag
- Frequency: Monthly
- Impact factor: 2.7 (2025)

Standard abbreviations
- ISO 4: J. Math. Biol.

Indexing
- CODEN: JMBLAJ
- ISSN: 0303-6812 (print); 1432-1416 (web)
- LCCN: 74645888
- OCLC no.: 01794831

Links
- Journal homepage

Journal of Mathematical Biology is a peer-reviewed, mathematics journal, published by Springer Verlag. Founded in 1974, the journal publishes articles on mathematical biology. In particular, papers published in this journal "should either provide biological insight as a result of mathematical analysis or identify and open up challenging new types of mathematical problems that derive from biological knowledge". It is the official journal of the European Society for Mathematical and Theoretical Biology. The editors-in-chief are Radek Erban, Thomas Hillen and Anna Marciniak-Czochra.

Abstracting and indexing

This journal is indexed in the following databases:

- Clarivate
  BIOSIS
  Biological Abstracts
  Current Contents / Life Sciences
  Journal Citation Reports
  Science Citation Index Expanded
  Web of Science
  Zoological Record
- Gale
  Academic OneFile
  Expanded Academic
- EBSCO host
  Academic Search
  EBSCO
- NAL Catalog
  AGRICOLA
- CAB Direct
  CAB Abstracts
  Global Health
- American Chemical Society
  Chemical Abstracts Service
- Elsevier
  EMBASE
  EMBiology
  SCOPUS
- NIH National Library of Medicine
  PubMed/MEDLINE
- Other databases
  Current Index to Statistics
  Digital Mathematics Registry
  Google Scholar
  IBIDS
  International Bibliography of Periodical Literature (IBZ)
  Mathematical Reviews
  OCLC
  Summon by Serial Solutions
  VINITI - Russian Academy of Science
  Zentralblatt Math
