= John J. Tyson =

American mathematical biologist

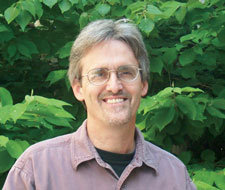
Portrait of John J. Tyson

John J. Tyson (born December 12, 1947, in Abington, Pennsylvania) is an American systems biologist and mathematical biologist who serves as university distinguished professor of biology at Virginia Tech, and is the former president of the Society for Mathematical Biology. He is known for his research on biochemical switches in the cell cycle, dynamics of biological networks and on excitable media.

== Education and career ==
Tyson earned a bachelor's degree in chemistry from Wheaton College, and received his PhD in chemical physics from the University of Chicago. After postdoctoral research at the Max Planck Institute for Biophysical Chemistry, a temporary position teaching mathematics at the University at Buffalo, and another post doctorate at the University of Innsbruck for biochemistry and experimental cancer research, he joined the Virginia Tech faculty in 1978 and is currently a university distinguished professor in biological sciences. He was president of the Society for Mathematical Biology for 1993–1995, and served as co-editor-in-chief of the Journal of Theoretical Biology from 1995 to 2004.

== Research ==
Since receiving his PhD in chemical physics at the University of Chicago in 1973, Tyson has been studying temporal and spatial organization in chemical, biochemical and biological systems. Recently he has focused on the macro-molecular reaction networks that process information in living cells and initiate appropriate responses in terms of cell growth, division and death. He represents the dynamics of these reaction networks in terms of mathematical equations, using computer simulations to work out the precise behavior to be expected of the network. By comparing simulations with experimental data, the computer models can be tested, refined and developed, eventually, into tools for accurate predictions of the physiological responses of healthy and diseased cells.

In Tyson's laboratory they study biological systems from a rigorous mathematical perspective, and build realistic models that help gain a deeper understanding of the physiology. Most of their work is on the mechanism of cell cycle control as seen in budding yeast, fission yeast, Xenopus embryos and egg extracts, Drosophila embryos and mammalian cells.

Tyson also worked in chemical kinetics studying oscillations, bistability, traveling' waves, and chaotic behavior in chemical reaction systems.

The unifying theme of the research is the problem of spatial and temporal organization in chemical, biochemical and biological systems. What mechanisms keep time in these various domains? How is spatial information communicated and utilized? How do the molecular regulatory mechanisms of living cells process information and initiate appropriate responses in terms of cell growth, division and death?

Tyson has published several dynamical models of cell decision making systems in cancer including Estrogen Receptor Signaling, Unfolded Protein Response (UPR) and Autophagy.

== Notable achievements and recognition ==
Tyson has worked closely with high-profile individuals within the field of cell biology. Cell Cycle Control by a Minimal Cdk Network was written by Tyson in tandem with Claude Gerard, Damien Coudreuse, and Béla Novák. The paper has been highly cited and takes a critical look at the possible origin of the eukaryotic cell and how the minimal cdk network can apply to larger complex cells like those found in humans. Tyson has been featured on television for the annual meeting of the society of cell biology in 2013, as well as being featured on the National Institute of General Medical Sciences website.

== Awards ==
- 1989-The Bellman Prize, Mathematical Biosciences
- 1992-Alumni Award for Research Excellence, VPI&SU
- 2000-Doctor honoris causa, Technical University of Budapest
- 2004-Virginia Outstanding Scientist of 2004
- 2007-Aisenstadt Chair, Centre de Recherches Mathematiques, U. Montreal
- 2009-Ziwet Lecturer, Department of Mathematics, University of Michigan
- 2009-Associate Member, Royal Academy of Sciences, Belgium
- 2011-Arthur T. Winfree Prize, Society for Mathematical Biology

== Membership and offices in professional organizations ==
- Member: American Association for the Advancement of Science, Society for Mathematical Biology, Society for Industrial and Applied Mathematics.
- President, Society for Mathematical Biology (1993–95)
- Editorial Board, Journal of Theoretical Biology (1989–present).
- Co-Chief Editor, Journal of Theoretical Biology (1995-2004).
- Co-Chair, Gordon Research Conference on Theoretical Biology and Biomathematics (1982).
- Chair, Gordon Research Conference on Oscillations and Dynamic Instabilities in Chemical Systems (1997).
- Chair, Cold Spring Harbor Symposium on Computational Cell Biology (2007, 2009)
- Director, Biological Switches and Clocks, Kavli Institute of Theoretical Physics, Santa Barabara CA (2007).
- Instructor, Cold Spring Harbor Course on Computational Cell Biology (2008, 2009).
