= Robert R. Jensen =

American mathematician

Robert Ronald Jensen (born 6 April 1949) is an American mathematician, specializing in nonlinear partial differential equations with applications to physics, engineering, game theory, and finance.

Jensen graduated in 1971 with B.S. in mathematics from Illinois Institute of Technology. He received in 1975 his Ph.D. from Northwestern University with thesis Finite difference approximation to the free boundary of a parabolic variational inequality under the supervision of Avner Friedman. Jensen was from 1975 to 1977 an assistant professor at the University of California, Los Angeles and from 1977 to 1980 a visiting assistant professor at the University of Wisconsin's Mathematics Research Center. At the University of Kentucky he was from 1977 to 1980 an assistant professor and from 1980 to 1987 an associate professor. At Loyola University Chicago he was from 1985 to 1986 a visiting associate professor and is since 1986 a full professor. At Loyola he was from 2007 to 2012 the chair of the department of mathematics and statistics.

From 1982 to 1986 Jensen held a Sloan Fellowship. He was a visiting member of Berkeley's Mathematical Sciences Research Institute in 1992, 2005, and 2013. He has given invited talks at universities and conferences around the world. In 1998 he was an Invited Speaker at the International Congress of Mathematicians in Berlin.

== Selected publications ==
- Barron, E.N; Evans, L.C; Jensen, R. (1984). "Viscosity solutions of Isaacs' equations and differential games with Lipschitz controls". Journal of Differential Equations. 53 (2): 213–233. Bibcode:1984JDE....53..213B. doi:10.1016/0022-0396(84)90040-8.
- Barron, Emmanuel Nicholas; Jensen, Robert (1986). "The Pontryagin maximum principle from dynamic programming and viscosity solutions to first-order partial differential equations". Transactions of the American Mathematical Society. 298 (2): 635. doi:10.1090/S0002-9947-1986-0860384-4.
- Jensen, R.; Lions, P.-L.; Souganidis, P. E. (1988). "A uniqueness result for viscosity solutions of second order fully nonlinear partial differential equations". Proceedings of the American Mathematical Society. 102 (4): 975. doi:10.1090/S0002-9939-1988-0934877-2.
- Jensen, Robert (1988). "The maximum principle for viscosity solutions of fully nonlinear second order partial differential equations". Archive for Rational Mechanics and Analysis. 101 (1): 1–27. Bibcode:1988ArRMA.101....1J. doi:10.1007/BF00281780. S2CID 5776251.
- Jensen, Robert (1989). "Uniqueness Criteria for Viscosity Solutions of Fully Nonlinear Elliptic Partial Differential Equations". Indiana University Mathematics Journal. 38 (3): 629–667. doi:10.1512/iumj.1989.38.38030. JSTOR 24895404.
- Barron, E. N.; Jensen, R. (1989). "Total risk aversion, stochastic optimal control, and differential games". Applied Mathematics & Optimization. 19: 313–327. doi:10.1007/BF01448203. S2CID 120524020.
- Barron, E. N.; Jensen, R. (1990). "Semicontinuous Viscosity Solutions for Hamilton–Jacobi Equations with Convex Hamiltonians". Communications in Partial Differential Equations. 15 (12): 293–309. doi:10.1080/03605309908820745.
- Barron, E. N.; Jensen, R. (1991). "Optimal control and semicontinuous viscosity solutions". Proceedings of the American Mathematical Society. 113 (2): 397. doi:10.1090/S0002-9939-1991-1076572-8.
- Jensen, Robert (1993). "Uniqueness of Lipschitz extensions: Minimizing the sup norm of the gradient". Archive for Rational Mechanics and Analysis. 123 (1): 51–74. Bibcode:1993ArRMA.123...51J. doi:10.1007/BF00386368. S2CID 92981091.
- Bardi, Martino; Jensen, Robert (2002). "A Geometric Characterization of Viable Sets for Controlled Degenerate Diffusions". Set-Valued Analysis. 10 (2/3): 129–141. doi:10.1023/A:1016596318432. S2CID 118303784.
- Barron, E. N.; Evans, L. C.; Jensen, R. (2008). "The infinity Laplacian, Aronsson's equation and their generalizations". Transactions of the American Mathematical Society. 360: 77–102. doi:10.1090/S0002-9947-07-04338-3.
- Jensen, Robert R.; Goebel, Rafal; Barron, Emmanuel N. (2012). "The quasiconvex envelope through first-order partial differential equations which characterize quasiconvexity of nonsmooth functions". Discrete and Continuous Dynamical Systems - Series B. 17 (6): 1693–1706. doi:10.3934/dcdsb.2012.17.1693.
