= Trachette Jackson =

American mathematician

- Born: July 24, 1972 (age 54); Monroe, Louisiana
- Education: University of Washington (Ph.D.); Arizona State University
- Scientific career
- Fields: Mathematical oncology
- Workplaces: University of Michigan, University of Minnesota, Duke University
- Thesis: Mathematical Models in Two-Step Cancer Chemotherapy (1998)
- Doctoral advisor: James D. Murray
- Notable students: Kim Jae Kyoung

Trachette Levon Jackson (born July 24, 1972) is an American mathematician who is a professor of mathematics at the University of Michigan and is known for work in mathematical oncology. She uses many different approaches, including continuous and discrete mathematical models, numerical simulations, and experiments to study tumor growth and treatment. Specifically, her lab is interested in "molecular pathways associated with intratumoral angiogenesis," "cell-tissue interactions associated with tumor-induced angiogenesis," and "tumor heterogeneity and cancer stem cells."

== Education and career ==
Jackson's parents were in the military and traveled frequently through her childhood; as a teenager, she lived in Mesa, Arizona. There, in a summer calculus course, her talent for mathematics brought her to the attention of Arizona State University mathematics professor Joaquín Bustoz, Jr. She went on to undergraduate studies at ASU, originally intending to study engineering, but she was steered to mathematics by Bustoz. From there, her interest in pure math developed into an interest in mathematical biology when she attended a talk by her future PhD advisor, James D. Murray, on the mathematics of pattern formation and "how the leopard got its spots." She graduated in 1994, and she earned her MS and PhD at the University of Washington in 1996 and 1998. After postdoctoral research at the University of Minnesota, Environmental Protection Agency, and Duke University, she joined the University of Michigan faculty in 2000, and she was promoted to full professor in 2008.

== Awards and recognition ==
She was awarded a Sloan Research Fellowship in 2003, becoming the second African-American woman after Kathleen Adebola Okikiolu to become a Sloan Fellow in mathematics. She won a James S. McDonnell 21st Century Scientist Grant in 2005, the Etta Z. Falconer award in 2006, and the Blackwell-Tapia Prize in 2010. In 2006, In 2017, she was selected as a fellow of the Association for Women in Mathematics in the inaugural class. Jackson's work also earned her recognition by Mathematically Gifted & Black as a Black History Month 2017 Honoree. She was named a SIAM Fellow in the 2021 class of fellows, "for innovative contributions to mathematical modeling in cancer biology and for the advancement of underrepresented minorities in science". In 2021, she was awarded the University Diversity and Social Transformation Professorship at the University of Michigan, in recognition of her "extraordinary commitment to increasing opportunities for girls, women, and underrepresented minority students in STEM, through her teaching and leadership."
