= Heiko Enderling =

German American researcher

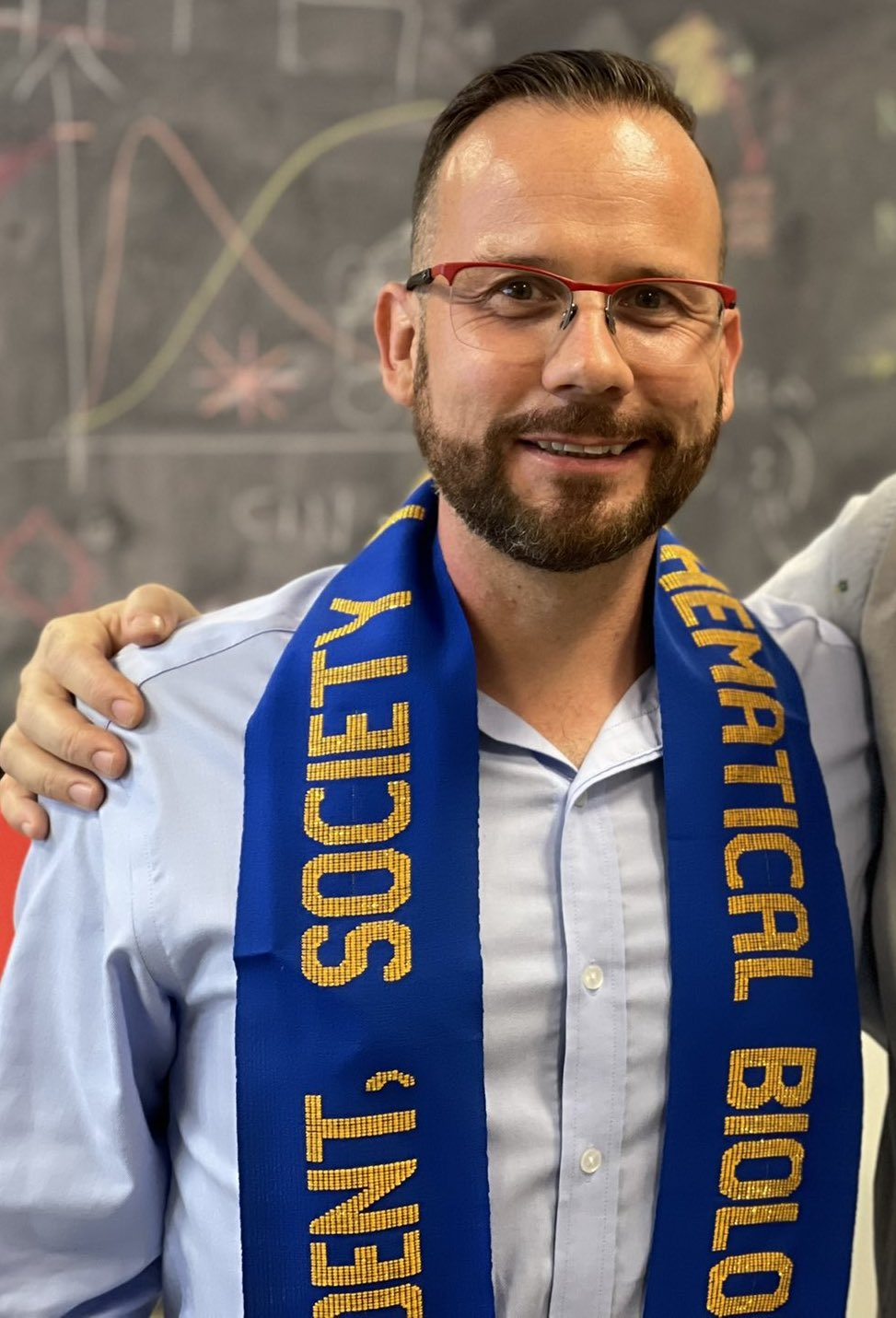
Enderling in 2021

Heiko Enderling is a German-American mathematical biologist and mathematical oncologist known for his work in quantitative personalized oncology. He is Professor in the Department of Radiation Oncology at The University of Texas MD Anderson Cancer Center, where he directs the Computational Modeling in Radiation Oncology Program and co-leads the Computational Modeling for Precision Medicine focus within the Institute for Data Science in Oncology. His research integrates mathematical modeling, systems biology, and clinical data to create predictive tools and digital twins for cancer therapy.

He is a Senior Member in the Department of Integrated Mathematical Oncology at Moffitt Cancer Center, editor of the Bulletin of Mathematical Biology, and president of the Society for Mathematical Biology (2021–2023).

== Education and early career ==
Enderling studied computervisualistik, a discipline that combines computer science, visualization, and medicine, at Otto-von-Guericke University Magdeburg in Germany, where he earned his Diplom-Ingenieur degree in 2003.

He pursued doctoral studies at the University of Dundee in Scotland, completing a Ph.D. in Mathematical Biology in 2006 under the supervision of Mark Chaplain, Glenn Rowe, and Alexander Anderson.

His dissertation, Mathematical modelling of breast tumour development, treatment and recurrence, explored computational methods for simulating tumor growth and recurrence following therapy, especially external beam radiotherapy and targeted intraoperative radiotherapy (Targit).

After his doctorate, Enderling conducted postdoctoral research at Tufts University's Center for Cancer Systems Biology at St. Elizabeth's Medical Center in Boston.

During this time, he developed mathematical models of cancer stem cell dynamics and radiation response, research that challenged existing assumptions and helped shape his later focus on tumor heterogeneity and radiotherapy resistance.

== Academic career ==
Following his postdoctoral work, Enderling joined Tufts University as an Assistant Professor, serving there from 2010 to 2013.In 2013, he moved to the Moffitt Cancer Center in Tampa, Florida, where he became a Senior Member in the Department of Integrated Mathematical Oncology. At Moffitt, he established the Quantitative Personalized Oncology laboratory, advancing the integration of mathematical and computational modeling into cancer research and prospective clinical trials.

In 2023, Enderling joined The University of Texas MD Anderson Cancer Center as Professor of Radiation Oncology. At MD Anderson Cancer Center, he founded and directs the Computational Modeling in Radiation Oncology Program and assumed a leadership role in the Institute for Data Science in Oncology, helping to build infrastructure for the development and clinical application of digital twin technologies.

Enderling was named a Centennial Postdoctoral Fellow of the American Association for Cancer Research in 2008, and Fellow of the Society for Mathematical Biology in 2021.

== Research ==
Enderling's work focuses on computational modeling of tumor growth, immune interactions, and therapy response with specific focus on radiation therapy. He is a leading advocate for digital twins in oncology, which are virtual patient avatars updated with real-time clinical data to predict treatment outcomes and guide adaptive therapy.

His models, inspired in part by hurricane forecasting methods, aim to reduce the "cone of uncertainty" in clinical predictions by integrating patient-specific imaging, molecular, and clinical data.

At Moffitt Cancer Center, his lab pioneered the use of mathematical models to study the dynamics of cancer–immune interactions and optimize immunotherapy. He deployed approaches such as phase plane analysis to characterize nonlinear relationships between tumor and immune cells, identifying pre-treatment tumor-immune ecosystems that separate remission from recurrence.

Enderling's work has also influenced clinical practice. Collaborating with clinicians, his group contributed to trials that used mathematical modeling to inform patient-specific radiation doses that improve response for high-risk patients. More recently, he has advanced digital twin technologies that combine immunotherapy, chemotherapy, and radiation data with computational models to further personalize treatment strategies.

A cornerstone of Enderling's research is developing standards for model calibration, validation, and predictive performance analysis to make predictive modeling fit-for-purpose for clinical translation. He is known for developing most parsimonious mathematical models that can be calibrated with routinely collected clinical data to ensure identifiability and prediction accuracy.

Beyond his research, Enderling has been active in building educational programs that bridge mathematics and oncology. After joining Moffitt in 2013, he collaborated with Dartmouth mathematician Dorothy Wallace to establish a semester-long program that brings Dartmouth math majors to Moffitt to study mathematical oncology. Since 2018, students in this program have spent eight weeks combining coursework in applied mathematics with mentored research in cancer modeling, producing independent projects presented at the end of the program. At the graduate level, he co-developed and served as founding director of the University of South Florida / Moffitt Cancer Center PhD program in Integrated Mathematical Oncology.

In addition to university-level training, Enderling helped launch HIP-IMO (High School Internship Program in Integrated Mathematical Oncology), an eight-week summer program for high school juniors and seniors. HIP-IMO introduces students to cancer biology, computational modeling, and computer programming, offering early exposure to interdisciplinary research careers.

== Recognition ==
In 2008, Enderling received the American Association for Cancer Research Centennial Postdoctoral Fellowship Award, which supported his pioneering studies in cancer stem cell modeling. He has continued to secure major research funding, including grants from the National Institutes of Health to support the translation of computational modeling into patient-specific predictions.

He was elected a Fellow of the Society for Mathematical Biology in 2021 and served as its President from 2021 to 2023. He is also a managing editor of BMC Radiation Oncology and contributes to advancing interdisciplinary research at the interface of mathematics, computation, and oncology.

== Selected publications ==
- Brady, Renee; Nagy, John D.; Gerke, Travis A.; Zhang, Tian; Wang, Andrew Z.; Zhang, Jingsong; Gatenby, Robert A.; Enderling, Heiko (2019-05-02). "Prostate-Specific Antigen Dynamics Predict Individual Responses to Intermittent Androgen Deprivation". bioRxiv 10.1101/624866.
- Caudell, Jimmy J; Torres-Roca, Javier F; Gillies, Robert J; Enderling, Heiko; Kim, Sungjune; Rishi, Anupam; Moros, Eduardo G; Harrison, Louis B (2017). "The future of personalised radiotherapy for head and neck cancer". The Lancet Oncology. 18 (5): e266–e273. doi:10.1016/s1470-2045(17)30252-8. ISSN 1470-2045. PMC 7771279. PMID 28456586.
- Zahid, Mohammad U.; Mohsin, Nuverah; Mohamed, Abdallah S.R.; Caudell, Jimmy J.; Harrison, Louis B.; Fuller, Clifton D.; Moros, Eduardo G.; Enderling, Heiko (2021). "Forecasting Individual Patient Response to Radiation Therapy in Head and Neck Cancer With a Dynamic Carrying Capacity Model". International Journal of Radiation Oncology*Biology*Physics. 111 (3): 693–704. Bibcode:2021IJROB.111..693Z. doi:10.1016/j.ijrobp.2021.05.132. ISSN 0360-3016. PMC 8463501. PMID 34102299.
- Brady, Renee; Enderling, Heiko (2019-07-23). "Mathematical Models of Cancer: When to Predict Novel Therapies, and When Not to". Bulletin of Mathematical Biology. 81 (10): 3722–3731. doi:10.1007/s11538-019-00640-x. ISSN 0092-8240. PMC 6764933. PMID 31338741.
- Prokopiou, Sotiris; Moros, Eduardo G.; Poleszczuk, Jan; Caudell, Jimmy; Torres-Roca, Javier F.; Latifi, Kujtim; Lee, Jae K.; Myerson, Robert; Harrison, Louis B.; Enderling, Heiko (2015-07-31). "A proliferation saturation index to predict radiation response and personalize radiotherapy fractionation". Radiation Oncology. 10 (1) 159. Bibcode:2015RadOn..10..159P. doi:10.1186/s13014-015-0465-x. ISSN 1748-717X. PMC 4521490. PMID 26227259.
- Bekker, Rebecca A; Zahid, Mohammad U; Binning, Jennifer M; Spring, Bryan Q; Hwu, Patrick; Pilon-Thomas, Shari; Enderling, Heiko (2022). "Rethinking the immunotherapy numbers game". Journal for ImmunoTherapy of Cancer. 10 (7) e005107. doi:10.1136/jitc-2022-005107. ISSN 2051-1426. PMC 9260835. PMID 35793871.
- Prokopiou, Sotiris; Moros, Eduardo G.; Poleszczuk, Jan; Caudell, Jimmy; Torres-Roca, Javier F.; Latifi, Kujtim; Lee, Jae K.; Myerson, Robert; Harrison, Louis B.; Enderling, Heiko (2015-07-31). "A proliferation saturation index to predict radiation response and personalize radiotherapy fractionation". Radiation Oncology. 10 (1) 159. Bibcode:2015RadOn..10..159P. doi:10.1186/s13014-015-0465-x. ISSN 1748-717X. PMC 4521490. PMID 26227259.
- Enderling, Heiko; Anderson, Alexander R.A.; Chaplain, Mark A.J.; Beheshti, Afshin; Hlatky, Lynn; Hahnfeldt, Philip (2009-11-11). "Paradoxical Dependencies of Tumor Dormancy and Progression on Basic Cell Kinetics". Cancer Research. 69 (22): 8814–8821. doi:10.1158/0008-5472.can-09-2115. ISSN 0008-5472. PMID 19887613.
- Ghaffari Laleh, Narmin; Loeffler, Chiara Maria Lavinia; Grajek, Julia; Staňková, Kateřina; Pearson, Alexander T.; Muti, Hannah Sophie; Trautwein, Christian; Enderling, Heiko; Poleszczuk, Jan; Kather, Jakob Nikolas (2022-02-04). "Classical mathematical models for prediction of response to chemotherapy and immunotherapy". PLOS Computational Biology. 18 (2) e1009822. Bibcode:2022PLSCB..18E9822G. doi:10.1371/journal.pcbi.1009822. ISSN 1553-7358. PMC 8903251. PMID 35120124.
- Gao, Xuefeng; McDonald, J. Tyson; Hlatky, Lynn; Enderling, Heiko (2012-12-26). "Acute and Fractionated Irradiation Differentially Modulate Glioma Stem Cell Division Kinetics". Cancer Research. 73 (5): 1481–1490. doi:10.1158/0008-5472.can-12-3429. ISSN 0008-5472. PMC 3594421. PMID 23269274.
- Alfonso, Juan C.L.; Grass, G. Daniel; Welsh, Eric; Ahmed, Kamran A.; Teer, Jamie K.; Pilon-Thomas, Shari; Harrison, Louis B.; Cleveland, John L.; Mulé, James J.; Eschrich, Steven A.; Torres-Roca, Javier F.; Enderling, Heiko (2021). "Tumor-immune ecosystem dynamics define an individual Radiation Immune Score to predict pan-cancer radiocurability". Neoplasia. 23 (11): 1110–1122. doi:10.1016/j.neo.2021.09.003. ISSN 1476-5586. PMC 8502777. PMID 34619428.
- Enderling, Heiko; Wolkenhauer, Olaf (2021-01-15). "Are all models wrong?". Computational and Systems Oncology. 1 (1) e1008. doi:10.1002/cso2.1008. ISSN 2689-9655. PMC 7880041. PMID 33585835.
- Poleszczuk, Jan T.; Luddy, Kimberly A.; Prokopiou, Sotiris; Robertson-Tessi, Mark; Moros, Eduardo G.; Fishman, Mayer; Djeu, Julie Y.; Finkelstein, Steven E.; Enderling, Heiko (2023-03-30). "Data from Abscopal Benefits of Localized Radiotherapy Depend on Activated T-cell Trafficking and Distribution between Metastatic Lesions". doi.org. doi:10.1158/0008-5472.c.6507530.
- Enderling, Heiko; Chaplain, Mark A.J.; Anderson, Alexander R.A.; Vaidya, Jayant S. (2007). "A mathematical model of breast cancer development, local treatment and recurrence". Journal of Theoretical Biology. 246 (2): 245–259. Bibcode:2007JThBi.246..245E. doi:10.1016/j.jtbi.2006.12.010. PMID 17289081.
- Enderling, Heiko; Anderson, Alexander R.A.; Chaplain, Mark A.J.; Beheshti, Afshin; Hlatky, Lynn; Hahnfeldt, Philip (11 November 2009). "Paradoxical Dependencies of Tumor Dormancy and Progression on Basic Cell Kinetics". Cancer Research. 69 (22): 8814–8821. doi:10.1158/0008-5472.can-09-2115. PMID 19887613. S2CID 16251292.
- Enderling, Heiko; Chaplain, Mark (31 August 2014). "Mathematical Modeling of Tumor Growth and Treatment". Current Pharmaceutical Design. 20 (30): 4934–4940. doi:10.2174/1381612819666131125150434. hdl:10023/7710. PMID 24283955.
