= Joel D. Katz =

Canadian psychologist

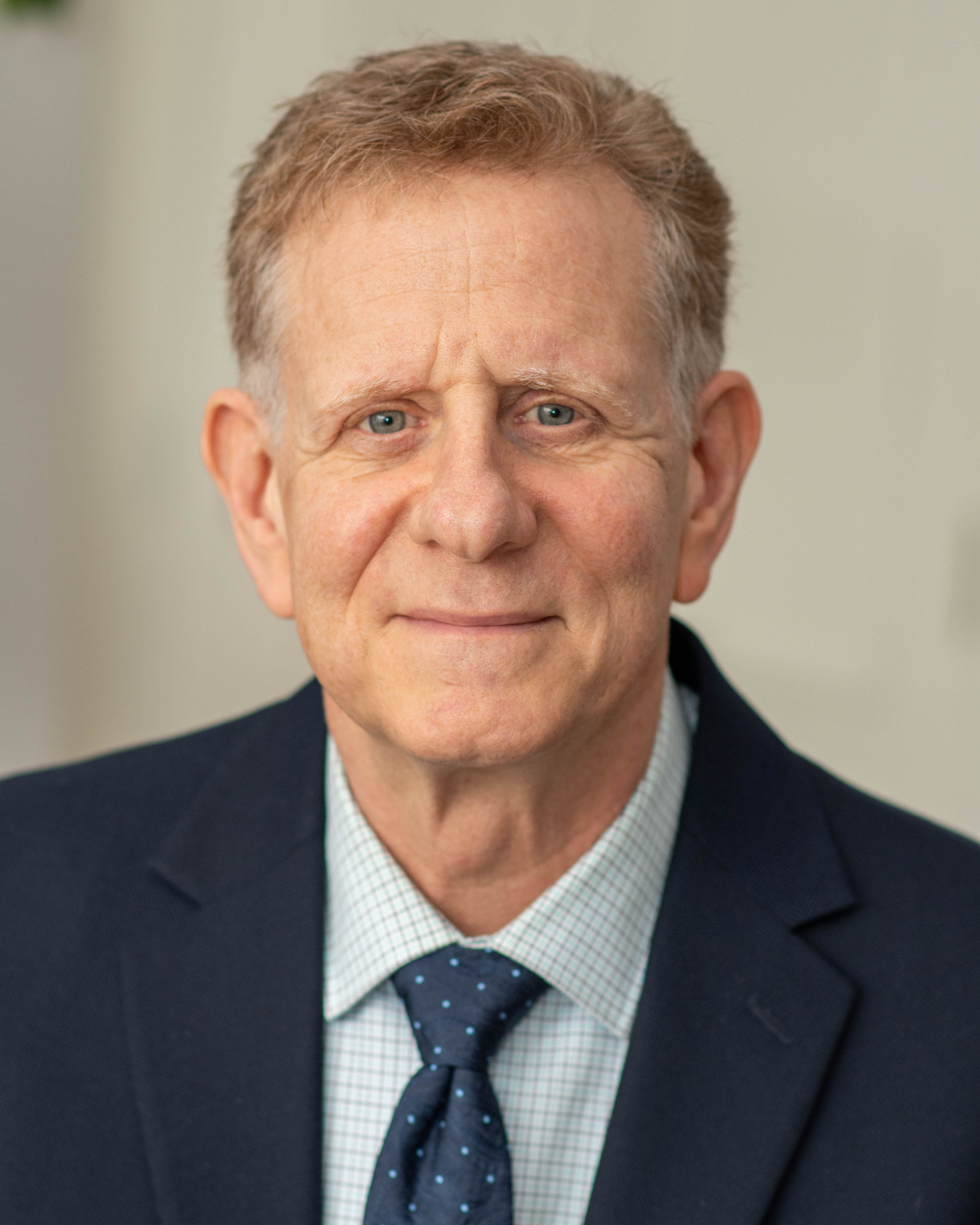
- Born: 1954 (age 71–72)
- Children: 3

Academic background
- Education: B.A., 1978, McGill University; MA., 1980, Dalhousie University; PhD., clinical psychology, 1989, McGill University
- Thesis: Painful and non-painful phantom limbs: the influence of peripheral and central factors (1989)

Academic work
- Institutions: Toronto General Hospital; The Hospital for Sick Children; Montreal General Hospital; York University; University of Toronto
- Main interests: acute pain chronic pain pain management

Joel D. Katz FCAHS (born 1954) is a Canadian psychologist and researcher. He is a Distinguished Research Professor and former, 3-term Tier 1 Canada Research Chair in Health Psychology at York University. He also serves as the Research Lead of the Transitional Pain Service in the Department of Anesthesia and Pain Management at the Toronto General Hospital and is a professor in the Department of Anesthesia at the University of Toronto.

== Early life and education ==
Katz earned his Bachelor of Arts degree from McGill University in Montreal before enrolling in Dalhousie University for his Master's degree. While at Dalhousie, he studied speech perception in infants before accepting a position at the Montreal General Hospital's Pain Center as a research assistant. While working at the Montreal General Hospital Pain Centre with the late Dr. Ronald Melzack, Katz interacted with amputees experiencing phantom pains, which he dubbed "somatosensory pain memories." This sparked his interest in pain research. He and Melzack also evaluated the efficacy of auriculotherapy in reducing phantom limb pain. He spent two years at the hospital before re-enrolling in at McGill for his doctorate under Dr. Melzack's supervision.

== Career ==
In 1990, Katz moved to Toronto where he conducted his postdoctoral work in the Departments of Psychology and Anesthesia & Pain Management at the Toronto General Hospital. While there, he co-authored a review of clinical and experimental evidence towards pain titled Contribution of central neuroplasticity to pathological pain: review of clinical and experimental evidence. He also embarked on several studies with the late Brian P. Kavanagh and other colleagues testing a hypothesis that derived from his doctoral research that when it works, pre-emptive analgesia reduces acute pain after surgery because it blocks the formation of a somatosensory memory-like mechanism in the spinal cord.

Katz joined the faculty in the Department of Psychology as a professor and Canada Research Chair in Health Psychology at York University in 2002. He co-conducted studies in pain management and control post-surgery with colleagues at the University Health Network in Toronto. Their research discovered that those who received preemptive or preventive pain control showed a reduction in pain disability within three weeks after surgery. Katz found that while regional anesthesia was successful in reducing the intensity of acute pain, there was not enough conclusive research to show that it preempted chronic pain. Katz later received the University of Toronto's Department of Anesthesia 2007 Faculty Research Award and York's 2011 Faculty Teaching Award.

In 2013, Katz co-authored a study with Gabrielle Pagé which found that children who experienced extreme and unpleasant pain post-surgery were more likely to develop moderate to severe pain within six months. Katz also led a study which used an eye-tracker device to test reaction times when people with chronic pain looked at pain-related and neutral words. Katz’s later work focused on the prevention of chronic postsurgical pain and prolonged opioid use following surgery. He and Dr. Hance Clarke co-founded the Transitional Pain Service (TPS) at Toronto General Hospital, a multidisciplinary program that integrates perioperative pain management, psychology, physiotherapy, and structured postoperative follow-up for patients at risk of persistent pain and opioid dependence. Independent reviews have discussed transitional pain services as an emerging model for bridging acute postoperative care and long-term pain management, and similar programs have subsequently been established and studied at institutions in Canada, the United States, Europe, Australia and New Zealand.

As a result, he received the Canadian Pain Society's 2013 Distinguished Career Award for "his outstanding achievements and contributions to pain research and pain management" and their 2016 Outstanding Pain Mentorship Award. That same year, Katz was renewed as a Canada Research Chair in Health Psychology and was appointed editor-in-chief of the Canadian Journal of Pain. On March 9, 2016, Katz was the recipient of the Canadian Psychological Association's Donald O. Hebb Award for Distinguished Contributions to Psychology as a Science.

At the conclusion of the 2016–17 academic year, Katz and Jonathan Edmondson were appointed Distinguished Research Professorship for their "outstanding contributions to the University through research". On September 26, 2017, Katz was named a fellow of the Canadian Academy of Health Sciences alongside Paul McDonald, Dean of the Faculty of Health at York University.

In 2018, Katz, Jane Heffernan, and Paul Ritvo worked alongside app developer ManagingLife to be the first researchers to define pain volatility through prediction models. Their analysis was published in the Journal of Medical Internet Research and found that pain management apps such as "Manage My Pain" could help shape future treatments of pain. More recently, ManagingLife developed and tested an expert-trained generative AI conversational agent, Solace, grounded in evidence-based pain psychology principles to help support people living with chronic pain. Preliminary results indicated a one-time use of Solace for approximately 30 minutes resulted in improvements in pain-related symptoms. Katz is an unpaid member of ManagingLife’s Advisory Board and provides guidance on the company’s research initiatives in his capacity as Research Director.

On April 16, 2019, Katz was appointed a Fellow of the American Psychological Association's Society of Clinical Child and Adolescent Psychology. A few months later, he was recognized by the Expertscape, an online database that ranks individuals and institutions by their expertise, as a "World Expert in postoperative pain research."

Katz received the Senior Investigator Award from the Health Psychology/Behavioral Medicine Section of the Canadian Psychological Association in 2021. In 2023, a citation analysis by Krakauer et al. published in Canadian Psychology ranked Katz in the top two percent of the most-cited clinical psychology professors among Canadian Psychological Association-accredited university departments, and in the top ten percent of male full professors.
