= Ruth Baker =

British mathematical biologist

- Occupations: Applied mathematician and mathematical biologist
- Known for: Pattern formation, morphogenesis, and the mathematical modelling of cell biology and developmental biology.

Ruth Elizabeth Baker is a British applied mathematician and mathematical biologist at the University of Oxford whose research interests include pattern formation, morphogenesis, and the mathematical modelling of cell biology and developmental biology.

== Education and career ==
Baker read mathematics at Wadham College, Oxford, and earned a doctorate (D.Phil.) at the University of Oxford in 2005. Her dissertation, Periodic Pattern Formation in Developmental Biology: A Study of the Mechanisms Involved in Somite Formation, was jointly supervised by biologist Santiago Schnell and mathematician Philip Maini, who was also the doctoral supervisor of Schnell.

After postdoctoral research in Germany, the US, and Australia, funded by a UK Research Council Junior Research Fellowship, she returned to a permanent position at Oxford. She is a professor of applied mathematics at the Mathematical Institute of the University of Oxford and a tutorial fellow in mathematics in St Hugh's College, Oxford since 2010.

== Recognition ==
Baker was a 2014 winner of the Whitehead Prize of the London Mathematical Society "for her outstanding contributions to the field of Mathematical Biology". She was awarded a Leverhulme Research Fellowship for her work in "efficient computational methods for testing biological hypotheses" in 2017.
