= Jane Heffernan =

Canadian mathematician

Academic background
- Education: B.Sc., Trent University 1996; B.Ed., Queen's University; M.Sc., PhD., University of Western Ontario
- Thesis: ''The effects of genetic drift and mutation in experimental evolution. (MSc); Transition time distributions and stochasticity in immunological models of HIV infection. (PhD)''

Academic work
- Institutions: York University

Jane Marie Heffernan is a Canadian mathematician. Her research focuses on understanding the spread and persistence of infectious diseases. She is a full professor at York University and a Tier 2 York Research Chair in Multi-Scale Quantitative Methods for Evidence-Based Health Policy. Heffernan is the director of York University's Centre for Disease Modelling (CDM), and has served on the board of directors of the Canadian Applied and Industrial Mathematics Society (CAIMS). She is also a past president (2023–25) of the Society for Mathematical Biology.

== Early life and career ==
As a youth, Heffernan decided she enjoyed studying mathematics and decided to pursue a career as a math teacher. She earned her undergraduate degree in mathematics and computer science from Trent University, graduating in 2000, before going on to do a B.Ed.degree at Queen's University, Kingston, Ontario followed by an M.Sc. and Ph.D. at the University of Western Ontario, in London, Ontario. She completed her PhD thesis - "Tradition time distributions and stochasticity in immunological model of HIV infection" - in 2006.

== Career ==
Heffernan joined the York University faculty in 2007. She was also named director of the Centre for Disease Modelling.

In 2014, Heffernan and fellow York University professor Derek Wilson co-authored a paper titled "The Undead: A Plague on Mankind or a Powerful New Tool for Epidemiological Research." In 2015, she was appointed a York Research Chair. As a result of her research in the Modelling Infection & Immunity Lab, she also won the CAIMS-PIMS Early Career Award. The next year, York University recognized her as a research leader.

In 2018, Heffernan, Joel D. Katz, and Paul Ritvo co-analyzed a pain management app that claimed to identify and forecast changes in pain experiences of users.

== Awards ==
Heffernan has received several Early Career Academic awards including the Governor General's Gold Medal (2006) while at the University of Western Ontario, an NSERC Postdoctoral Fellowship (Warwick, UK), NSERC University Faculty Award, MRI Ontario Early Researcher Award, and the Petro-Canada Young Innovators Award.

More recent awards include:

- 2022 received Trent University's Distinguished Alumni Award
- 2021 inducted into the Royal Society of Canada's College of New Scholars, Artists and Scientists
