= Nicolas Rashevsky =

Russian American mathematician

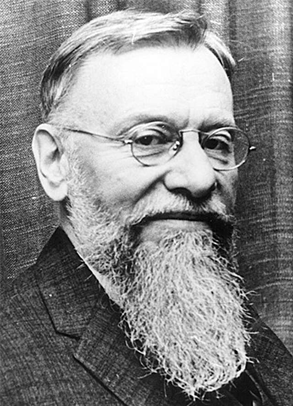
- Born: November 9, 1899; Chernigov, Russian Empire (now Chernihiv, Ukraine)
- Died: January 16, 1972 (aged 72); Holland, Michigan, United States
- Education: St. Vladimir Imperial University of Kiev, University of Chicago
- Scientific career
- Fields: Theoretical physics, Mathematical biology
- Workplaces: University of Chicago, University of Michigan
- Notable students: George Karreman, Robert Rosen, Clyde Coombs, Anatol Rapoport, Herbert A. Simon

Nicolas Rashevsky (November 9, 1899 – January 16, 1972) was an American theoretical physicist who was one of the pioneers of mathematical biology, and is also considered the father of mathematical biophysics and theoretical biology.

== Academic career ==
He studied theoretical physics at the St. Vladimir Imperial University of Kiev. He left Ukraine after the October Revolution, emigrating first to Turkey, then to Poland, France, and finally to the US in 1924.

In USA he worked at first for the Westinghouse Research Labs in Pittsburgh where he focused on the theoretical physics modeling of the cell division and the mathematics of cell fission.

He was awarded a Rockefeller Fellowship in 1934 and went to the University of Chicago to take up the appointment of assistant professor in the department of physiology. In 1938, inspired by reading On Growth and Form (1917) by D'Arcy Wentworth Thompson, he made his first major contribution by publishing his first book on Mathematical Biophysics, and then in 1939 he also founded the first mathematical biology international journal entitled The Bulletin of Mathematical Biophysics (BMB); these two essential contributions founded the field of mathematical biology, with the Bulletin of Mathematical Biology serving as the focus of contributing mathematical biologists over the last 70 years.

During the late 1930s, Rashevsky's research group was producing papers that had difficulty publishing in other journals at the time, so Rashevsky decided to found a new journal exclusively devoted to mathematical biophysics. In January 1939, he approached the editor of the journal Psychometrika, L.L. Thurstone, and formed an agreement that the new journal, the BMB, would be published as a supplement to their quarterly issues.

=== Major scientific contributions ===
In 1938 he published one of the first books on mathematical biology and mathematical biophysics entitled: "Mathematical Biophysics: Physico-Mathematical Foundations of Biology." This fundamental book was eventually published in three revised editions, the last revision appearing in two volumes in 1960. It was followed in 1940 by "Advances and applications of mathematical biology.", and in 1947 by "Mathematical theory of human relations", an approach to a mathematical model of society. In the same year he established the World' s first PhD program in mathematical biology at the University of Chicago.

In the early 1930s, Rashevsky developed the first model of neural networks. This was paraphrased in a Boolean context by his student Walter Pitts and Warren McCulloch in their 1943 paper "A Logical Calculus of the Ideas Immanent in Nervous Activity," published in Rashevsky's The Bulletin of Mathematical Biophysics in 1943. This paper subsequently became extremely influential for research on artificial intelligence and artificial neural networks.

His later efforts focused on the topology of biological systems, the formulation of fundamental principles in biology, relational biology, set theory and propositional logic formulation of the hierarchical organization of organisms and human societies. In the second half of the 1960s, he introduced the concept of "organismic sets" that provided a unified framework for physics, biology and sociology. This was subsequently developed by other authors as organismic supercategories and Complex Systems Biology.

=== Rashevsky's most notable students ===
Some of Rashevsky's most outstanding PhD students who earned their doctorate under his supervision were: George Karreman, Herbert Daniel Landahl, Clyde Coombs, Robert Rosen and Anatol Rapoport. In 1948, Anatol Rapoport took over Rashevsky's course in mathematical biology, so that Rashevsky could teach mathematical sociology instead.

=== Administrative and political obstacles ===
However, his more advanced ideas and abstract relational biology concepts found little support in the beginning amongst practicing experimental or molecular biologists, although current developments in complex systems biology clearly follow in his footsteps.

In 1954 the budget for his Committee of Mathematical Biology was drastically cut; however, this was at least in part politically imposed, rather than scientifically, motivated. Thus, the subsequent University of Chicago administration—notably represented by the genetics Nobel laureate George Wells Beadle— who reversed in the 1960s the previous position and quadrupled the financial support for Rashevsky's Committee for Mathematical Biology research activities ("Reminiscences of Nicolas Rashevsky." by Robert Rosen, written in late 1972).

There was later however a fall out between the retiring Nicolas Rashevsky and the University of Chicago president over the successor to the Chair of the Committee of Mathematical Biology; Nicolas Rashevsky strongly supported Dr. Herbert Landahl-his first PhD student to graduate in Mathematical Biophysics, whereas the president wished to appoint a certain US biostatistician. The result was Rashevsky's move to the University of Michigan in Ann Arbor, Michigan, and his taking ownership of the well-funded "Bulletin of Mathematical Biophysics".

=== Formation of Mathematical Biology, Inc. ===
He also formed in 1969 a non-profit organization, "Mathematical Biology, Incorporated", which was to be the precursor of "The Society for Mathematical Biology", with the purpose of "dissemination of information regarding Mathematical Biology".

In his later years, after 1968, he became again very active in relational biology and held, as well as Chaired, in 1970 the first international "Symposium of Mathematical Biology" at Toledo, Ohio, in USA with the help of his former PhD student, Dr. Anthony Bartholomay, who has become the chairman of the first Department of Mathematical Medicine at Ohio University. The meeting was sponsored by Mathematical Biology, Inc.

=== Final quest for principles of biology ===
Rashevsky was greatly influenced and inspired both by Herbert Spencer's book on the Principles of Biology (1898), and also by J. H. Woodger `axiomatic (Mendelian) genetics', to launch his own search and quest for biological principles, and also to formulate mathematically precise principles and axioms of biology. He then developed his own highly original approach to address the fundamental question of What is Life? that another theoretical physicist, Erwin Schrödinger, had asked before him from the narrower viewpoint of quantum theory in biology.

He wished to reach this `holy grail' of (theoretical/ mathematical) biology, but his heavy work load during the late 1960s—despite his related health problems—took its toll, and finally prevented him in 1972 from reaching his ultimate goal. Rashevsky's relational approach represents a radical departure from reductionistic approaches, and it has greatly influenced the work of his student Robert Rosen.

== Biography ==
In 1917, Nicolas Rashevsky joined the White Russian Navy and in 1920 he and his wife, Countess Emily had to flee for their lives to Constantinople where he taught at the American College. In 1921 they moved to Prague where he taught both special and general relativity.

From Prague, he moved in the 1930s to Paris, France, and then to New York, Pittsburgh and Chicago, USA. His life has been dedicated to the science that he founded, Mathematical Biology, and his wife Emily was very supportive and appreciative of his scientific efforts, accompanying him at the scientific meetings that he either initiated or attended.

He was a tall man with a slight Eastern European accent and remained cognitively active until his death from coronary artery disease in 1972. His generosity has been noted by former associates and visitors. As Chief Editor of BMB, he had a policy of assisting authors with the presentation of their papers and providing suggestions on submissions.

His suggested detailed changes, additions and further developments were like a real `gold mine' for the submitting authors. He managed to stay aloof of all science `politics' most of the time, even in very adverse circumstances such as those during the McCarthy era when completely unfounded political accusations were made about one or two members of his close research group. Not unlike another American theoretical physicist Robert Oppenheimer, he then had much to lose for his loyal support of the wrongly accused researcher in his group.

== Works ==
- Physico-mathematical aspects of Excitation and Conduction in Nerves., Cold Springs Harbor Symposia on Quantitative Biology.IV: Excitation Phenomena., 1936, p.90.
- Mathematical Biophysics:Physico-Mathematical Foundations of Biology. Univ. of Chicago Press. : Chicago Press, 1938/1948 (2nd ed.).
- Mathematical Theory of Human Relations: An Approach to Mathematical Biology of Social Phenomena. Bloomington, ID: Principia Press, 1947/1949 (2nd ed.)
- Topology and life: In search of general mathematical principles in biology and sociology. Bulletin of Mathematical Biophysics 16 (1954): 317–348.
- Proceedings of the International School of Physics "Enrico Fermi", Course 16, Physico-Mathematical Aspects of Biology. : Academic Press, 1964
- Some Medical Aspects of Mathematical Biology. Springfield, IL: Charles C. Thomas, 1964
- The Representation of Organisms in Terms of Predicates, Bulletin of Mathematical Biophysics 27 (1965): 477–491.
- Outline of a Unified Approach to Physics, Biology and Sociology., Bulletin of Mathematical Biophysics 31 (1969): 159–198.
- Looking at History through Mathematics, 1972
- Organismic Sets., William Clowes & Sons., London, Beccles and Cochester, 1972.

== Notes and references ==
The article also incorporates additional data from planetphysics.org; furthermore, both external entries are original, contributed objects in the public domain.
