= Marty Golubitsky =

American mathematician

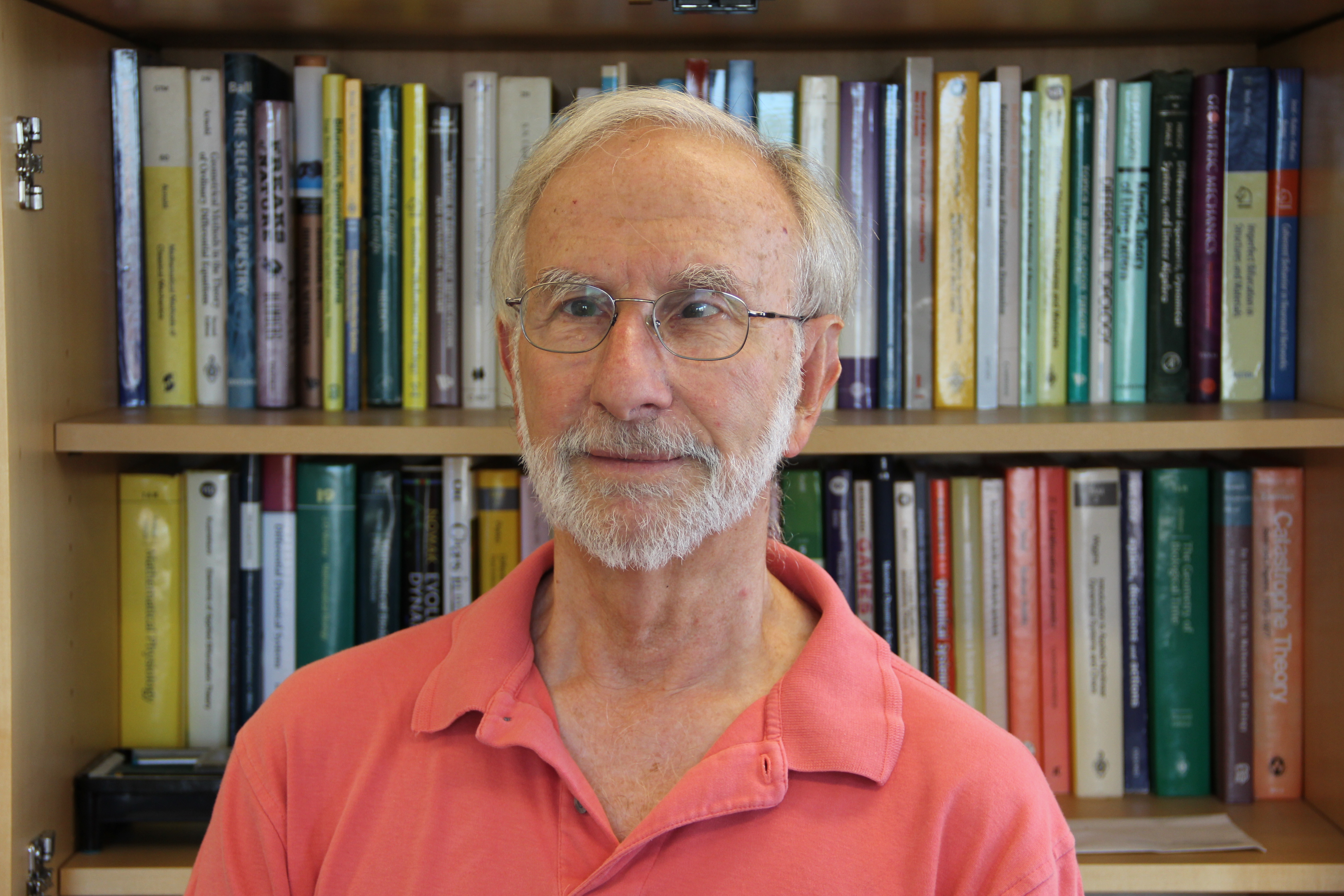
- Marty Golubitsky at the Mathematical Biosciences Institute, 2016
- Born: April 5, 1945 (age 81); Philadelphia, Pennsylvania, US
- Education: University of Pennsylvania, MIT
- Occupation: Mathematician
- Scientific career
- Workplaces: University of Nice Sophia Antipolis; Duke University; Ohio State University; Mathematical Biosciences Institute; Rice University; University of Houston; University of Minnesota; University of Toronto; Fields Institute; Newton Institute; Trinity College

Martin Aaron Golubitsky is an American Distinguished professor of mathematics at Ohio State University and the former director of the Mathematical Biosciences Institute.

== Biography ==
=== Education ===
Marty Golubitsky was born on April 5, 1945, in Philadelphia, Pennsylvania. He graduated with bachelor's degree in 1966 from the University of Pennsylvania and the same year got his master's there as well. He obtained his Ph.D. from Massachusetts Institute of Technology in 1970 where his advisor was Victor Guillemin.

=== Career ===
==== Career ====
From 1974 to 1979, he taught at Queens College, at Arizona State University until 1983 and then at the University of Houston until 2008. From 2008 to 2016 he served as the director of the Mathematical Biosciences Institute at Ohio State University where he retains a distinguished professorship in mathematics. He is a member of the American Association for the Advancement of Science, American Mathematical Society, Association for Women in Mathematics and the Society for Industrial and Applied Mathematics. He was the president of the Society for Industrial and Applied Mathematics (SIAM) 2005–2006. In 2012 he became an inaugural fellow of the American Mathematical Society. and in 2009 a SIAM Fellow.

==== Visiting ====
From January 1980 to June of the same year he worked at University of Nice Sophia Antipolis as a visiting professor and then from September to December of the next year worked at the Duke University. Following that he worked at the University of California, Berkeley, with the same position which lasted him for two months in summer of 1982 and then from January to June 1989 he worked at the Institute for Mathematics and Applications, a division of the University of Minnesota. He continued to hold that position even four years later when from January to June 1993 he was working at the division of University of Waterloo called Fields Institute. From August to November 2005 he worked at both Newton Institute and Trinity College in Cambridge and then from January to June 2006 worked at the University of Toronto as a distinguished professor. As of July 2005 he works as an adjunct professor at the Computational and Applied Mathematics division of Rice University.

== Publications ==
In 1992, he and Ian Stewart wrote a book called Fearful Symmetry: Is God a Geometer? which was published by Blackwell Publishers in Oxford. In 1994 it was translated into Dutch by Hans van Cuijlenborg where it came out under a title of Turings tijger by Epsilon Uitgaven in Utrecht. In 1995 the same work was translated into Italian by Libero Sosio as Terribili simmetrie: Dio è un geometra? and was published in Turin, Italy. His second book, on which he worked with M. Field called Symmetry in Chaos: A Search for Pattern in Mathematics, Art, and Nature was released by Oxford University Press, in 1992 and was followed by German translation by Micha Lotrovsky in 1993 and the French one the same year by Christian Jeanmougin which was published by Inter´Editions in Paris. Besides books he also has numerous peer-reviewed articles and even was a co-editor of the Multiparameter Bifurcation Theory, Contemporary Mathematics which was published by Association for Computing Machinery in 1986.
