= Anna Marciniak-Czochra =

Polish mathematician

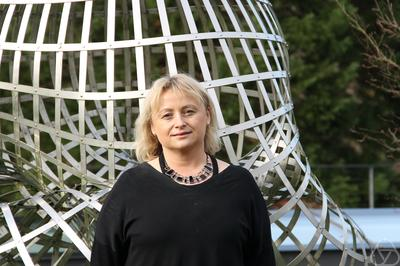
- Marciniak-Czochra at Oberwolfach in 2017
- Born: 11 March 1974 (age 52); Lublin, Poland
- Education: University of Warsaw; Heidelberg University
- Occupations: Applied mathematician and mathematical biologist

Anna Marciniak-Czochra (born 11 March 1974 in Lublin, Poland) is a Polish applied mathematician and mathematical biologist. Since 2011 she has been a professor of applied mathematics in the Faculty of Mathematics and Computer Sciences at Heidelberg University.

She earned her Master of Science in mathematics 1998 at the University of Warsaw, her PhD (with honors) in Mathematics 2004 at the Heidelberg University.

Since 2016 she has been leader of applied analysis and modelling in biosciences at the Heidelberg University.
