= Mathematical Biosciences Institute =

Educational institution in Ohio, US

- Established: 2002; 24 years ago
- Affiliations: Ohio State University
- Director: Janet Best, Laura Kubatko
- Location: 1735 Neil Ave, Columbus, Columbus, Ohio, United States; 39°59′48″N 83°00′56″W
- Website: mbi.osi.edu

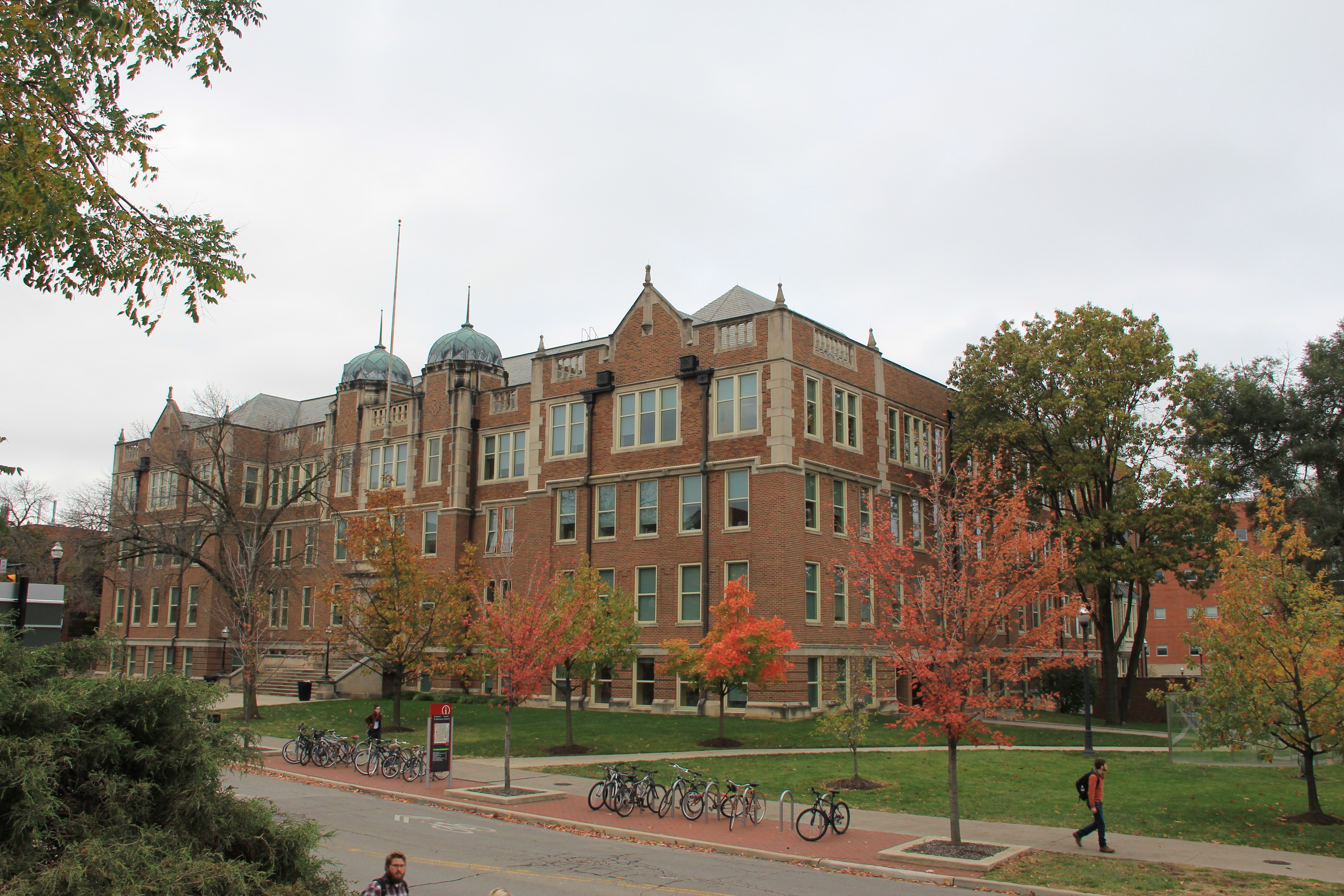
Ohio State University Jennings Hall

The Mathematical Biosciences Institute (MBI) was an institution of higher learning affiliated with the Ohio State University in Columbus, Ohio. MBI received major funding from the National Science Foundation.

== History ==
Under the leadership of founding director Avner Friedman, MBI opened in September 2002, holding its first workshop, hosting its first visiting researchers, and starting its first cohort of postdocs in that month. MBI holds 10–12 scientific workshops each year, and hosts about 25 postdoctoral and visiting researchers in residence at any given time. Through its collective events and programs, MBI draws over 1000 visits by researchers in the broadly defined area of mathematical biology throughout the year. MBI's long term planning is overseen by its Directorate and its Board of Trustees, while its scientific activities are overseen by its Directorate and its Scientific Advisory Committee.

== MBI programs ==
=== Workshops ===
MBI organizes Emphasis Semesters consisting of three or four week-long workshops. Emphasis Semesters are organized around selected themes which have included Mathematical Neuroscience, Cancer and Its Environment, and Analysis of Complex Data in Biological Systems. Outside of Emphasis Semesters, Current Topic Workshops focus on emerging topics in the mathematical biosciences. Most of the institute's programs are conducted on The Ohio State University campus, but MBI also sponsors conferences and workshops at its academic Institute Partners. MBI accepts proposals for future programs.

=== Postdoctoral fellows ===
MBI postdoctoral fellows engage in an integrated program of tutorials, working seminars, workshops, and interactions with their mathematical and bioscience mentors. These activities are geared toward providing the tools to pursue an independent research program with an emphasis on collaborative research in the mathematical biosciences.

=== Long-term visitors ===
MBI has a program of support for visitors to spend an extended period of time in residence. During their time at the institute, which can range from a few weeks to many months, visitors can focus on their research while benefiting from participation in MBI workshops and seminars and collaborating with others in the MBI community. Visitors also participate in the Visiting Lecturer Program through which they can share their research.

=== Early Career Awards ===
Early Career Awards are aimed at non-tenured scientists who have continuing employment and who hold a doctorate in any of the mathematical, statistical and computational sciences, or in any of the biological, medical, and related sciences. Award winners are supported to spend a period of time in residence at MBI.

=== Education programs ===
The MBI Summer Undergraduate Research Program aims to give outstanding undergraduate students the opportunity to conduct meaningful research in the mathematical biosciences. MBI works with partner institutions to facilitate an eight-week Research Experience for Undergraduates (REU), supported by the National Science Foundation. Students also participate in a mathematical biology bootcamp at MBI and present their completed research at the Undergraduate Capstone Conference.

MBI co-sponsors a rotating annual summer school with the National Institute for Mathematical and Biological Synthesis (NIMBioS) and Centre for Applied Mathematics in Bioscience and Medicine (CAMBAM). The school brings together graduate students in mathematics, biology, and related fields to engage in a focused course of study on a current topic in mathematical biology.

=== Outreach ===
Past programs include the workshop for Women Advancing Mathematical Biology, Workshop for Young Researchers in Mathematical Biology, Blackwell Tapia Conference, and the Science Sundays lecture series.

=== Institute Partners ===
The MBI Institute Partner (IP) program promotes the involvement of the international math biosciences community in MBI programs. Institute Partners receive direct benefits and opportunities enabling them to support, guide and participate in MBI research and education programs.

== List of directors ==
Image	Name	Timespan
	Avner Friedman	2002-2008
	Marty Golubitsky	2008-2016
	Grzegorz Rempala	2016–2017 (interim)
	Janet Best, Kate Calder	2018–2019
	Janet Best, Laura Kubatko	2019–present
