= Society for Mathematical Biology =

The Society for Mathematical Biology (SMB) is an international association co-founded in 1972 in the United States by George Karreman, Herbert Daniel Landahl and (initially chaired) by Anthony Bartholomay for the furtherance of joint scientific activities between Mathematics and Biology research communities. The society publishes the Bulletin of Mathematical Biology, as well as the quarterly SMB newsletter.

== History ==
The Society for Mathematical Biology (SMB) emerged and grew from the earlier school of mathematical biophysics, initiated by a pioneer of mathematical biology in the United States, Nicolas Rashevsky. Thus, the roots of SMB go back to the publication in 1939 of the first international journal of mathematical biology, originally entitled "The Bulletin of Mathematical Biophysics"—which was founded by Nicolas Rashevsky, and which is now published by SMB under the name of "Bulletin of Mathematical Biology". Professor Rashevsky also founded in 1969 the non-profit organization "Mathematical Biology, Incorporated"—the precursor of SMB. Another notable member of the University of Chicago school of mathematical biology was Anatol Rapoport whose major interests were in developing basic concepts in the related area of mathematical sociology, who cofounded the Society for General Systems Research and became the president of the latter society in 1965. Herbert D. Landahl was initially also a member of Rashevsky's school of mathematical biology, and became the second president of SMB in the 1980s; both Herbert Landahl and Robert Rosen from Rashevsky's research group were focused on dynamical systems approaches to complex systems biology, with the latter researcher becoming in 1980 the president of the Society for General Systems Research.

== Leadership ==
The Society for Mathematical Biology is governed by its Officers and Board of Directors, elected by the membership. Current SMB President is Reinhard Laubenbacher (University of Florida), and Past-President serving as vice president is Jane Heffernan (York University). SMB secretary is Brandilyn Stigler (Southern Methodist University), and treasurer is Claus Kadelka (Iowa State University). The current Board of Directors is composed of Jessica Conway (Penn State University), Padmini Rangamani (University of California San Diego), Amina Eladdadi (The College of St Rose), Jennifer Flegg (University of Melbourne), Robyn Araujo (University of Melbourne), and Richard Bertram (Florida State University).

SMB presidents
| Years of service | President | Affiliation |
|---|---|---|
| 1973-1981 | George Karreman | University of Pennsylvania School of Medicine |
| 1981-1983 | Herbert Landahl | University of California, San Francisco |
| 1983-1985 | John Stephenson | National Heart Institute, National Institutes of Health |
| 1985-1987 | John Jacquez | University of Michigan Medical School |
| 1987-1989 | Simon Levin | Cornell University |
| 1989-1991 | Stuart Kauffman | Santa Fe Institute |
| 1991-1993 | Alan Perelson | Los Alamos National Laboratory |
| 1993-1995 | John J. Tyson | Virginia Polytechnic Institute and State University |
| 1995-1997 | Leah Edelstein-Keshet | University of British Columbia |
| 1997-1999 | Leon Glass | McGill University |
| 1999-2001 | Alan Hastings | University of California, Davis |
| 2001-2003 | Mark Lewis | University of Alberta |
| 2003-2005 | Lou Gross | University of Tennessee at Knoxville |
| 2005-2007 | Mark Chaplain | University of Dundee |
| 2007-2009 | Avner Friedman | Ohio State University |
| 2009-2011 | Michael Mackey | McGill University |
| 2011-2013 | Gerda de Vries | University of Alberta |
| 2013-2015 | Fred Adler | University of Utah |
| 2015-2017 | Santiago Schnell | Dartmouth College |
| 2017-2019 | Denise Kirschner | University of Michigan Medical School |
| 2019-2021 | Alexander R. A. Anderson | Moffitt Cancer Center |
| 2021-2023 | Heiko Enderling | Moffitt Cancer Center |
| 2023-2025 | Jane Heffernan | York University |
| 2025-2027 | Reinhard Laubenbacher | University of Florida |

== Research and educational activities ==
Bulletin of Mathematical Biology
- Discipline: Mathematical biology
- Language: English
- Edited by: Matthew Simpson

Publication details
- Former name: Bulletin of Mathematical Biophysics
- History: 1939–present
- Publisher: Springer Science+Business Media on behalf of the Society for Mathematical Biology
- Frequency: Monthly

Standard abbreviations
- ISO 4: Bull. Math. Biol.

Indexing
- Bulletin of Mathematical Biology
- CODEN: BMTBAP
- ISSN: 0092-8240 (print); 1522-9602 (web)
- LCCN: 75643459
- OCLC no.: 02241208
- Bulletin of Mathematical Biophysics
- ISSN: 0007-4985

Links
- Journal homepage

In addition to its research and news publications, the society supports education in: mathematical biology, mathematical biophysics, complex systems biology and theoretical biology through sponsorship of several topic-focused graduate and postdoctoral courses. To encourage and stimulate young researchers, the society awards several prizes, as well as lists regularly new open international opportunities for researchers and students in this field.

=== Bulletin of Mathematical Biology ===
The society publishes the Bulletin of Mathematical Biology. The Bulletin was founded by Nicolas Rashevsky, under the title of the Bulletin of Mathematical Biophysics, before acquiring its present title, and quickly became the classical journal in general mathematical biology and served as the principal natural publication outlet for the majority of mathematical biologists. Many classical papers have appeared in the Bulletin, and several of these are familiar to biologists. It has become an important avenue for the exchange and transmission of new ideas and approaches to biological problems and incorporates both the quantitative and qualitative aspects of mathematical models and characterizations of biological processes and systems.

Nicolas Rashevsky remained the editor of the Bulletin until his death on January 16, 1972.

Bulletin of Mathematical Biology Editor-in-Chief
| Years of service | Editor | Affiliation |
|---|---|---|
| 1939-1972 | Nicolas Rashevsky | University of Chicago University of Michigan |
| 1972-1981 | Herbert Landahl | University of California, San Francisco |
| 1982-1986 | Hugo M. Martinez | University of California, San Francisco |
| 1986-2001 | Lee A. Siegel | Weizmann Institute |
| 2002-2015 | Philip Maini | University of Oxford |
| 2016 - 2022 | Alan Hastings Reinhard Laubenbacher | University of California, Davis University of Connecticut Health |
| 2022–present | Matthew Simpson | Queensland University of Technology |

=== Annual Meetings ===
The Society holds annual meetings that are important locations for dissemination of research. The Society's website records its annual meetings going back to 2002, although of course they took place earlier due to the Society's history. The Society states on its website regarding its annual meetings: "In odd years, the Annual Meetings are generally organized in North America. In even years, the Annual Meetings are generally organized outside North America." The next annual meeting will take place jointly with the European Society for Mathematical and Theoretical Biology in Graz, Austria, in 2026.
