= Mathematical Biology =

1989 textbook by James D. Murray

Mathematical Biology I: An Introduction
- Second edition
- Author: James D. Murray
- Language: English
- Subject: Mathematical biology
- Publisher: Springer
- Publication date: 1989; Second edition in 1993; Third edition in 2002
- Publication place: United States
- Media type: Print
- Pages: 551
- ISBN: 0-387-95223-3

Mathematical Biology is a two-part monograph on mathematical biology first published in 1989 by the applied mathematician James D. Murray. It is considered to be a classic in the field and sweeping in scope.

Mathematical Biology II: Spatial Models and Biomedical Applications
- Author: James D. Murray
- Language: English
- Subject: Mathematical biology
- Publisher: Springer
- Publication date: 1989; Second edition in 1993; Third edition in 2003
- Publication place: United States
- Media type: Print
- Pages: 811
- ISBN: 0-387-95228-4

== Part I: An Introduction ==
Part I of Mathematical Biology covers population dynamics, reaction kinetics, oscillating reactions, and reaction-diffusion equations.

- Chapter 1: Continuous Population Models for Single Species
- Chapter 2: Discrete Population Models for a Single Species
- Chapter 3: Models for Interacting Populations
- Chapter 4: Temperature-Dependent Sex Determination (TSD)
- Chapter 5: Modelling the Dynamics of Marital Interaction: Divorce Prediction and Marriage Repair
- Chapter 6: Reaction Kinetics
- Chapter 7: Biological Oscillators and Switches
- Chapter 8: BZ Oscillating Reactions
- Chapter 9: Perturbed and Coupled Oscillators and Black Holes
- Chapter 10: Dynamics of Infectious Diseases
- Chapter 11: Reaction Diffusion, Chemotaxis, and Nonlocal Mechanisms
- Chapter 12: Oscillator-Generated Wave Phenomena
- Chapter 13: Biological Waves: Single-Species Models
- Chapter 14: Use and Abuse of Fractals

== Part II: Spatial Models and Biomedical Applications ==
Part II of Mathematical Biology focuses on pattern formation and applications of reaction-diffusion equations. Topics include: predator-prey interactions, chemotaxis, wound healing, epidemic models, and morphogenesis.

- Chapter 1: Multi-Species Waves and Practical Applications
- Chapter 2: Spatial Pattern Formation with Reaction Diffusion Systems
- Chapter 3: Animal Coat Patterns and Other Practical Applications of Reaction Diffusion Mechanisms
- Chapter 4: Pattern Formation on Growing Domains: Alligators and Snakes
- Chapter 5: Bacterial Patterns and Chemotaxis
- Chapter 6: Mechanical Theory for Generating Pattern and Form in Development
- Chapter 7: Evolution, Morphogenetic Laws, Developmental Constraints and Teratologies
- Chapter 8: A Mechanical Theory of Vascular Network Formation
- Chapter 9: Epidermal Wound Healing
- Chapter 10: Dermal Wound Healing
- Chapter 11: Growth and Control of Brain Tumours
- Chapter 12: Neural Models of Pattern Formation
- Chapter 13: Geographic Spread and Control of Epidemics
- Chapter 14: Wolf Territoriality, Wolf-Deer Interaction and Survival

== Impact ==
Since its initial publication, the monograph has come to be seen as a highly influential work in the field of mathematical biology. It serves as the essential text for most high level mathematical biology courses around the world, and is credited with transforming the field from a niche subject into a standard research area of applied mathematics.
