= James D. Murray =

Scottish-American mathematician

James Murray
- Born: James Dickson Murray; 2 January 1931 (age 95); Moffat, Scotland
- Education: University of St Andrews
- Awards: FRS (1985); IMA Gold Medal (2008)
- Scientific career
- Workplaces: University of Oxford; University of Washington
- Doctoral advisor: Andrew Ronald Mitchell
- Doctoral students: Philip Maini; Mark A. Lewis; Trachette Jackson
- Website: www.maths.ox.ac.uk/people/james.murray

James Dickson Murray FRSE FRS (born 2 January 1931) is professor emeritus of applied mathematics at University of Washington and University of Oxford. He is best known for his authoritative and extensive work entitled Mathematical Biology.

== Early life ==
Murray was born in Moffat, Scotland, and was educated at St. Andrews University, where he received with honours a bachelor's degree in mathematics in 1953. He took his PhD there in 1956.

== Research and career ==
His first post was at the University of Durham, UK; later he has held positions at Harvard University, London and Oxford, becoming professor of mechanical engineering at the University of Michigan in 1965, at the age of 34.

He later became professor of mathematical biology at the University of Oxford, a fellow and tutor in mathematics at Corpus Christi College, Oxford and founder and director of the Centre for Mathematical Biology. He left Oxford in the late 1980s for the University of Washington in Seattle, where he spent the rest of his career as professor of mathematics and adjunct professor of zoology.

His research is characterised by its great range and depth: an early example is his fundamental contributions to understanding the biomechanics of the human body when launched from an aircraft in an ejection seat. He has made contributions to many other areas, ranging from understanding and preventing severe scarring; fingerprint formation; sex determination, modelling of animal coat and territory formation in wolf-deer interacting populations.

== Awards and honours ==
Murray was elected a Fellow of the Royal Society of Edinburgh in 1979 and a Fellow of the Royal Society (FRS) in 1985.

In 2008 Murray and Professor T. J. Pedley, FRS were jointly awarded the Gold Medal of the Institute of Mathematics and its Applications in recognition of their "outstanding contributions to mathematics and its applications over a period of years".
