= Avner Friedman =

American mathematician (born 1932)

- Born: November 19, 1932 (age 93); Israel
- Education: Hebrew University
- Awards: Sloan Fellowship (1962–65); Guggenheim Fellowship (1966–67); Stampacchia Prize (1982)
- Scientific career
- Fields: Mathematics
- Workplaces: Ohio State University
- Doctoral advisor: Shmuel Agmon
- Doctoral students: Robert R. Jensen

Avner Friedman (Hebrew: אבנר פרידמן; born November 19, 1932) is Distinguished Professor of Mathematics and Physical Sciences at Ohio State University. His primary field of research is partial differential equations, with interests in stochastic processes, mathematical modeling, free boundary problems, and control theory.

Friedman received his Ph.D. degree in 1956 from the Hebrew University. He was a professor of mathematics at Northwestern University (1962–1985), a Duncan Distinguished Professor of Mathematics at Purdue University (1985–1987), and a professor of mathematics (Regents' Professor from 1996) at the University of Minnesota (1987–2001). He was director of the Institute for Mathematics and its Applications from 1987 to 1997. He was the founding director of Minnesota Center for Industrial Mathematics (1994–2001). He was the founding director of the Mathematical Biosciences Institute at Ohio State University, serving as its first director from 2002–2008.

Friedman has been the chair of the Board of Mathematical Sciences (1994–1997) and the president of the Society for Industrial and Applied Mathematics (1993–1994). He has been awarded the Sloan Fellowship (1962–65), the Guggenheim Fellowship (1966–7), the Stampacchia Prize (1982), the National Science Foundation Special Creativity Award (1983–85; 1991–93). He is a Fellow of the American Academy of Arts and Sciences (since 1987) and a member of the National Academy of Sciences (since 1993). In 2009 he became a Fellow of the Society for Industrial and Applied Mathematics. In 2012 he became a fellow of the American Mathematical Society.

He has been adviser to 27 doctoral students and has published 25 books and over 500 papers.

== Works ==
1. Generalized Functions and Partial Differential Equations. Prentice-Hall (1963). Dover Publications 2005 ISBN 978-0486446103; 2011 Dover reprint ISBN 978-0486466255
2. Partial Differential Equations of Parabolic Type. Prentice-Hall (1964). 2008 Dover Publications; 2013 Dover reprint ISBN 978-0486466255
3. Partial Differential Equations. Holt, Rinehart, and Winston, New York (1969). reprint Dover Books 2008 ISBN 978-0486469195
4. Foundations of Modern Analysis. Holt, Rinehart, and Winston, New York (1970). ISBN 978-0030812910 (hbk); 1982 Dover reprint; Dover Publications on Mathematics 2010. ISBN 978-0486640624
5. Advanced Calculus. Holt, Rinehart, and Winston, New York (1971). Dover Publications 2007 ISBN 978-0486446103
6. Differential Games. John Wiley, Interscience Publishers (1971). Dover Publications 2006 ISBN 978-0486449951 2013 Dover reprint
7. Stochastic Differential Equations and Applications. Vol. 1, Academic Press (1975). Dover Books 2006. ISBN 978-0486453590
8. Stochastic Differential Equations and Applications. Vol. 2, Academic Press (1976). ISBN 978-1483204451
9. Variational Principles and Free Boundary Problems, Wiley & Sons (1983). Dover Publications on Mathematics 2010 ISBN 978-0486478531; 2012 pbk reprint, Springer
10. Mathematics in Industrial Problems, IMA Volume 16, Springer-Verlag (1988).
11. Mathematics in Industrial Problems, Part 2, IMA Volume 24, Springer-Verlag (1989); 2012 pbk reprint
12. Mathematics in Industrial Problems, Part 3, IMA Volume 31, Springer-Verlag (1990). ISBN 978-0387974361
13. Mathematics in Industrial Problems, Part 4, IMA Volume 38, Springer-Verlag (1991). 2012 pbk reprint
14. Mathematics in Industrial Problems, Part 5, IMA Volume 49, Springer-Verlag (1992). 2012 pbk reprint
15. Mathematics in Industrial Problems, Part 6, IMA Volume 57, Springer-Verlag (1993).
16. (with W. Littman) Problems in Industrial Mathematics, SIAM, Philadelphia (1994). ISBN 978-0898713244
17. Mathematics in Industrial Problems, Part 7, IMA Volume 67, Springer-Verlag (1994).
18. Mathematics in Industrial Problems, Part 8, IMA Volume 83, Springer-Verlag (1996).
19. Mathematics in Industrial Problems, Part 9, IMA Volume 88, Springer-Verlag (1997).
20. Mathematics in Industrial Problems, Part 10, IMA Volume 100, Springer-Verlag (1998).
21. (with D. Ross) Mathematical Models in Photographic Science, Springer-Verlag (2002). ISBN 978-3642629136
22. (with B. Aguda) Models of Cellular Regulation, Oxford University Press, 2008. ISBN 978-0198570912
23. (with Chiu-Yen Kao). Mathematical Modeling with Biological Processes. Springer. 2014 ISBN 978-3319083131
24. (with Ching-Shan Chou) Introduction to Mathematical Biology: Modeling, Analysis, and Simulations. Springer-Verlag 2016 ISBN 978-3319296364
25. Mathematical Biology: Modeling and Analysis. American Mathematical Society. 2018 ISBN 978-1470447151
