= Santiago Schnell =

Venezuelan mathematical biologist

Santiago Schnell FRSB FRSC
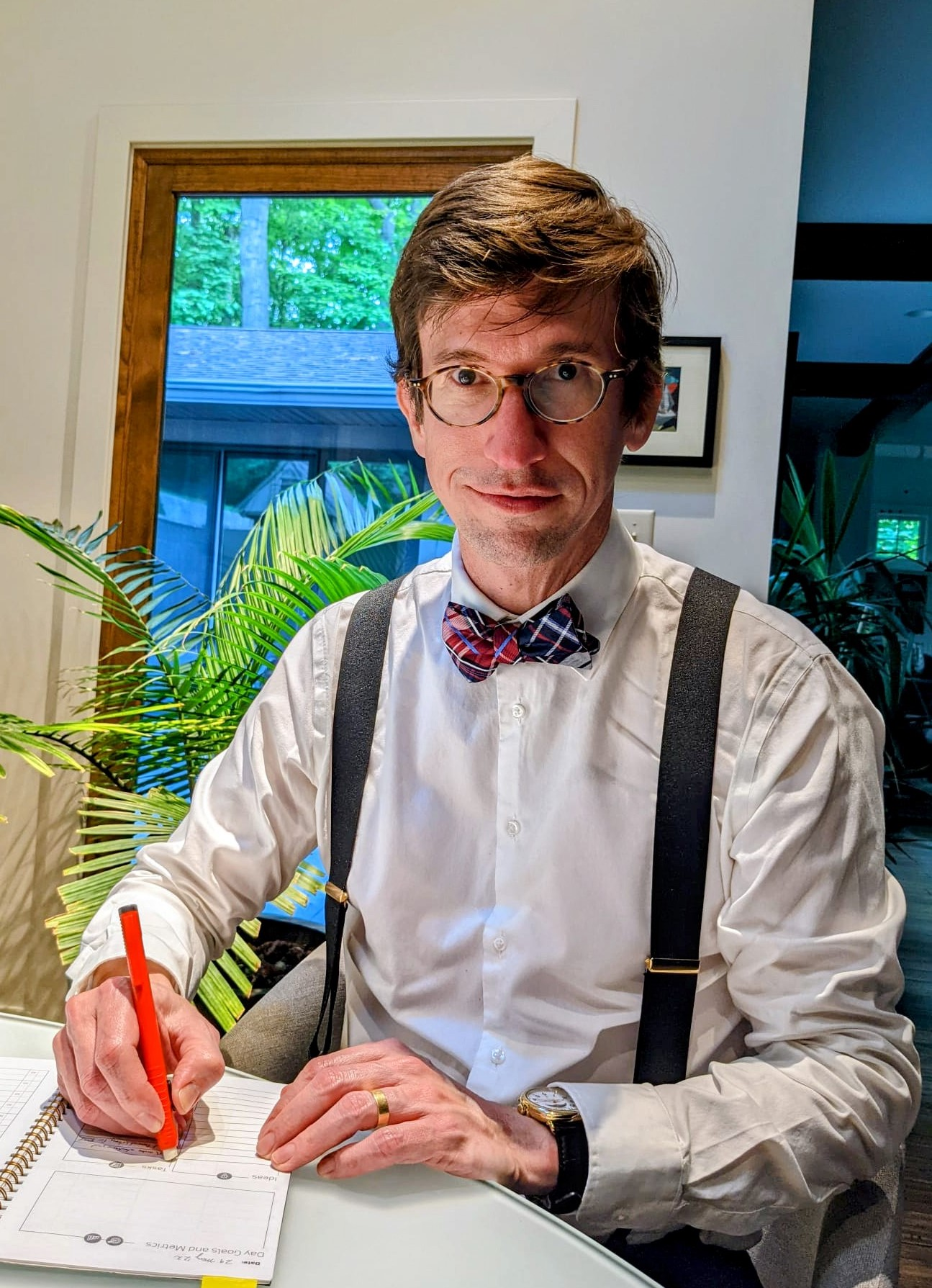
- Schnell in 2022
- Born: 6 October 1971 (age 55); Caracas, Venezuela
- Education: Simón Bolívar University (Lic.); University of Oxford (DPhil)
- Spouse: Mariana
- Children: 2
- Awards: Fellow of the Royal Society of Chemistry (2011); Fellow of the American Association for the Advancement of Science (2016); Fellow of the Royal Society of Biology (2023)
- Scientific career
- Fields: Mathematical and theoretical biology, Enzyme kinetics, Biophysics
- Workplaces: University of Oxford; Indiana University Bloomington; University of Michigan; University of Notre Dame; Dartmouth College
- Doctoral advisor: Philip Maini
- Doctoral students: Ruth Baker
- Website: schnell-lab.nd.edu

Santiago Schnell FRSB FRSC (born 6 October 1971) is a Venezuelan scientist and academic administrator who was the provost of Dartmouth College, where he also held appointments as professor of mathematics in the School of Arts and Sciences.

Prior to his appointment at Dartmouth, he served as the William K. Warren Foundation Dean of the College of Science at the University of Notre Dame. Earlier in his career, he held faculty appointments at the University of Michigan, where he was chair of the department of molecular and integrative physiology and the John A. Jacquez Collegiate Professor of Physiology, and at the University of Oxford as a junior research fellow at Christ Church.

Schnell resigned as provost of Dartmouth College in October 2026 following an internal investigation that found he did not disclose his use of artificial intelligence in his academic writings.

== Early life and education ==
Schnell was born and raised in Caracas, Venezuela. His early interest in science was influenced by his neighbor, Serafín Mazparrote, a Spanish biologist and educator who introduced him to field studies and scientific observation. At age 10, Schnell received a Sinclair ZX81 personal computer from his father, which helped develop his interest in mathematical and computational approaches to scientific questions.

He earned a licentiate degree in biology from Simón Bolívar University in 1997 and later completed a DPhil in mathematics at the University of Oxford in 2003. His doctoral and postdoctoral research was carried out under the supervision of Philip Maini, FRS, at the Wolfson Centre for Mathematical Biology at Oxford.

== Career ==
From 2001 to 2004, Schnell was a Junior Research Fellow at Christ Church, University of Oxford, and a Research Fellow of the Wellcome Trust at the Centre for Mathematical Biology. In 2004, he joined the faculty at Indiana University Bloomington as an assistant professor of informatics and associate director of the Biocomplexity Institute.

In 2008, Schnell moved to the University of Michigan, where he was appointed associate professor of molecular and integrative physiology and a Brehm Investigator in the Brehm Center for Diabetes Research. In 2013, he received a joint appointment as associate professor in the Department of Computational Medicine and Bioinformatics, and in 2015 he was promoted to professor in both departments. He was named the John A. Jacquez Collegiate Professor of Physiology in 2016 and served as chair of the Department of Molecular & Integrative Physiology from 2017 to 2021. During his tenure, the department received the most funding from the National Institutes of Health (NIH) among physiology departments.

Schnell is a past president of the Society for Mathematical Biology. During his tenure, the society launched several new awards to recognize contributions across career stages, including the H. D. Landahl Mathematical Biophysics Award for graduate students and postdoctoral researchers, the Leah Edelstein-Keshet Prize for women in mathematical biology, the John Jungck Prize for Excellence in Education, and the SMB Fellows Program. Schnell has also served as Editor-in-Chief of the journal Mathematical Biosciences and is a member of the Commission on Standards for Reporting Enzymology Data (STRENDA).

== Research ==
Schnell's research is focused on the development of mathematical and computational models in the biomedical sciences, with the goal of improving measurement accuracy and understanding the dynamics of complex biological systems. His work spans two main areas: (1) standardization of quantitative methods in biomedical research and scientometrics, and (2) mathematical modeling of reaction kinetics and intracellular processes.

He has contributed to the theoretical analysis of enzyme kinetics, particularly in the context of the Michaelis–Menten mechanism. Schnell derived a closed-form expression—now known as the Schnell-Mendoza equation—for estimating the Michaelis constant and maximum reaction velocity using time-course data under initial rate conditions.

Schnell has also examined how the rate laws describing intracellular biochemical reactions are affected by the physicochemical conditions of the cellular environment, including macromolecular crowding. His research has addressed ambiguities in modeling reaction dynamics in non-ideal conditions, contributing to efforts to improve reproducibility in quantitative biology.

In addition to his work on enzyme kinetics, Schnell has developed multiscale models to study developmental processes and cancer biology. His research in this area has been featured in scientific publications such as American Scientist, Investigación y Ciencia (Spanish edition of Scientific American), and Spektrum der Wissenschaft (Germany).

== Academic administration ==
=== University of Notre Dame ===
In 2021, Schnell was appointed the William K. Warren Foundation Dean of the College of Science at the University of Notre Dame. During his tenure, the college launched several new academic and public engagement initiatives. That fall, Notre Dame established a national undergraduate minor in rare disease patient advocacy, reported to be the first program of its kind in the United States.

He contributed to securing a $20 million gift to endow the Berthiaume Institute for Precision Health, a new research center on campus. Schnell also oversaw the planning and expansion of the university’s East Campus Research Complex with the addition of a 200,000-square-foot science and engineering building.

To promote science communication and outreach, Schnell established the Notre Dame Christmas Lectures, modeled after the Royal Institution Christmas Lectures. He also created a professorship in the public understanding of science, which was among the first such positions at a U.S. university.

In 2022, he launched the Rev. Joseph Carrier, C.S.C., Science Medal, awarded by the College of Science for sustained achievements in scientific research. The inaugural recipient was Nobel laureate Donna Strickland.

=== Dartmouth College ===
On May 20, 2025, Schnell was announced as the next provost of Dartmouth College, succeeding David Kotz. Dartmouth announced that Schnell would join the faculty as a professor of mathematics and an adjunct professor at the Geisel School of Medicine.

On October 28, 2026, it was announced that Schnell would resign from his position as provost of Dartmouth College following an internal investigation that found he had violated Dartmouth's AI policies and did not disclose his usage of AI in academic writing.

== Dartmouth resignation and AI use controversy ==
On August 26, 2026, the news website Semafor ran an audit of guest columns in newspapers, claiming several writers, including Schnell, had used a large language model to write their publications. On September 21, The Dartmouth published a full report of Schnell's writing, arguing that 96% of his academic and opinion articles were written with the undisclosed use of generative artificial intelligence. Using the software Pangram, the publication claimed that several of these pieces were "100% AI-written." In response, Schnell acknowledged his use of models for "language refinement, copyediting, improving clarity and organization," but denied that his writing is wholly written by AI.

On October 1, 2026, Schnell apologized for not properly disclosing the use of large language models in his writing. Several Dartmouth students and the college's chapter of the American Association of University Professors called on the college administration to remove Schnell from his current position.

On September 25, College President Sian Beilock announced that Dartmouth had launched an investigation into his academic and public writing, saying there would be a "rigorous, objective review" of his publications. Schnell's case has since sparked broader debates about what, if any, constitutes ethical AI use in writing on college campuses.

Schnell resigned from Dartmouth following an internal investigation that confirmed these accusations on October 28, 2026.

== Honors and awards ==
Schnell has received recognition for both his research and teaching. In 2006, he received the Faculty Award for Teaching Excellence from the School of Informatics at Indiana University. At the University of Michigan Medical School, he was inducted into the League of Educational Excellence in 2013, and received the Endowment for Basic Science Teaching Award in the same year.

In 2010, Schnell was awarded the James S. McDonnell Foundation 21st Century Science Award for his work on network topologies associated with conformational diseases.

He is a Fellow of the Royal Society of Chemistry, the Royal Society of Biology, and the Royal Society of Medicine. He is also a Corresponding Member of the Academia de Ciencias de América Latina.

Schnell was elected a Fellow of the American Association for the Advancement of Science in recognition of his contributions to mathematical biology, including the modeling of biochemical reactions and estimation of kinetic parameters.

In 2023, he received the Arthur T. Winfree Prize from the Society for Mathematical Biology for his contributions to enzyme kinetics and mathematical biology. That same year, he was named the recipient of the SACNAS Distinguished Scientist Award by the Society for Advancement of Chicanos and Native Americans in Science, in recognition of his work on enzyme kinetics and the mathematical modeling of the polymerase chain reaction.

He has also served as a visiting professor in the Department of Chemistry at the University of Barcelona.

== Personal life ==
Schnell is married and has two children. According to a university profile, personal health experiences have influenced his decision to focus his research on biomedical problems, including disease detection and measurement.

Schnell is Catholic.
