= Mathematical physiology =

Interdisciplinary science

Mathematical physiology is an interdisciplinary science. Primarily, it investigates ways in which mathematics can be used to give insight into physiological questions. In turn, it also describes how physiological questions can lead to new mathematical problems. The field may be broadly grouped into two physiological application areas: cell physiology – including mathematical treatments of biochemical reactions, ionic flow and regulation of function – and systems physiology – including electrocardiology, circulation and digestion.
