= Mathematical Biosciences =

- Discipline: Mathematical modelling in bioscience
- Language: English
- Edited by: Santiago Schnell

Publication details
- History: 1967–present
- Publisher: Elsevier
- Frequency: Monthly
- Impact factor: 4.300 (2022)

Standard abbreviations
- ISO 4: Math. Biosci.

Indexing
- CODEN: MABIAR
- ISSN: 0025-5564
- LCCN: 68130147
- OCLC no.: 1681432

Links
- Journal homepage; Online archive

Mathematical Biosciences is a monthly peer-reviewed scientific journal publishing work that provides new concepts or new understanding of biological systems using mathematical models, or methodological articles likely to find application to multiple biological systems. Papers are expected to present a major research finding of broad significance for the biosciences, or mathematical biology. Mathematical Biosciences welcomes original research articles, letters, reviews and perspectives.

The journal was established in 1967 and is published by Elsevier. The editor-in-chief is the mathematical biologist is Abba Gumel. His predecessor was the mathematical and theoretical biologist Santiago Schnell from the University of Notre Dame. Under Schnell's leadership, the journal raised its impact factor from 1.680 (in 2018) to 4.300 (in 2022).

== Abstracting and indexing ==
The journal is abstracted and indexed in:

- BIOSIS Previews
- Elsevier BIOBASE
- Chemical Abstracts
- Current Contents/Life Sciences
- MEDLINE/PubMed
- Mathematical Reviews
- EMBASE
- Engineering Index
- Inspec
- Zentralblatt MATH
- Scopus
- EMBiology
- Science Citation Index
- The Zoological Record

According to the Journal Citation Reports, the journal has a 2021 impact factor of 3.935.

== Bellman Prize ==
The Mathematical Biosciences "Bellman Prize" is a biennial award to a research team or single investigator, whose Mathematical Bioscience article has made an outstanding contribution to their research field over the last five years. The deadline for submitting nominations for the Bellman Prize is April 1 of the year for which the prize is awarded. Nominations are accepted for any Mathematical Biosciences original research paper published four and five years before the nomination year cycle. The prize committee does not consider self-nominations, but anyone else can submit a nomination.

The prize was established in 1985 and is named for Richard Bellman, the first editor-in-chief.
