= COVID-19 pandemic in Hubei =

- Disease: COVID-19
- Pathogen: SARS-CoV-2
- Location: Hubei, China
- First outbreak: Jianghan District, Wuhan
- Index case: December 1, 2019 (6 years, 11 months, 2 weeks and 5 days ago)
- Confirmed cases: 68,150
- Suspected cases: 168,000 total
- Hospitalized cases: 50,340 total
- Recovered: 63,637
- Deaths: 4,512

The COVID-19 pandemic in Hubei was the first identified outbreak of the COVID-19 virus. It emerged as a cluster of mysterious pneumonia cases in Wuhan, the provincial capital of Hubei, China. A Wuhan hospital initially notified the local Chinese Center for Disease Control and Prevention (CCDC) of a viral pneumonia of unknown etiology on December 27, 2019. By December 31, Wuhan CCDC confirmed a cluster of unknown pneumonia cases linked to the Huanan Seafood Wholesale Market after unverified documents appeared on the Internet. The outbreak got nationwide attention, with the National Health Commission (NHC) in Beijing sending medical experts to Wuhan the next day. On January 8, 2020, a new coronavirus was identified as the cause of the pneumonia. The sequence of the virus was published on an open-access database. The measures taken by the Chinese government have been controversial. They were praised by the World Health Organization (WHO) for improvements over their response to SARS-CoV-2. However, many in the international community criticized them for being deceptive, slow to publicly disclose key facts about the outbreak, and for aggressively censoring information related to the outbreak and public discontent from citizens online.

The delayed and controversial response by authorities in Wuhan and Hubei failed to contain the outbreak in the early stages, leading to criticism from the public and the media. By January 29, the virus had spread to all provinces of mainland China. In response, all provinces of China initiated their highest response level for public health emergencies. On January 30, the WHO declared the outbreak a "public health emergency of international concern." By February 8, over 724 had died from the coronavirus infection-associated pneumonia, and 34,878 were confirmed to be infected. In Hubei alone, there were 24,953 cases of infection and 699 COVID-19–related deaths.

The General Secretary of the Communist Party of China, Xi Jinping, warned about a "grave situation" facing China. The Politburo of the Communist Party of China formed a special leading group for epidemic control led by Premier Li Keqiang. The Chinese New Year celebrations planned for January 25 through February 4 were cancelled, and those traveling for the event were checked for their temperatures as travel restrictions went into effect. Commands for Epidemic Control (CEC) were created in several regions including Wuhan and Hubei. Many inter-province bus services and railway services were suspended. By January 29, all Hubei cities were quarantined. Curfew laws were implemented in Huanggang and Wenzhou, and in several other mainland cities. The region also saw a huge shortage of face masks and other personal protective equipment (PPE) despite being the world's biggest manufacturing hub for those products.

As reported cases increased and the virus spread internationally, instances of conspiracy theories, discrimination, and xenophobic violence both regionally in China and abroad exploded in frequency, despite many international governments unilaterally condemning the actions. Rumours fueled by lack of government transparency and fear of the public health crisis circulated across Chinese social media, which were countered by the CCP in an attempt to restore the Chinese people's faith in government leaders.

== Early response by Wuhan ==
One of the earliest Wuhan MHC notices about the pneumonia epidemic. It was first posted on Weibo on 30 December 2019 and was confirmed by Wuhan CDC the next day (31 December).

=== Mysterious pneumonia outbreak ===
==== Discovery ====
On March 13, 2020, an unverified report from the South China Morning Post suggested that a COVID-19 case, traced back to November 17, 2019, in a 55-year-old from Hubei province, may have been the first patient. On March 27, 2020, news outlets citing a government document reported that a 57-year-old woman, who had tested positive for the coronavirus disease on December 10, 2019 and was described in The Wall Street Journal on March 6, 2020, may have been patient zero in the COVID-19 pandemic. A viral pneumonia patient with an unknown cause was hospitalized at Jinyintan Hospital on December 1, 2019, even though the patient did not have any exposure to the Huanan Seafood Market. An outbreak of the virus began among people who had been exposed to the market nine days later. On December 26, Shanghai PHC received a sample from a patient with unknown pneumonia from Wuhan CCDC and Wuhan Central Hospital. They started an investigation into the sample, which was then confirmed to contain a new coronavirus.

However, the outbreak went unnoticed until a cluster of unknown pneumonias was observed by a Wuhan doctor named Zhang Jixian. Zhang was an ICU doctor at Hubei Hospital of Integrated Traditional Chinese and Western Medicine. Her experience fighting SARS in 2003 kept her alert to the possibility of a public health emergency. On December 26, 2019, a senior couple who lived near Zhang's hospital came to her for their fever and cough. The CT scan results of the couple's thorax showed unusual changes in the lungs that were different from those in any known viral pneumonia. Dr. Zhang advised the couple's son to see her and found similar conditions. On December 27, Zhang's hospital received another patient exhibiting symptoms of coughing and fever. The patient's CT scan showed the same lung abnormalities as the elderly couple. Zhang prescribed a series of influenza tests for the four viral infected individuals, all of which returned negative.

Also on December 27, Zhang reported her discovery to her hospital which promptly informed the Jianghan CCDC, thinking that it might be an infectious disease as indicated by the familial cluster. As a precaution, she told her colleagues to wear protective gear and prepare a specialized area in the hospital to receive patients with similar conditions.

On December 28 and 29, three more patients came to the hospital's clinic, all of whom were related to the Huanan Seafood Market. The hospital notified the provincial and municipal health commissions. On December 29, the health commissions appointed Wuhan and Jianghan CCDC and Jinyintan Hospital to undertake epidemiological research for the seven patients. Six were then transferred to Jinyintan, a specialized facility for infectious diseases. Only one patient refused the transfer. Dr. Zhang Jixian's discovery was later widely praised. Hubei's government honored her and Zhang Dingyu, the president of Jinyintan, for their contribution to controlling the viral outbreak.

==== Disclosure ====
On the evening of December 30, two emergent notice letters from the Municipal Health Commission of Wuhan began circulating online. This was soon confirmed by Wuhan CCDC, which admitted on December 31 that there were 27 cases of pneumonia of unknown cause. The letters required all hospitals in Wuhan to report any pneumonia patient with unknown causes related to the Huanan Seafood Market. After a rumor about it circulated on the internet, Wuhan CCDC told The Beijing News the investigation was still underway and that experts from NHC were on the way to help the investigation.

On January 1, 2020, the seafood market was closed down by Jianghan District's Health Agency and Administration for Market Regulation due to an "environment improvement." According to China Business, workers in hazmat suits were inspecting the market and collecting samples. The storekeepers at the market said that they were not told what the people were collecting and detecting. The urban management officers and police officers were on the spot to ask the storekeepers to finish up and leave the market. The first death from the new virus was reported on January 11.

Within three weeks of the first known cases, the government built sixteen large mobile hospitals in Wuhan and sent 40,000 medical staff to the city. Implementing these measures made Chinese perceptions of the government's response more favorable.

Several doctors were warned by the Wuhan police for "spreading misinformation". According to Wang Gaofei, Weibo's CEO, eight "rumormongers" who were all doctors at Wuhan hospitals were summoned by the police on January 3. Li Wenliang, one of the whistleblowers, died from the virus on February 7; the same day that the discoverers of the outbreak, Zhang Jixian and Zhang Dingyu, were honored by Hubei's government. The death of Dr. Li led to widespread grief and criticism towards the government.

=== Human-to-human transmission ===
==== Initial denials ====
Although the early cases surrounding an animal market may suggest animal-to-human transmission, more evidence surfaced to support human-to-human transmission of the virus. However, despite the expert-led investigation, early signs of human-to-human transmission such as a hospital-acquired infection (nosocomial) case was confirmed on January 10. According to Caixin, the local government of Wuhan denied any case of nosocomial infection and kept claiming that "there was no clear sign of human-to-human transmission." This continued until January 15, when Wuhan's Municipal Health Commission (MHC) said on its website that "the result of present investigation shows no clear evidence of human-to-human transmission, but this does not rule the possibility of such a transmission out. The risk of continuous human-to-human transmission is low." According to Ray Yip, former country director for China in the US CDC, and other US health and national security officials, authorities in Wuhan told Chinese CDC field investigators sent there at the beginning of January that there was no evidence of human-to-human transmission, and did not show them all the cases; in particular infected hospital workers, which were an obvious sign of human-to-human transmission.

==== Frozen case number ====
Between January 6–17, the reported number of cases froze at 41. During the Hubei Lianghui and Wuhan Lianghui (local parliament sessions), the authorities of Hubei and Wuhan claimed the freeze was due to the lack of PCR test kits for the new virus. However, Caixin said that the other sequencing techniques could be used for diagnosis, which usually took two days without any need for PCR kits. Meanwhile, an Imperial College group and a Hong Kong University group both estimated over 1,000 cases in Wuhan, as cases were being exported and confirmed overseas. Perceived discrepancies in the official Chinese data for the number of cases left many netizens doubtful, with some mockingly labeling the virus "patriotic" for its appearance of mainly infecting Chinese even after they left the country.

==== National Health Commission response ====
On January 20, the Chinese National Health Commission announced that human-to-human transmission of the coronavirus had already occurred.

Also on January 20, the number of reported new cases soared to 136 as the major mainland cities including Beijing and Shenzhen reported their first cases. Only the Wuhan authorities stopped claiming that the virus had a limited ability to transmit between humans. On the same day, the city formed specialized command for epidemic control (CEC) to upgrade measures to cope with the epidemic including enhanced protection over the medical workers and free treatment for all patients at fever clinics. That evening, Zhong Nanshan (one of the NHC experts sent to Wuhan, who was well known for fighting against SARS in 2003) exemplified human-to-human transmission of the new virus with a cluster of 14 hospital-acquired infections in Wuhan and two familial clusters in Guangdong.

However, the NHC still insisted that the epidemic should be "manageable and preventable." At that time, the BBC said that not much public attention was drawn to the virus outbreak. On January 19, despite the virus outbreak, over 40,000 Wuhan families joined an annual potluck banquet, which was a community tradition observed for over two decades to celebrate the Kitchen God Festival. A community leader told The Beijing News that "everything is normal now" when asked about the virus outbreak. According to the community committee of Baibuting (where the banquet was held), as of February 4, a block of the community had at least 10 confirmed cases of the coronavirus infection, plus over 30 highly suspicious cases; but the community hospital also said that the incidents of the coronavirus was lower than that in the other communities.

Zhou Xianwang, the mayor of Wuhan who was widely criticized by the public and media due to slow responses, said to the state broadcaster China Central Television (CCTV) that the banquet was organized by the local community, which had a long history of self-governance. He said that the government did not take precautions to stop the event because it believed the virus had limited transmissibility between people.

==== Controversial commentary ====
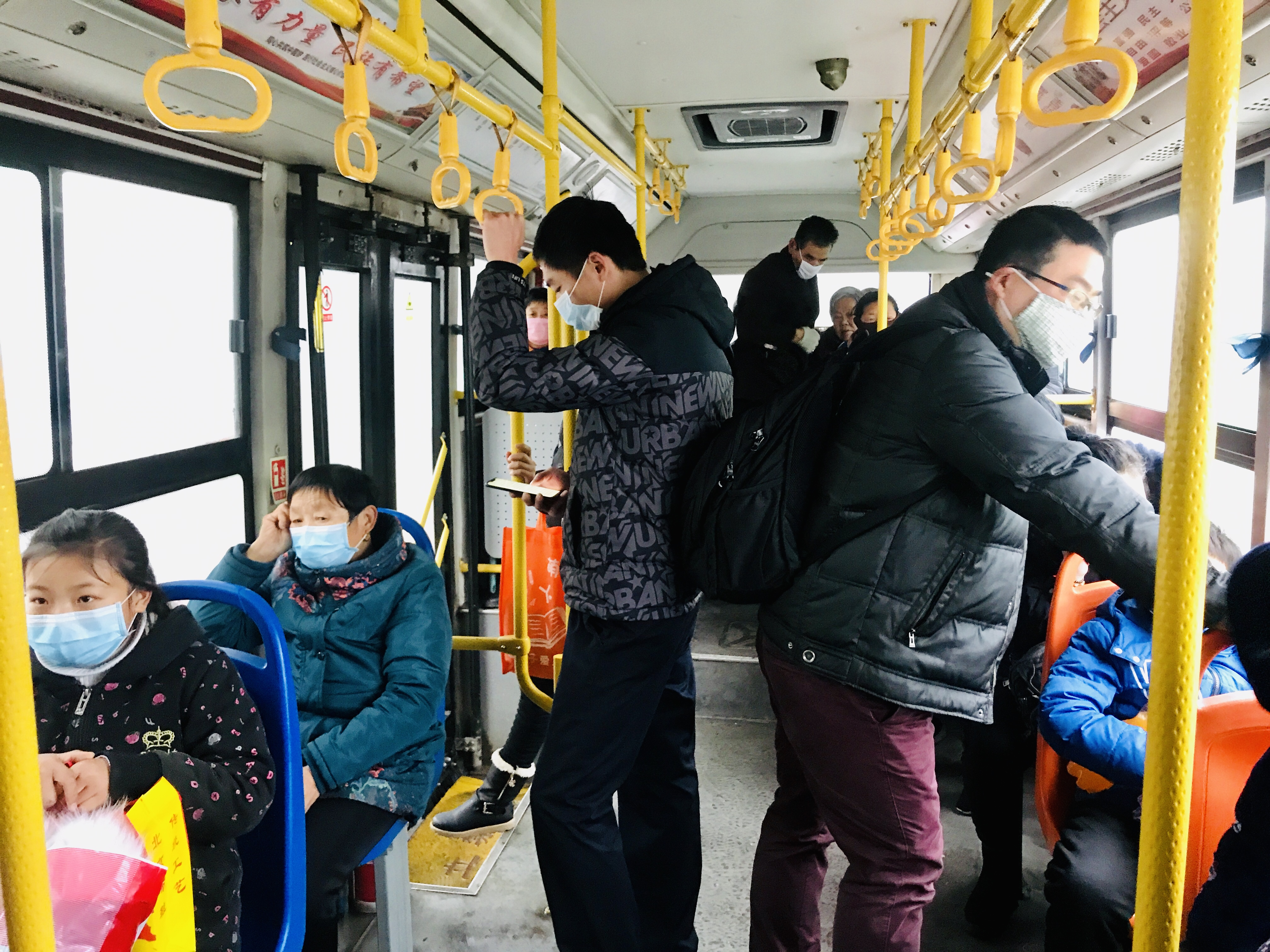
People on a bus wearing masks, Hubei province, January 23, 2020.

On January 20, Guan Yi, an expert in SARS epidemiology from Hong Kong, told Caixin that the local government should not play on words about the transmissibility and hoped that it could learn from the 2002–2004 SARS outbreak. He continued, "transmissibility, adaptability, incidence and virulence of the virus highly resemble those of SARS at the early stage of 2003 outbreak". Guan's team came to Wuhan on January 21 and returned to Hong Kong on the next day. He said to the media that the "epidemiology experts and scientists do not seem to be welcomed in the city." On January 22, Wuhan was still "an open city" to the virus outbreak where most people did not wear a mask, although the NHC announced the coronavirus-associated pneumonia as a notifiable disease. He believed that a pandemic was unavoidable as the virus spread with the migration flow of Chunyun.

The statements of Guan, which were different from those in most Chinese media, became highly controversial as journalists of state media reposted his statement on January 15, where he said that he believed that the disease was manageable and the news that his lab was fined by the Chinese authorities in 2005. Wang Duan, the Caixin journalist who made the interview described such behavior as "personal attacks" and complained that no expert came forward to refute what Guan said.

== Quarantines ==
Confirmed cases in mainland China and Taiwan as of January 22, 2020, a day before Wuhan's lockdown. By the end of January 22, there were 571 confirmed cases across mainland China, among which there were 444 confirmed cases in Hubei.

On January 23, 2020, the central government of the People's Republic of China imposed a lockdown in Wuhan and other cities in Hubei province in an effort to quarantine the outbreak of coronavirus disease 2019 (COVID-19). This was the first known instance in modern history of locking a major city down of as many as 11 million people. The incident was commonly referred to in the media as the "Wuhan lockdown" (Chinese: 武汉封城; pinyin: Wǔhàn fēng chéng). The World Health Organization (WHO), though stating that it was beyond its own guidelines, commended the move, calling it "unprecedented in public health history". The lockdown in Wuhan set the precedence for similar measures in the other Chinese cities. Within hours of the Wuhan lockdown, travel restrictions were also imposed on the nearby cities of Huanggang and Ezhou and were eventually imposed on all other 15 cities in Hubei, affecting a total of about 57 million people. On February 2, 2020, Wenzhou, Zhejiang, implemented a seven-day lockdown in which only one person per household was allowed to exit once each two days; and most of the highway exits were closed.

=== Health screening ===
On January 19, according to Wuhan Radio Television, the city authorities said that they would monitor anyone leaving the city as a measure to contain the epidemic. Staff of Hankou Railway Station told The Beijing News on January 20 that they would check the temperature of every passenger moving into and out of the station. If a passenger's temperature was above 38 °C (100 °F), further examinations would be made and they would notify the hospital if necessary. Although the local government claimed that such measures were taken at the airport, railway stations, coach stations and piers in Wuhan since January 14, reports by Hong Kong-based Now News and mainland-based Caixin indicated such measures were not taken at that time. Caixin believed this to be a cause of the surge of confirmed cases.

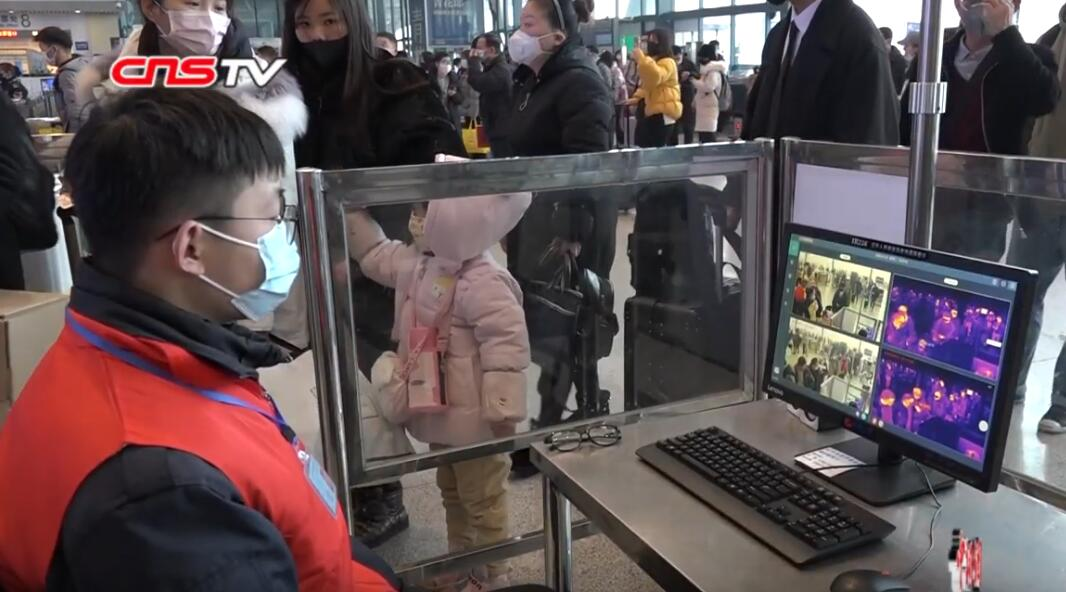
Temperature checks at Wuhan Railway Station

On January 22, Wuhan MHC said that the city would have a random check on any private cars in and out of the city to see whether they carried any kinds of living poultry or wildlife. The city authority began to require all citizens to wear a mask in public places.

=== Travel advice ===
On January 20, at an NHC press conference in Wuhan, Zhong Nanshan advised the public to wear face masks and avoid visiting Wuhan unless it was highly urgent. He also urged the city to perform a temperature check for anyone leaving and take compulsory measures to stop fever patients from leaving. On the following day, Mayor of Wuhan Zhou Xianwang urged Wuhan's citizens not to leave the city and non-Wuhan citizens to avoid coming in an interview by state media. The NHC also warned that a coronavirus outbreak had happened in Wuhan.

On the same day, China Railway and Civil Aviation Administration announced that the passengers were allowed to cancel stays or change dates for free if they booked a ticket from or to Wuhan. Wuhan-bound railway tickets purchased via Hong Kong's MTR could also be refunded. Wuhan announced the postponement of its tourism promotion activities for the Chinese New Year.

=== Lockdown of Wuhan ===
On January 22, Li Lanjuan, one of the NHC experts sent to Wuhan, flew to Beijing and advised the quarantine of Wuhan, which was soon adopted. On the early morning of January 23, the government of Wuhan announced a sudden lockdown at around 2 PM which said, "Since 10:00 AM on January 23, 2020, the city's bus, metro, ferry, coach services will be suspended. Without a special reason, the citizens should not leave Wuhan. Departure from the airport and railway stations will be temporarily prohibited. Recovery time of the services will be announced in further notice." Thus, Wuhan became a locked-down area of a Class A Infectious Disease according to The Law on Prevention and Treatment of Infections Diseases.

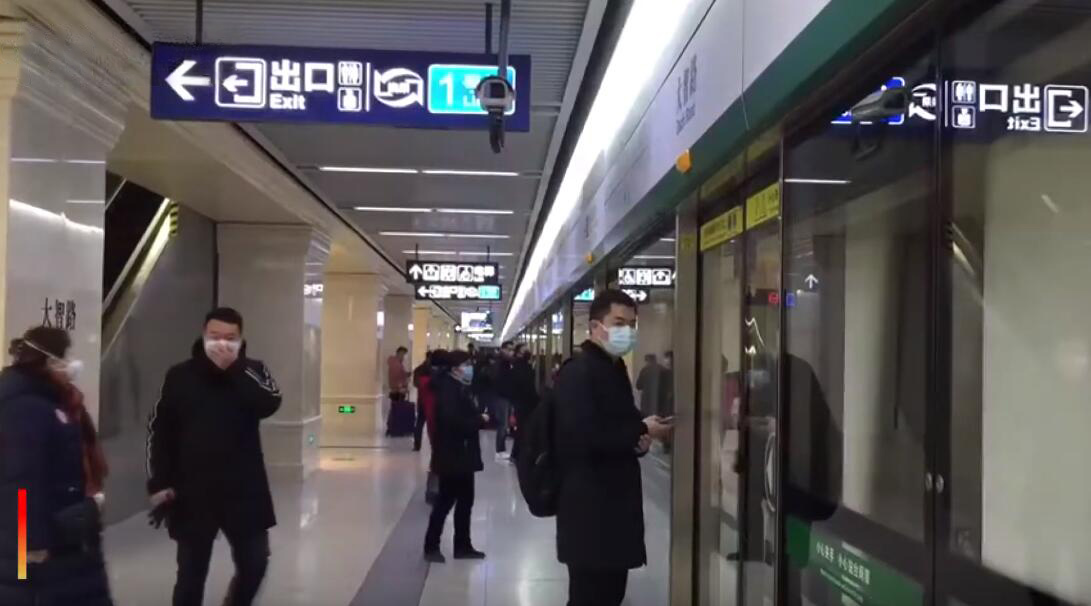
Last train leaving Dazhi Road Metro station at 10:00AM when the lockdown officially began on January 23.

Researchers estimate that the restrictions reduced the basic reproduction number from 2.35 to 1.05, allowing the epidemic to be manageable for Wuhan.

Railway

China Railway announced later on the day of lockdown (January 23) that departure from railway stations in Wuhan would be stopped in order to assist the epidemic control, but transferring trains at Wuchang Station, Wuhan Station and Hankou Station would be still allowed. It also extended free refund and changing policy that originally applied to Wuhan to all parts of mainland China to reduce population movement. On January 24, China Railway Wuhan (CRW) announced suspension of all of its own train services. The company further announced suspension of most corporate train services that it provided, except 6.5 pairs of trains that only runs within Henan Province. Only Jiangan Motive Power Depot, Jiangan Rail Yard and Wuhanbei Station would be fully in service while only a small number of people are reserved for other CRW facilities, and all of the other employees would be on vacation.

Flight

The Tianhe International Airport, Wuhan's only civil airport, suspended all commercial flights from 1 PM on January 23. Various airlines including Cathay Dragon, Spring Airlines, Juneyao Airlines, China Southern Airlines, China Eastern Airlines and All Nippon Airways cancelled their scheduled Wuhan-bound flights. On January 24, the airport was only open to international flights inbound which were required to leave without any passengers. The two cargo planes of SF Express which carried supplies for epidemic control were also allowed to land at the airport.

Road and waterway

Downtown Wuhan after the private car ban.

Shanghai, Sichuan and Jiangsu cancelled all waterway and road passenger transport services to Wuhan and stopped approval of any chartered coaches to Wuhan before the Ministry of Transport called all passenger transport services off for Wuhan and asked the transport sectors to refund the affected tickets for free on January 23.

Although the announcement of lockdown did not mention whether the citizens were allowed to leave Wuhan in their own cars, 30 entries to highways were cut by 14:00. The roadblocks were said to be used in some areas according to BBC. At 23:00, Wuhan CEC decided to stop vehicle for hire services by 12:00 on January 24 and to halve the number of street taxis. Since January 26, the private cars were prohibited from driving in downtown Wuhan.

=== Fleeing Wuhan ===
On the morning of Wuhan's lockdown (January 23), the hashtag (#逃离武汉#), literally meaning "fleeing Wuhan", hit the top of Weibo topics. Wuhan's citizens rushed to the railway stations to leave the city before lockdown, leading to long queues and many later posted about their success. Some of them are criticized for their lack of responsibility after they talked about managing to bypass the temperature check by taking antipyretics. Almost 300 thousand left the city by train before the lockdown, according to China Railway Wuhan.

Zhou Xianwang, the Mayor of Wuhan said that by January 23, 5 million Wuhan's citizens left the city for the Chinese New Year vacation, while 9 million remained in the city. Data analysis by China Business Network showed that each year, only around half of the residents celebrated the Chinese New Year in the city, while 2/3 of those who left the city went to the other parts of Hubei. The rest left for the other Chinese provinces and overseas. Henan, Hunan, Anhui were the top 3 domestic destinations for these, while Bangkok, Singapore and Tokyo were the top 3 overseas destinations.

=== Further lockdowns ===
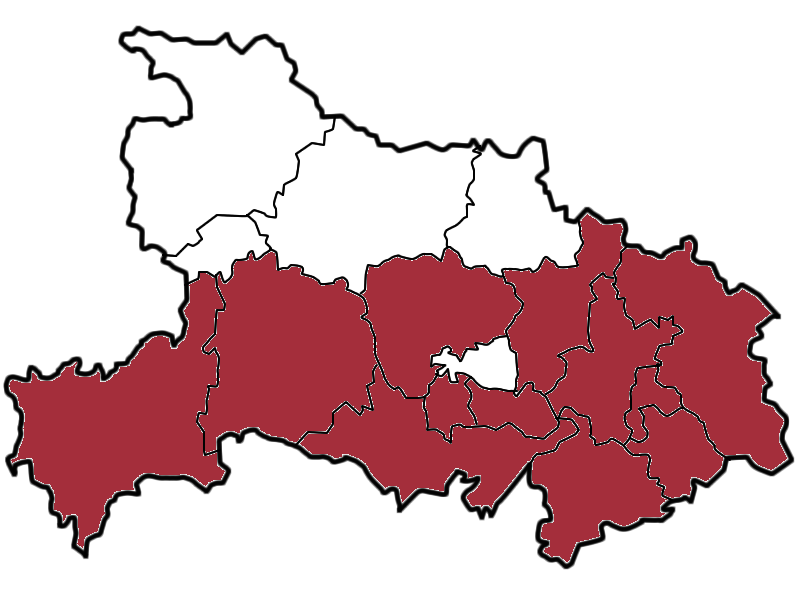
Region of Hubei quarantine is colored red. Mountainous and forest-covered Shennongjia was the only area that was not quarantined.

Soon after Wuhan's lockdown, Huanggang and Ezhou, two Hubei cities bordering Wuhan, followed suit, suspending their public transport systems. By January 24, Huangshi, Chibi, Jingzhou, Yichang, Xiaogan, Jingmen, Zhijiang, Qianjiang, Xiantao, Xianning, Dangyang and Enshi restricted inbound and outbound traffic, affecting over 40 million residents. With Xiangyang becoming the last Hubei city to declare lockdown, all of Hubei's cities were quarantined by January 27, with local access to the road and railway networks temporarily shut down. Forest-covered Shennongjia was the only part of Hubei that had not been locked down.

At least 56 million Hubei's residents were isolated. All public places except hospitals, supermarkets, farmers' markets, gas stations and drug stores were closed. Starting from February 1, the Hubei city of Huanggang introduced a curfew which allows only one member of a local family to shop on the streets every two days, making it the first city to restrict the people from going outdoors.

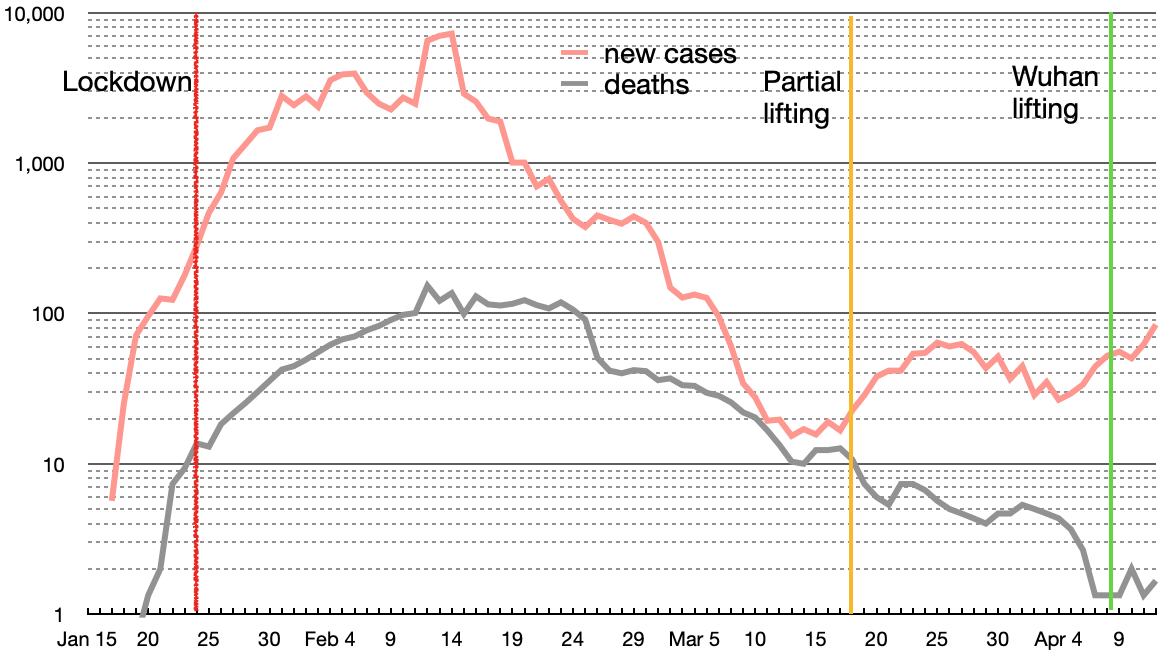
Semi-log graph of new cases and deaths in China during COVID-19 epidemic showing the lockdown and lifting

Semi-log graph of 3-day rolling average of new cases and deaths in China during COVID-19 epidemic showing the lockdown on January 23 and partial lifting on March 19.

== Reactions to government response ==
The exodus from Wuhan before the lockdown resulted in angered responses on Sina Weibo from the residents in the other cities, who were concerned about the spreading of the novel coronavirus to their cities. Some in Wuhan were concerned with the availability of provisions and especially medical supplies during the lockdown.

The World Health Organization called the Wuhan lockdown unprecedented and said that it showed how committed that the authorities were to contain a viral breakout. Later, the WHO clarified that the move was not a recommendation that WHO made and that the authorities would have to wait to evaluate its effectiveness. The WHO separately stated that the possibility of locking an entire city down was "new to science".

The CSI 300 Index, an aggregate measure of the top 300 stocks in the Shanghai and Shenzhen stock exchanges, dropped almost 3% on 23 January 2020, the biggest single-day loss in almost 9 months after the Wuhan lockdown. As it was announced, investors sought a safe haven for their investments.

The unprecedented scale of this lockdown generated controversy and at least one expert criticized this measure as "risky business" that "could very easily backfire" by forcing otherwise healthy people in Wuhan to stay in close conditions with infected people. Drawing a cordon sanitaire around a city of 11 million people raises inevitable ethical concerns. It also drew comparisons to the lockdown of the poor West Point neighborhood in Liberia during the 2014 ebola outbreak which was lifted after ten days.

The lockdown caused panic in Wuhan, and many expressed concern about the city's ability to cope with the outbreak. A medical historian named Howard Markel argued that the Chinese government "may now be overreacting, imposing an unjustifiable burden on the population" and said that "incremental restrictions, enforced steadily and transparently tended to work far better than draconian measures." Others such as Anthony Fauci, the director of the United States National Institute of Allergy and Infectious Diseases, defended the intent behind the lockdowns, citing that the lockdowns bought the world a "delay to essentially prepare better." A mathematical epidemiologist named Gerardo Chowell of Georgia State University stated that, based on mathematical modelling, "containment strategies implemented in China are successfully reducing transmission."

Nonetheless, after northern Italy became a new hotspot of the outbreak in late February, the Italian government enacted what has been called a "Wuhan-style lockdown" by quarantining nearly a dozen towns of 50,000 people in the provinces of Lombardy and Veneto. Iran, another developing hotspot for the coronavirus as of February 25, came under calls to assume similar lockdown procedures as China and Italy. The security experts such as Gal Luft of the Institute for the Analysis of Global Security in Washington said that "The best way for Iran to deal with the disease is to do precisely what China did – quarantine." and "If Wuhan with its 11 million population can be under quarantine, so can Tehran with its 8 million."

=== Frozen case number ===
Although early cases surrounding an animal market suggested animal-to-human transmission, more evidence surfaced to support the human-to-human transmission of the virus. Despite the expert-led investigation and early signs of human-to-human transmission, including a hospital-acquired infection (nosocomial) case confirmed on 10 January according to Caixin, the local government of Wuhan denied any case of nosocomial infection and maintained that "there was no clear sign of human-to-human transmission" until January 15, when Wuhan's Municipal Health Commission (MHC) said on its website that "the result of present investigation shows no clear evidence of human-to-human transmission, but this does not rule out the possibility of such a transmission. The risk of continuous human-to-human transmission is low."

The reported case number froze at 41 during the Hubei Lianghui and Wuhan Lianghui local parliament sessions between January 6–17, which the local authorities of Hubei and Wuhan said was due to the lack of PCR test kits for the new virus. However, Caixin stated that other sequencing techniques could be used to diagnose the virus within two days, without needing PCR kits. Meanwhile, research groups at Imperial College London and Hong Kong University both estimated over 1000 cases in Wuhan as cases were being exported and confirmed overseas. Perceived discrepancies in the official Chinese data for the number of cases left many netizens doubtful, with some mockingly labeling the virus "patriotic" for its appearance of mainly infecting the Chinese after they left the country.

=== January 26 press meeting ===
Hubei Government's press meeting on January 26 was described as the "scene of a massive car crash" by the BBC, which led to widespread dissatisfaction. Despite the compulsory face mask law, Governor Wang Xiaodong did not wear a face mask, whilst the other two official hosts—Wuhan Mayor Zhou Xianwang and Provincial Party Secretary Bie Bixiong—wore face masks incorrectly. The Governor said that Xiantao, a Hubei city, was capable of producing 10.8 billion masks annually; this was said after he corrected himself twice. While the Governor admitted a severe shortage of medical supplies in Hubei, Mayor Zhou of Wuhan said that the shortage had been fully alleviated.

== Hubei after lockdown ==
After lockdown, Wuhan's streets were silent, except for those around hospitals. A witness described that a "once-bustling city became a ghost town overnight." Although grocery stores and shops remained open, most people stayed at home. The food supply was steady, despite there having been a shortage in the early stages, and the local government promised to provide enough vegetables, rice and meat. Similar scenes were observed in other Hubei cities after lockdown, including Enshi and Shiyan.

=== Overcrowded hospitals and shortages ===
On the first day of the lockdown a large number of febrile patients were queued outside healthcare facilities whilst hospitals and healthcare professional struggled to keep up with the demand. Wuhan MHC admitted that they had a shortage of beds and long outpatient queues. Multiple major Hubei hospitals began to request medical supplies including surgical masks and other protective equipment via social media almost at the same time when Wang Xiaodong, the Governor of Hubei promised to the people that there would be no shortage of supplies in a press conference after lockdown.

On January 22, Hubei Provincial Government said that as of January 31, Hubei Province could only produce 8 million medical masks, 2 million protective clothing and 1,200 infrared thermometers which could not meet the need of the province's epidemic prevention. Hubei Province planned to request support from the Central Government including 40 million medical masks, 5 million protective clothing and 5,000 sets of infrared thermometers. On January 23, the Wuhan CEC set up a 24-hour telephone service to receive donations from all sectors of the society.

On January 26, the Ministry of Industry and Information Technology (MIIT) said at a press conference that Hubei Province needed an estimated 3 million sets of protective clothing per month. The ministry admitted that national production capacity was not meeting demand and promised that in addition to the central reserve, the state was also seeking to purchase overseas equipment such as protective clothing and face masks.

On February 2, Cao Xuejun, MIIT's deputy director general said that around 60% of the mask factories restarted production. They could produce 10 million masks per day. But, the director also acknowledged a gap between production capacity and demand of the key medical and protective products and promised to prioritize Wuhan and Hubei's needs.

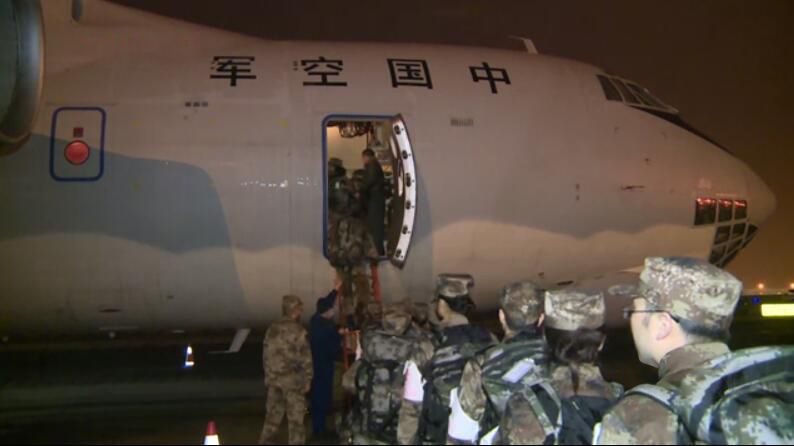
Medical team from Army Medical University was boarding a military Il-76 to leave for Wuhan on 24 January.

=== Makeshift hospitals and laboratories ===
On January 23, the day of Wuhan's lockdown, to relieve the shortage, the municipal government invited China Construction Third Engineering Bureau to build a makeshift hospital that resembled Xiaotangshan Hospital in Beijing during the 2003 SARS outbreak in Caidian, Wuhan. The hospital was later named Huoshenshan Hospital and was expected to be finished by February 3. On the afternoon of 25, Wuhan CEC announced the building of another makeshift hospital with at least 1,300 beds called Leishenshan Hospital.

On February 2, the construction of Huoshenshan Hospital was completed and the hospital was transferred to the military. 1,400 military doctors started to work in the hospital since February 3.

Since Wuhan's healthcare system was overloaded, new laboratories had to be built at a rapid rate. On February 5, a 2000 square meter emergency detection laboratory named "Huo-Yan" (Chinese: 火眼, or "Fire Eye" in English) was opened by BGI, which could process over 10,000 samples a day. The construction was overseen by BGI-founder Wang Jian and took just 5 days. Mathematical modelling has shown cases in Hubei would have been approximately 47% higher, and the corresponding cost of the tackling the quarantine would have doubled, had this testing capacity not been built.

=== Additional resources ===
On January 24, 135 medical workers from Shanghai and 128 from Guangdong were sent to Wuhan to assist the local hospitals. On the evening of that day, 450 medical workers from three military medical universities were deployed to Wuhan on military aircraft. On January 25, the medical workers from different provinces were sent to Wuhan including 138 from Sichuan, 135 from Zhejiang, 138 from Shandong, and 147 from Jiangsu. The NHC also sent experts in intensive medicine to the epidemic areas and formed 6 medical teams with a total of 1230 members to assist Wuhan and another 6 teams waiting for request.

Wuhan hotels offered to help as many medical workers had difficulty arriving at their hospitals due to public transport suspension. On January 24, 85 hotels in Wuhan formed a working group to provide rooms without central air conditioning for medical workers for free. By the noon of January 25, there had been 120 hotels in the group. Major hoteliers such as Tujia, Home Inn, Ziroom, and Danke offered free lodging for the medical workers in Wuhan. There were also people offering free rides to medical workers.

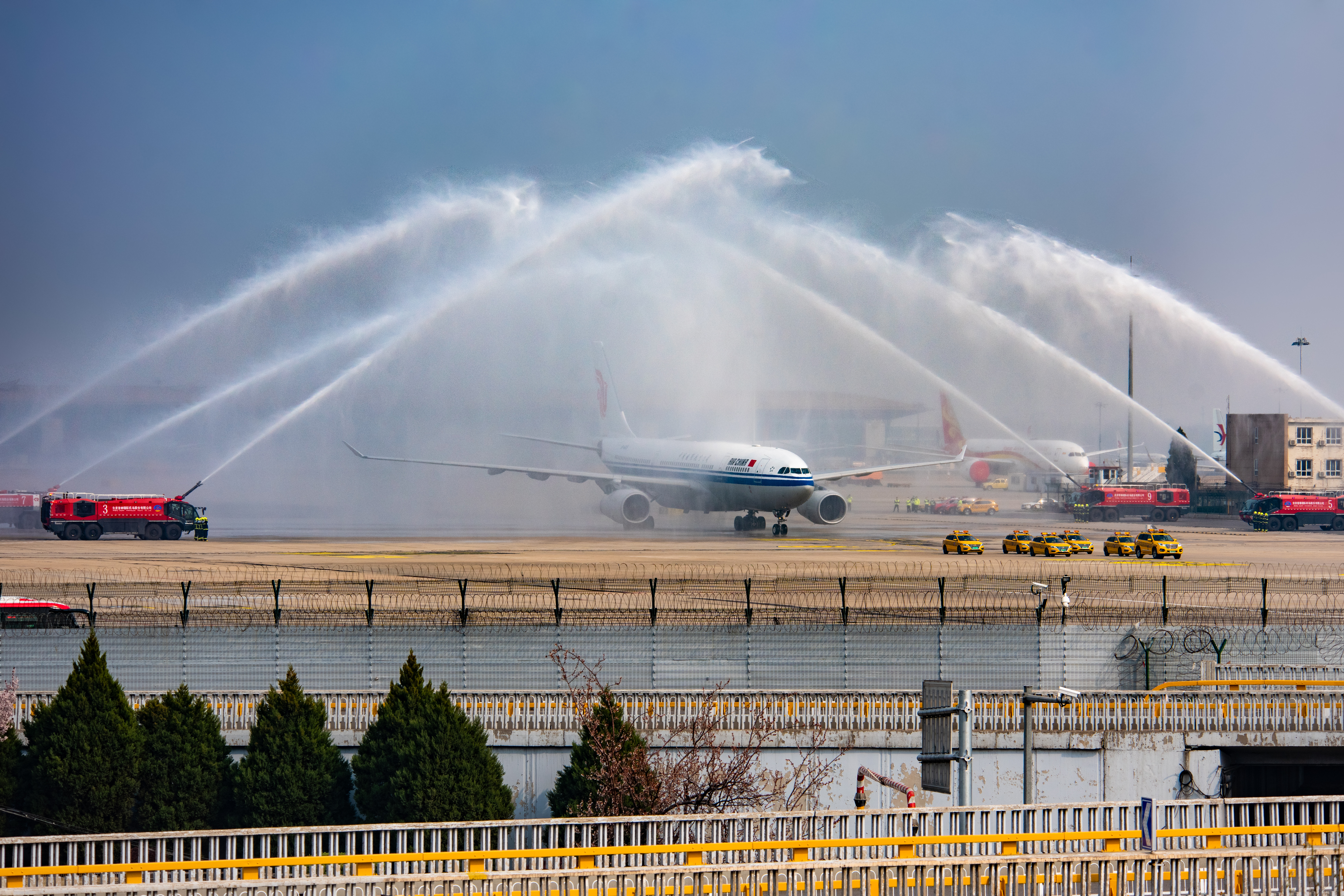
Beijing medical assistance team left Wuhan for Beijing on 31 March 2020

From March 17, the medical assistance teams began to leave Hubei with the easing of domestic epidemic.

==== Encouragement of reporting in Hubei ====
In Fang County, the government issued a notice stating that anyone having a fever would be awarded RMB¥1000 for voluntarily going to a hospital and anyone (Including doctors and the public) who reported someone with a fever would be awarded RMB¥500.

=== Daily life ===
==== Food supplies ====
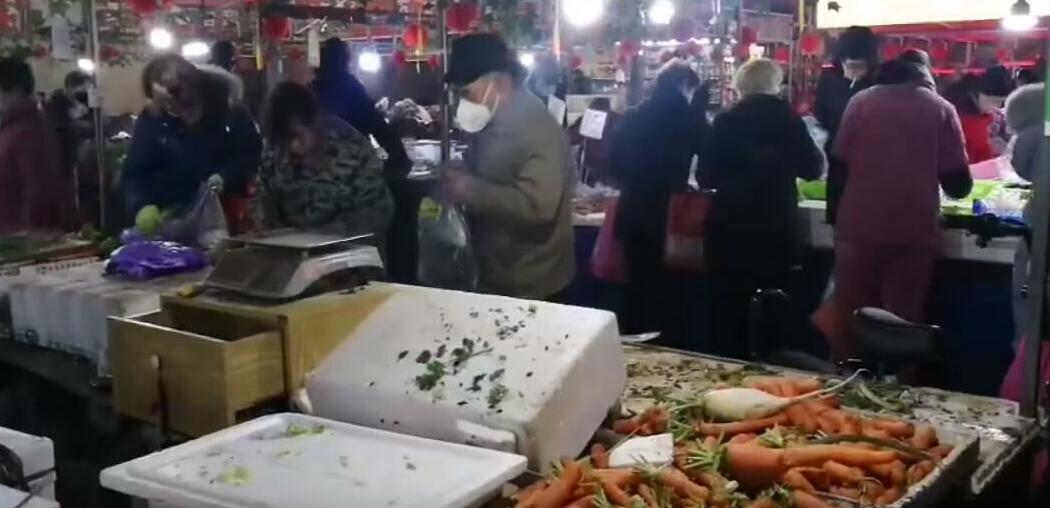
After lockdown, Wuhan citizens were buying vegetables at a market.

Wuhan's local markets saw spikes in food prices shortly after lockdown. Despite calls for price control, the Wuhan CEC stated that commodities, food, medical protection equipment were well-stocked and in smooth supply, appealing to the public not to hoard the goods or buy them at exorbitant prices. According to the Wuhan CEC, there were 5 million kilograms of processed rice, 4,000 tons of edible oil, 5,500 tons of pork, 2,000 tons of halal beef, 1,500 tons of sugar in Wuhan's market while the Government also prepared 16.3 million kilograms of processed rice, 8,000 tons of edible oil, arranged 1.55 million kilograms of eggs, 5 million kilograms of vegetables, 1 million kilograms of fresh fish, 200 tons of halal beef and 6,000 head of pork which would be released orderly through 300 plus supply outlets across the city. After being interviewed by local market regulation administrators, the supermarkets that were reported to have raised food prices normalized the prices.

China Railway Nanchang has been delivering key materials to Wuhan daily since January 25. The first batch of 160 tons of turnips has been transported to Wuhan through the private compartments of T147 and T168 trains. China Railway Hohhot also said that the first batch of 30 tons of potatoes were also sent to Wuhan by K598 and K1278 trains on January 26 to support Wuhan Epidemic Prevention and control.

==== Community services ====
Since the outbreak, several community managers were drafted to the front lines to help local residents with treatment and diagnosis of the virus. With the increasing number of confirmed cases, workloads became tremendous. Around 6000 taxis were allocated to the downtown communities. On January 25, they began providing free service for the residents, under the command of the community committees. Each community was expected to have 3–5 taxis under command. The committees were responsible for offering food and medicine for those who may face difficulties obtaining them on their own.

Although the authority insisted on the role of community services in controlling the epidemic, the help acquired from the government was limited, such that the most they could do was to "file forms and repeatedly report about the patients' conditions," according to a community manager. They had no access to medical resources and not enough manpower and were unable to adequately assist the patients. Most community clinics did not have enough equipment such as protective gear and diagnosis tools to deal with the tasks assigned by the government to conduct preliminary screening for hospitals. Between January 22 and February 1, many patients were turned away without receiving proper medical assistance and quarantine measures as they could not receive a confirmed diagnosis.

=== Easing of lockdown ===
On March 13, Huangshi and Qianjiang became the first Hubei cities to remove strict travel restrictions within part or all of their administrative confines. Activity gradually returned in Wuhan. By March 11, employees in public transport and essential services returned, and by March 18 farmers returned to fields. By late March, some non-essential shops also opened. On March 25, the provincial government removed travel restrictions on most other cities in the province, while, on April 8, those for Wuhan were lifted as well.

On April 17, the Wuhan government revised the number of COVID-19 deaths, accounting for deaths that occurred at home that went previously unreported, as well as the subtraction of deaths that were previously double-counted by different hospitals, resulting in a net increase of 1,290 deaths in the city.

=== Citywide testing ===
Millions of people in Wuhan were tested for the virus in May, using the technique of batch testing, pooling samples to be tested together and retesting individually when necessary.

== Statistics ==
The below progression chart is sourced from Hubei Provincial Health Commission daily reports:
