= Mickens =

Mickens may refer to:

- Mickens House, a historic home in West Palm Beach, Florida, United States

== People with the surname Mickens ==
- Arnold Mickens (1972–2022), American football player
- Carl L. Mickens (born 1960), American politician
- Glenn Mickens (1930–2019), American baseball pitcher
- James Mickens, American computer scientist
- Jaydon Mickens (born 1994), American football wide receiver
- Mike Mickens (born 1987), American football cornerback
- Ray Mickens (born 1973), German-American football cornerback
- R. J. Mickens (born 2001), American football safety
- Ronald E. Mickens (born 1943), American physicist
- Terry Mickens (born 1971), American wide receiver
- Tommy Mickens, fictional character in True Blood
