= Zhuhai Tram =

Light rail rapid transit system in Zhuhai, China

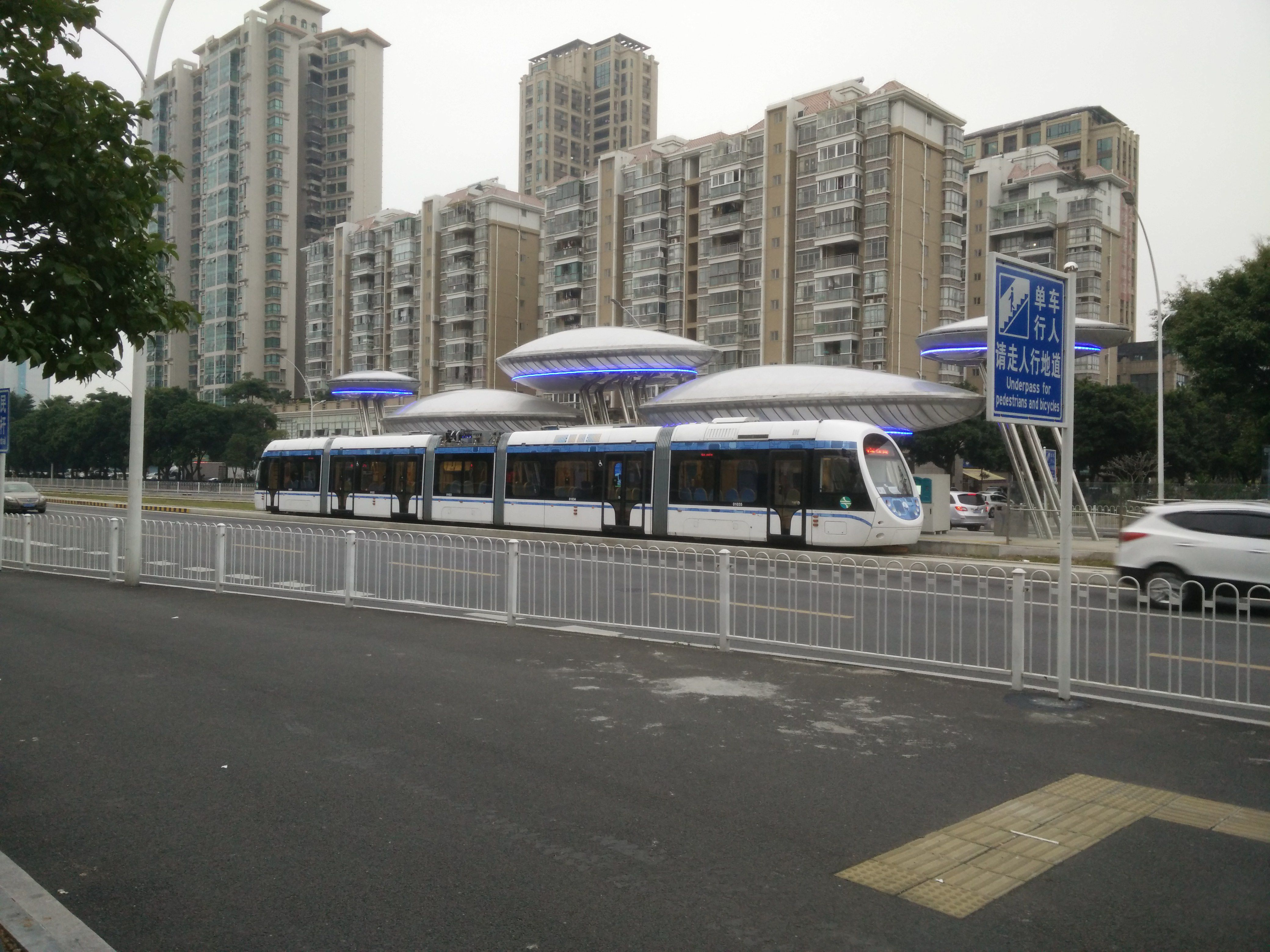

Overview
- Locale: Zhuhai, China
- Transit type: Light rail
- Number of lines: 1 (service suspended); 2 (planned)
- Number of stations: Line 1, Phase 1: 14; Line 2, Phase 2: 25
- Daily ridership: N/A
- Website: zhmrt.com.cn

Operation
- Operators: Zhuhai Urban Transportation Co., Ltd.

Technical
- System length: Line 1, Phase 1: 8.98 km (5.58 mi); Line 1, Phase 2: 19 km (12 mi)
System map
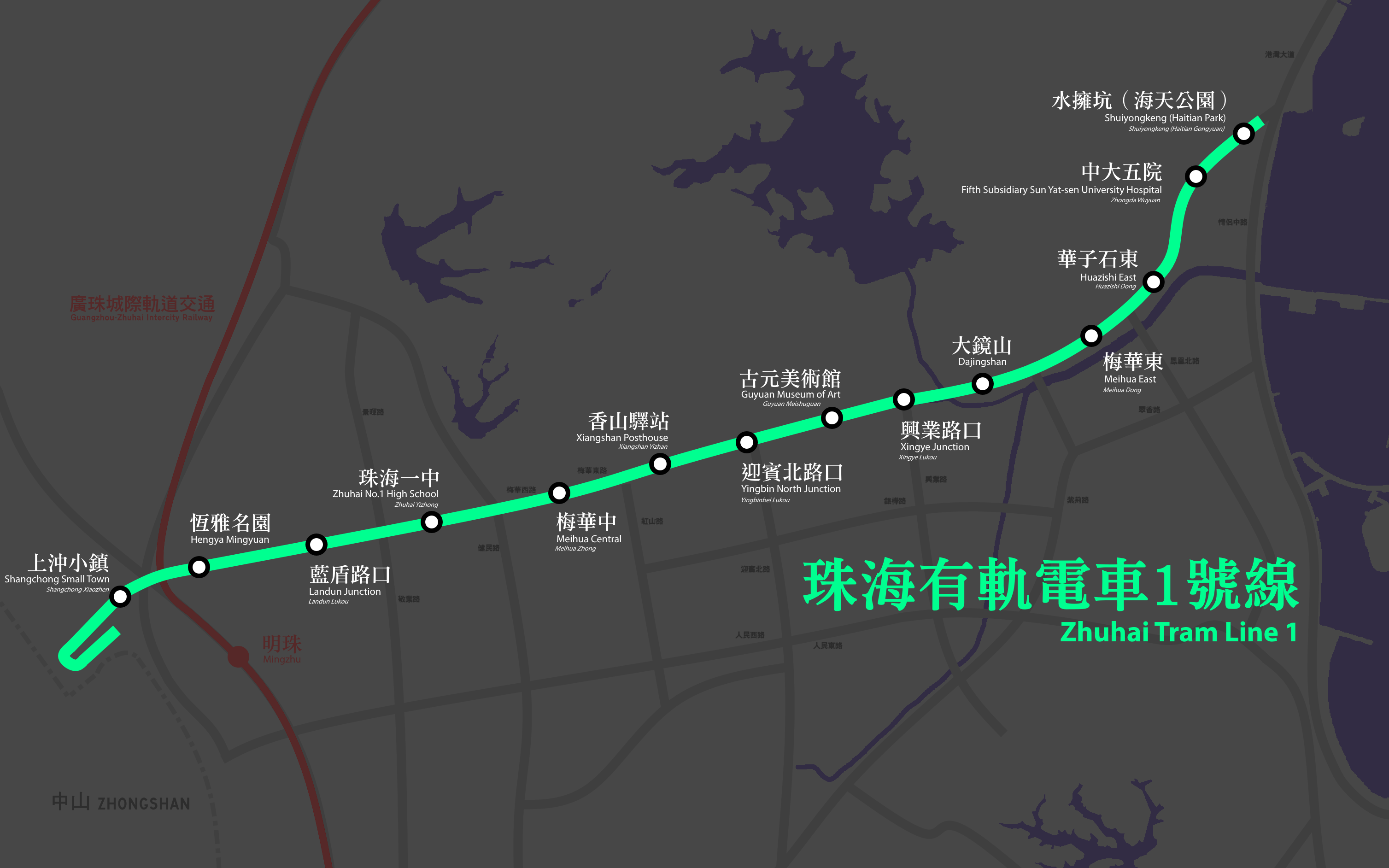

Zhuhai Tram
- Simplified Chinese: 珠海有轨电车
- Traditional Chinese: 珠海有軌電車
Transcriptions
Standard Mandarin
- Hanyu Pinyin: Zhūhǎi Yǒuguǐ Diànchē
Yue: Cantonese
- Jyutping: zyu1 hoi2 jau5 gwai2 din6 ce1

The Zhuhai tram network was a light rail system serving the city of Zhuhai, Guangdong, China. The first section of Line 1 started trial operation on November 7, 2014 with the full line scheduled initially to open by August 2015 and finally opened on June 13, 2017 and runs from Haitian Gardens to Shangchong. However, after facing frequent breakdowns and low passenger flow, the operation of Zhuhai Tram Line 1 was never carried out smoothly and the Government decided to stop its operation in January 2021 and then to dismantle it in May 2024.

A three-line network was planned. Line 1 uses AnsaldoBreda's Sirio trams, license built at CRRC Dalian and was also the first Chinese tram system that uses Ansaldo's catenary-free TramWave electrification system. If completed, it would have connected central Zhuhai to Zhuhai Railway Station and the Gongbei Port of Entry to Macau.

Service on the line was suspended on January 22, 2021 due to low ridership and high operating costs. It is reported that the tram will be dismantled. On May 31, the tram committee voted 15 to 1 to demolish the tram line, due to low operational reliability, high operational cost, lack of services and low passenger levels. The TramWave technology was especially problematic and despite the 11 different modifications to the power supply, it had remained problematic, with accidents related to the power supply system happening on average 0.13 times for every thousand kilometer travelled by all trams combined, and has risen higher every year, with a failure rate of 0.05 in 2017. The power supply was especially vulnerable to rainwater, causing short circuits and electricity leakage.

Despite the demolition being listed as a priority for the city in 2021, the tram line still remained in place. Related infrastructure, such as the signals, ticket machines and platforms all remained in original condition, albeit some had rusted in the three years after service was suspended. When asked by China Business Journal about the plans for the line, the transport department of Zhuhai replied that the question was sensitive and had no comment. CRRC Dalian opposed the closure and had entered talks with the city on restarting the tram network.

On May 7, 2024, the government officially announced the dismantling of tram Line 1 and the restoration of normal road paving. Demolition work began on May 10 and is expected to be completed within one month.

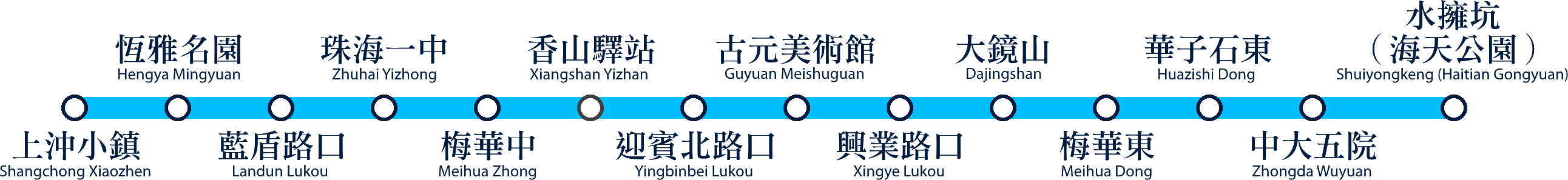
