= Zhengzhou subway flooding =

2021 flood in Zhengzhou, China

Details
- Date: July 20, 2021; Time in China Around 18:00（Coordinated Universal Time10:00）
- Location: China, Henan, Zhengzhou; Zhengzhou MetroLine 5 Beach Temple Station and Shakou Road
- Country: China
- Line: Line 5 (Zhengzhou Metro)
- Operator: Zhengzhou Metro Group Co
- Incident type: Flooding Incident
- Cause: 2021 Henan floods

Statistics
- Trains: 1
- Passengers: 967
- Deaths: 14
- Injured: 5

The Zhengzhou subway flooding incident refers to the severe flooding that occurred on Zhengzhou Metro Line 5 on July 20, 2021, during a heavy rainstorm. Despite the weather, the metro line continued to operate, and rainwater broke through the retaining wall of the Wulongkou parking lot, flooding the train tunnel. Official reports from the government stated that the incident resulted in 14 deaths and 5 injuries. However, the death toll has been widely questioned because the trains were covered with black cloth during the subsequent search and rescue operations, preventing the inspection of their interiors.

== Background ==
Since July 17, 2021, continuous heavy rainfall has caused flooding in various locations in Henan Province, People's Republic of China, including Zhengzhou, Luohe, Kaifeng, Xinxiang, Hebi, and Anyang. Zhengzhou experienced a record-breaking maximum hourly rainfall of 201.9 mm, the highest since meteorological records began. Nineteen weather stations, including Zhengzhou, recorded their highest daily rainfall totals ever. According to the China Meteorological Administration, the main reason for the heavy rain was Typhoon In-fa and the subtropical high pressure system continuously directing a large amount of water vapor to the mainland. This moisture was uplifted by the terrain, such as the Taihang Mountains, leading to heavy rainfall and subsequent flooding in Henan.

Zhengzhou Metro Line 5, which opened in May 2019, is a loop line and was the longest and busiest line in the Zhengzhou metro system at the time of the incident. The affected section (Yueji Park—Shakou Road—Haitansi) crosses Zhengzhou North Station. Zhengzhou North Station, known as "Asia's largest marshalling yard," is quite extensive, and the tunnel passes through this station at a considerable depth. The tunnel between the stations has a topography where the ends near the stations are higher, and the middle is lower. This results in trains descending when leaving a station and ascending when entering one, which is energy-efficient.

According to a regulatory document issued by the Ministry of Transport of the People's Republic of China on October 16, 2019, titled "Urban Rail Transit Operation Management Measures" (Transport Regulation [2019] No. 14), Article 32 stipulates: In case of severe weather, relevant personnel can take measures such as enhancing surveillance, limiting speed, halting operations, or closing stations. If rainfall or flooding causes water to enter the station, severely affecting passenger services, dispatchers can issue a station closure order based on the station's application and organize train bypasses. Trains must not pass if water levels on the track exceed the rail surface.

== Incident ==
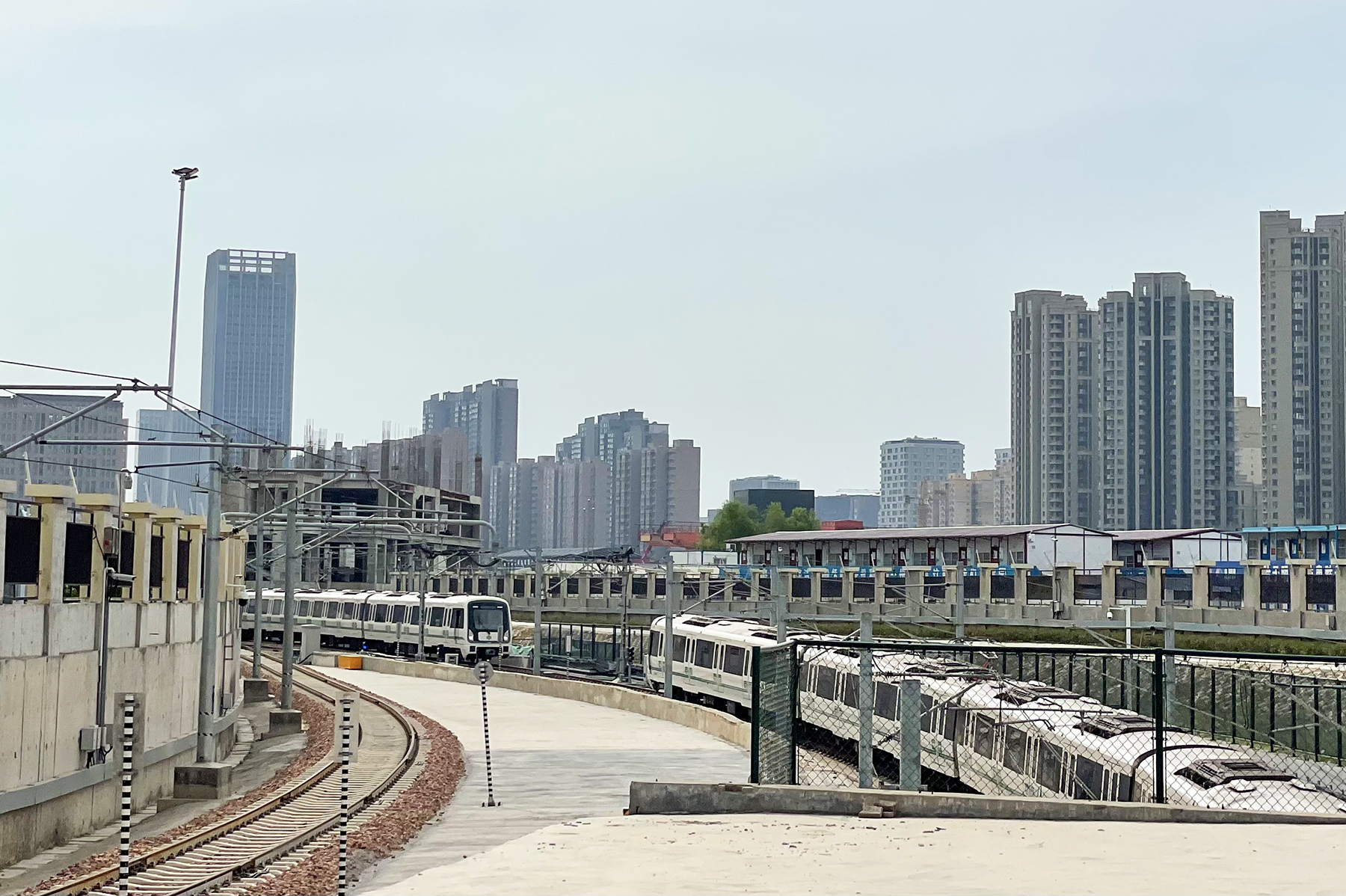
The entrance and exit line of Wulongkou parking lot, where accumulated water broke through the retaining wall and entered the tunnel

On July 16, 2021, heavy rain began to hit Zhengzhou. From 14:00 on July 19 to 14:00 on July 20, the average rainfall in Zhengzhou reached 253 millimeters. The heavy rain caused multiple stations and tunnels of the Zhengzhou Metro to flood. At 18:04 on the 20th, the entire Zhengzhou Metro network ceased operations, and a full evacuation of passengers was ordered. At that time, the water depth in the Wulongkou Parking Lot of Zhengzhou Metro Line 5 was close to 2 meters.

Around 18:00, floodwaters broke through the retaining wall at the entrance and exit lines of Wulongkou Parking Lot, entering the running tunnel between Shakou Road Station and Haitansi Station on Line 5. Simultaneously, train 0501 made an emergency stop in the outer circle direction tunnel between Shakou Road Station and Haitansi Station because the driver found out that the tracks were flooded. Passengers soon noticed this as well. After one minute, train 0501 attempted to return to Haitansi Station but stopped in a low-lying section of the tunnel due to a power cut. Water began to flood the train at 18:30, and passengers attempted to escape via the emergency passageway on the left of the train. However 10 minutes later, the water level rose quickly rendering the emergency passageway unusable, forcing passengers to retreat. Water levels outside the train gradually rose to the height of the train doors and above passengers' chests, reaching as high as their necks at its peak. Some passengers called the mayor's hotline, and others began recording video wills. At 20:00, the sixth car was completely submerged in water. Passenger there thus started to swim to the front. Unfortunately, some drowned because they couldn't swim. Finally at 20:30, the water level gradually went down, and rescue teams saved the surviving passengers.

== Rescue efforts ==
At around 18:00 on the 20th, the Zhengzhou Fire and Rescue Brigade received a report about the trapped train. Upon arriving at the scene, they guided passengers to safety by setting up a rope ladder. Metro employees, emergency rescue teams, police officers, soldiers from the People's Liberation Army, and volunteer rescue teams all participated in the on-site rescue operations. More than 500 people were rescued; 12 died despite rescue efforts and 5 were injured. Some individuals went missing and were not found immediately. The Henan Provincial Government and the Zhengzhou Municipal Government established a special task force to organize search and rescue operations, emergency drainage, and risk mitigation. On the afternoon of July 24 and at 6:30 a.m. on July 25, rescuers found the bodies of two missing passengers. As of the morning of the 27th, no new bodies had been discovered.

== Follow-up events ==
On July 21, 2021, the Ministry of Transport of the People's Republic of China issued an emergency notice, instructing rail transit operators to learn from the recent flooding incidents. The notice called for the adjustment and improvement of emergency plans, including measures such as suspending train operations, evacuating passengers, and closing stations in extreme conditions exceeding design rain intensities. Additionally, the notice emphasized better communication with meteorological departments and strengthened information gathering on flooding and weather disasters. The Ministry specifically stressed that in case of flooding or similar emergencies, operators must strictly follow the "Urban Rail Transit Operation Management Regulations" and suspend operations if safety cannot be ensured.

Yu Yifei, a new trainee at Zhengzhou People's Hospital, was trapped during the severe flooding incident on Zhengzhou Metro Line 5. Being near the carriage exit, he was rescued earlier. Upon reaching the metro exit, he heard many citizens calling for help from behind and decided to return. From that evening until night, Yu Yifei performed CPR continuously for six hours, saving more than ten people. On July 22, in recognition of his actions, Zhengzhou People's Hospital decided to waive his probation period and directly hire him as a full-time employee.

On the evening of July 22, relatives of missing passengers entered the station accompanied by the police to search for their loved ones but found nothing. On July 23, officials from the Zhengzhou Municipal Government, Zhengzhou Health Commission, and Zhengzhou Metro Group held a meeting with the families of the nine confirmed deceased at the Ninth People's Hospital of Zhengzhou. During the meeting, the identities of the nine victims were confirmed. The officials expressed their deep sorrow and informed that the main leaders of Zhengzhou had instructed to expedite the investigation and follow-up actions, with the results to be publicly disclosed.

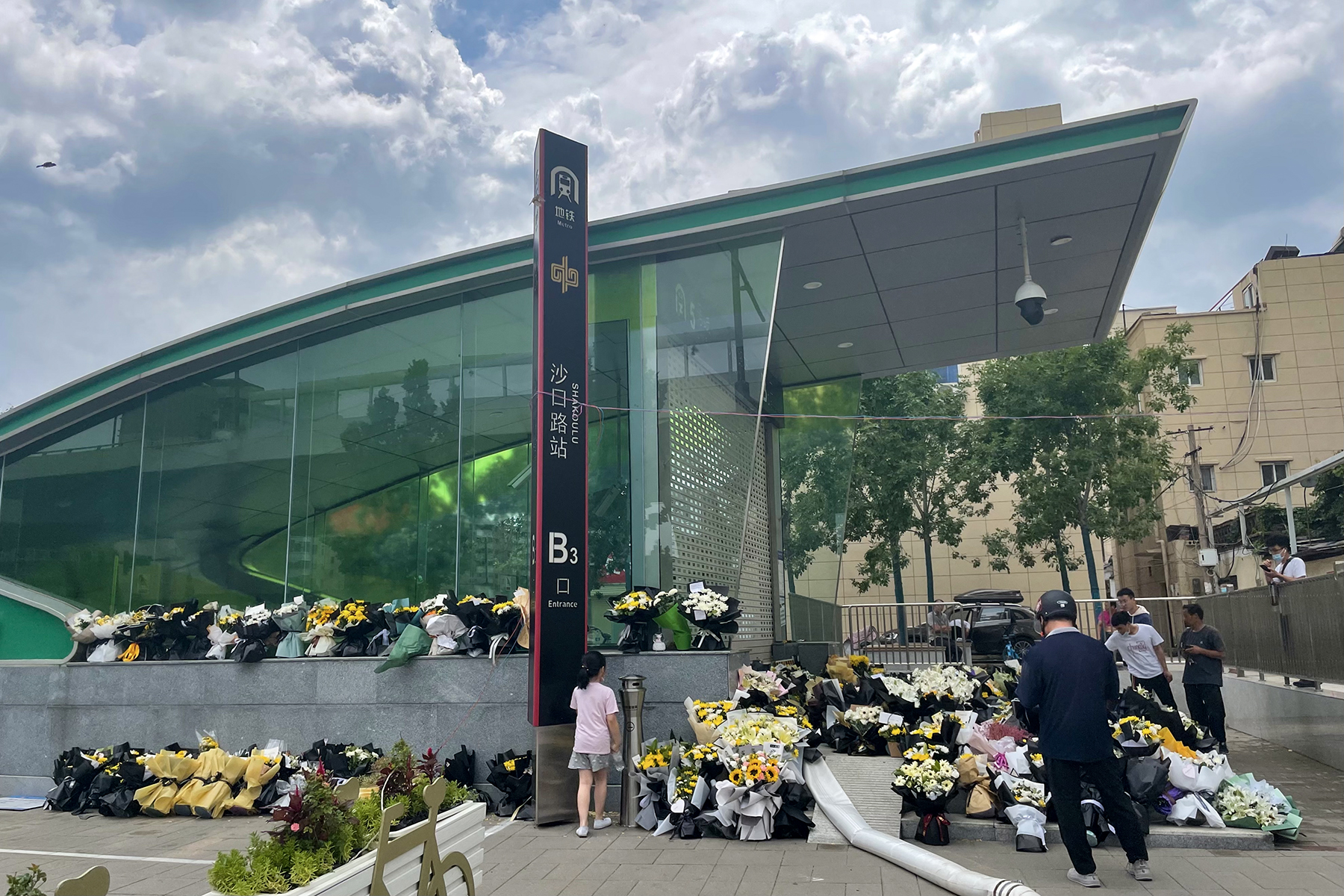
The entrance and exit of Shakou Road Station are piled with flowers to mourn the victims

After the incident, the official website of Zhengzhou Metro turned black and white on the morning of July 21. Many Zhengzhou citizens and witnesses placed flowers at the incident station to mourn the victims. On the seventh day after the incident, the sidewalk in front of Shakou Road Station was piled with flowers left by mourners. Subsequently, the station entrances were surrounded by 1.7-meter-high barriers enclosing the flowers placed on the ground. Later mourners placed flowers outside the barriers. The next day, the barrier directly facing the entrance was removed. On the morning of July 30, Zhengzhou Metro Group held a brief memorial ceremony for the victims at Shakou Road Station and set up a memorial area in a nearby factory yard with free flowers for the public to pay their respects.

On August 2, at a flood prevention and disaster relief press conference in Henan Province, then-mayor of Zhengzhou, Hou Hong, confirmed that 39 people had drowned in underground spaces such as basements, garages, and underground pipelines during the Zhengzhou heavy rain, including 14 victims from Metro Line 5. On the same day, following instructions from Premier Li Keqiang and relevant laws and regulations, the State Council of the People's Republic of China established an investigation team for the "7·20" Zhengzhou catastrophic rainstorm disaster, led by the Ministry of Emergency Management.

== Investigation ==
On January 21, 2022, the State Council investigation team released the "Investigation Report on the '7.20' Catastrophic Rainstorm Disaster in Zhengzhou." The report identified the fatalities on Metro Line 5 as "a responsibility incident caused by extreme rainstorms leading to severe urban flooding. The floodwater destroyed the water barrier wall of the Wulongkou parking lot and inundated the metro tunnel. The Zhengzhou Metro Group Co., Ltd. and relevant parties responded inadequately, mismanaged train operations, illegally altered the Wulongkou parking lot design, and failed to ensure the quality of the water barrier wall construction, resulting in significant casualties." The investigation team identified the following issues:

1. Inadequate Response: Zhengzhou Metro Group failed to take timely pre-warning actions. Multiple sections of Metro Line 5 were flooded in the afternoon, but it was not taken seriously until 18:04 when the train lost power supply, leading to the suspension of the entire network. Passenger evacuation was forcibly interrupted at 18:37, but the metro operation sub-company reported to the headquarters one hour later, delaying the rescue efforts.
2. Train Operation Command and Dispatch Errors: After floodwater entered the metro tunnel, a train was held at Haitansi Station but was later allowed to proceed. When the water reached the track surface, the driver stopped the train, but the dispatcher ordered the train to reverse. Shortly after, the train lost power and was forced to stop, causing the water level inside the train to rise.
3. Illegal Design and Construction:
  1. Unauthorized Design Changes: The metro company altered the design to accommodate property development by relocating the Wulongkou parking lot to a low-lying area without proper approval.
  2. Substandard Water Barrier Wall: The construction unit used temporary barriers instead of a new wall on the western section of the parking lot, which had almost no water-blocking function.
  3. Severely Impaired Drainage Function: The drainage function near the Wulongkou parking lot was significantly compromised. The construction debris from the road on the west side of the open ditch was not cleared, obstructing drainage; additionally, some parts of the open ditch were covered, reducing its water collection capacity.

The responsible individuals, including Wei Ping'an, the project leader for the Wulongkou parking lot construction of Zhengzhou Metro Line 5 from Zhengzhou Metro Group Co., Ltd., and Wang Peng, the project leader of Zhengzhou Metro Line 5 from Beijing Urban Construction Design & Development Group Co., Ltd., were investigated and arrested by the public security authorities for major engineering safety accident crimes and major responsibility accident crimes. Ren Ligong, Party Secretary and Director of the Zhengzhou Emergency Management Bureau; Zhao Yuncheng, Deputy General Manager, Chief Engineer, and Head of the Technical Management Department of Zhengzhou Metro Group Co., Ltd.; and Sun Hongliang, Deputy Section Chief of the Rail Transit Section of the Zhengzhou Construction Quality Supervision Station, were investigated by the disciplinary inspection and supervision agencies and subjected to retention measures for serious disciplinary and legal violations. Additionally, Hou Hong, Deputy Secretary of the Zhengzhou Municipal Committee of the Chinese Communist Party and Mayor, received a serious intra-Party warning and was demoted in administrative rank. Wu Fumin, a member of the Party Leadership Group and Deputy Mayor of the Zhengzhou Municipal Government, was dismissed from his Party and administrative positions. Li Xian and Chen Hongwei, members of the Party Leadership Group and Deputy Mayors of the Zhengzhou Municipal Government, received major demerits in administrative discipline. Other related responsible persons were also subjected to Party and administrative disciplinary actions or admonitions.

== Controversies ==
=== Delayed suspension of operations ===
In response to public concerns about the delayed suspension of operations on the Zhengzhou Metro, the Director of the Safety Department of Zhengzhou Metro Group stated, "For citizens, the metro is the only hope of getting home during severe weather." He mentioned that the goal was to avoid suspension of operations, with ongoing efforts to pump out water and reinforce barriers until 18:00 when they could no longer manage. He also noted that the decision to suspend operations was made by the operating division of the metro company but required approval from the Transportation Commission and the Emergency Management Bureau. A metro operations employee from a southern province of China, interviewed by Southern Weekly, indicated that there is a mechanism for suspending metro operations during heavy rain, but it takes time and often requires approval from higher authorities because "suspension is a social event". Another metro industry professional, interviewed by Duowei News, argued that while natural disasters occur, human error was the primary cause. He criticized the decision-makers for their lack of understanding of the situation and slow response, stating that there were multiple opportunities to address the flooding before it became life-threatening.

=== Train design flaws ===
Metro trains usually have emergency escape doors located at both ends, which, when manually opened, deploy a rescue ladder for passengers to escape through the tracks. Most metro trains in mainland China have this design, but Zhengzhou metro trains do not. Since the launch of Zhengzhou Metro Line 1 in 2012, the absence of escape doors has been controversial. Zhengzhou Metro Group argued that instead of escape doors, they had installed parallel evacuation platforms in the tunnels, allowing passengers to directly evacuate through the train doors, which they claimed to be "more scientific, reasonable, and humane".

According to the China Business Journal, public transport researcher Meng Yi suggested that the lack of escape doors on Zhengzhou metro trains made rescue operations more difficult. He argued that more evacuation channels lead to faster evacuations. The escape door design also helps with air circulation and balancing water pressure inside and outside the train during emergencies, preventing suffocation. During the flooding, the train's buoyancy and movement could have damaged the evacuation platforms, while derailed trains might have blocked these platforms, hindering evacuation. Other urban rail transit researchers believe that having both escape doors and evacuation platforms would provide better emergency evacuation options. Additionally, the sliding doors on Zhengzhou Metro Line 5 trains require outward pushing to open, which becomes difficult under high water pressure in the tunnel.

=== Drainage conditions around Wulongkou parking lot ===
According to Jiemian News, the flooding at Wulongkou parking lot and surrounding areas was not accidental, as this area was known for waterlogging issues even ten years ago. After some improvements, the situation had somewhat bettered. The base of the brick wall at Wulongkou parking lot was higher than the entrance of the open ditch opposite the road. Under normal circumstances, floodwaters should first flow into the ditch and be discharged. During heavy rain, excess water would overflow the roadbed into the ditch, eventually flowing into the Jialu River and the Huai River. However, before this storm, several dozen meters of concrete cover had been added to the open ditch, converting it into an underground river and obstructing drainage.

=== Passengers forced to self-rescue ===
According to Henan Business Daily, Mr. Zong, the husband of a trapped passenger, received a call from his wife around 6 p.m. on the 20th, saying that the train stopped near Shakoulu Station, and water was seeping into the carriage. Zong immediately ran to Shakoulu Station, which was four metro stations away. By 7:30 p.m., his wife informed him that the water in the carriage was up to her neck. Zong encountered flood control personnel on his way and requested to be taken to Shakoulu, but was refused with the explanation that they were "performing a task" and advised to call the fire department or mayor's hotline. Eventually, Zong got onto a city management vehicle, and while on the way, his wife stated that she was starting to suffocate. When Zong arrived at Shakoulu Station, staff at the entrance initially refused him entry, claiming there was no one in the carriage. Zong then made a video call to his wife to show the staff the emergency, but they still denied entry. He had to force his way in. He mentioned that before he arrived, the staff on the second basement level were unaware of the critical situation in the carriage. Meanwhile, passengers in the carriage began breaking windows to self-rescue, and Zong's wife eventually made it back to the platform safely.

=== Obstructed public mourning ===
On July 26, the seventh day after the tragic flooding on Zhengzhou Metro Line 5, many citizens spontaneously went to the entrance of Shakoulu Station to lay flowers in memory of the victims. However, the entrance was surrounded by a 1.7-meter-high barrier, confining the flowers laid by mourners. Later mourners placed flowers outside the barrier. The following day, the barrier directly facing the entrance was removed, allowing citizens to continue laying flowers. Regarding the barrier, Zhengzhou Metro told Urban Express that they were verifying who erected it and would provide details through their official account.

According to Radio France Internationale, on July 26, Chen Liang, a photographer from Caixin Media, was detained by police after photographing people laying flowers at the metro entrance. Another Caixin journalist, Wang Heyan, first reported this incident. Meanwhile, Southern Metropolis Daily journalist Chen Chong was asked by police to delete photos of the flower-laying scene but later restored them at his hotel. On July 28, at Shakoulu Station, a young man from Xi'an using a UAV to film the flower tribute was beaten by unidentified individuals, but local citizens intervened to recover his equipment. Video footage showed people questioning why the young man was not allowed to film and why the truth could not be revealed to the public.

On the first anniversary of the 2021 Henan floods in July 2022, despite the absence of official commemorative events, many citizens laid flowers near the metro station and Jingguang Road Tunnel, where the flooding occurred, to mourn the victims. On Chinese social media, images and videos related to the commemoration were removed or blocked, and the Weibo topic "#One Year Anniversary Of The Henan Zhengzhou 720 Catastrophic Rainstorm" and related images were censored. Several flower shop owners reported being questioned by authorities while delivering flowers, and some flower arrangements were removed shortly after being placed.

== See also ==
- July 2012 Beijing flood
- Typhoon Nari (2001)
- 2020 China floods
