= Abdul–Aziz Yakubu (mathematician) =

Ghanaian-American mathematical biologist (died 2022)

- Born: 4 April 1958; Accra, Ghana
- Died: August 14, 2022 (aged 64)

Academic background
- Education: University of Ghana (BS 1982) University of Toledo (MS 1985) North Carolina State University (PhD 1990)

Academic work
- Discipline: Mathematics
- Sub-discipline: Mathematical biology
- Institutions: Howard University (home institution) University of Minnesota Cornell University

Abdul–Aziz Yakubu (4 April 1958 – 14 August 2022) was a mathematical biologist. Yakubu was a professor at Howard University for over 20 years and served as chair of the mathematics department from 2004 to 2014.

== Early life and education ==
Abdul-Aziz Yakubu was born on 4 April 1958 in Accra, the capital city of Ghana. He attended Accra Academy for high school education. Yakubu became interested in math while studying at the University of Ghana - Legon, where he earned his B.S in mathematics and computer science in 1982. In 1985, Yakubu earned his master's degree in applied mathematics from the University of Toledo in Ohio. Before continuing to Howard University, he attended North Carolina State University and received his doctoral degree in applied mathematics in 1990. For his Ph.D., he wrote his dissertation, "Discrete time competitive systems" under the advisement of John Franke. Yakubu said in a 2020 interview with The Network of Minorities in Mathematical Sciences, "Once you have survived a storm you won’t be bothered by the rain."

== Career ==
Yakubu’s first research experience was at North Carolina State University, and his first faculty position was held at Howard University, a historically black research university (HBCU) in Washington, D.C. While at Howard he spent a year as a long-term visitor by participating in “Mathematics in Biology” at the University of Minnesota. The program at the University of Minnesota allowed him to make connections to further his positive contributions to the world, especially his research on infectious diseases in Africa. Two years after his long-term visit, he took a two-year leave from Howard University in 2002 to visit the Department of Statistics and Computational Biology at Cornell University, where he collaborated with Carlos Castillo-Chavez.

After his Cornell experience, he returned to Howard University to focus on mathematical biology. Yakubu had a successful collaboration in scholarly work on exploited fisheries with scientists at the Northeast Fisheries Science Center of Woods Hole, Massachusetts. He worked on projects that investigated biodiversity and infectious diseases with Avner Friedman of the Mathematical Bioscience Institute students at Ohio State University and his graduate students at Howard University. His research on mathematical biology helped him connect with students and researchers internationally. Yakubu has attended and presented his contributions at several research conferences and workshops in Europe and Asia. The National Science Foundation funded DIMACS-MBI Africa initiative, led by Avner Friedmann, Marty Golubitsky, Fred Roberts as well as the NSF-funded Masamu project of Overton Jenda. It made it possible for him to give several lectures in Cameroon, Ghana, Morocco, South Africa, Uganda, and Zambia. Yakubu left on sabbatical leave to MBI.DIMACS in Piscataway, New Jersey, MBI in Columbus, Ohio, NIMBioS in Knoxville, Tennessee, and similar mathematical biology institutes.

Yakubu was a mentor towards many students of color. He supervised 7 PhD dissertations done by students of underrepresented backgrounds and was an advocate for diversity and inclusion and encouraged the participation of Historically Black Colleges and Universities (HBCU) in fields such as mathematical sciences.

Yakubu published his research in several academic journals like the Bulletin of Mathematical Biology, Journal of Mathematical Biology, Mathematical Biosciences, SIAM and Journal of Applied Mathematics. He was a member and held leadership roles in professional mathematics organizations, including the Society for Mathematical Biology, Mathematical Bioscience Institute of the Ohio State and DIMACS of Rutgers University. From 2007 to 2016, he served as Chair of the World Outreach Committee of the Society for Mathematical Biology.

Yakubu died on August 14, 2022. As of November 2022, the editors of the Journal of Biological Dynamics are working on a special issue to be published in remembrance of Yakubu. The special edition will cover topics inspired by or related to Yakubu's work in mathematics and population biology. On 6–7 April 2024, during the Spring Eastern Sectional Meeting at Howard University in Washington, D.C., the American Mathematical Society held a Special Session on the Mathematics of Infectious Diseases in memory of Dr. Yakubu. Over the two days, 19 presentations were made in his honor.

== Personal life ==
Though details about his personal life are scarce, when asked his pinnacle private achievement, Abdul-Aziz Yakubu proudly claimed that nothing compared to marrying his beloved wife.

== Selected publications ==
- Mathematical Approaches For Emerging and Reemerging Infectious Diseases: Models, Methods and Theory, Springer-Verlag, Volume 125, Edited by Carlos Castillo-Chavez with Sally Blower, Pauline van den Driessche, Denise Kirschner and Abdul-Aziz Yakubu (2002)
- Mathematical Approaches For Emerging and Reemerging Infectious Diseases: Models, Methods and Theory, Springer-Verlag, Volume 126, Edited by Carlos Castillo-Chavez with Sally Blower, Pauline van den Driessche, Denise Kirschner and Abdul-Aziz Yakubu (2002)
