= Joaquín Bustoz Jr. =

American mathematician (1939–2003)

Joaquín Bustoz Jr. (1939–2003) was an American mathematician who worked as a professor of mathematics at Arizona State University. His mathematical research concerned classical analysis, including Fourier analysis, summability methods, univalent function, orthogonal polynomials and special functions. He made contributions to all of these topics, most notably in collaboration with Mourad Ismail, Sergei Suslov and with his PhD students Luís Daniel Abreu, José Luis Cardoso and Luis Gordillo. But he was primarily known as a mentor to underrepresented minorities in mathematics.

Bustoz was born in Tempe, Arizona; his parents worked on the local farms and also for the Tempe Elementary School District, which eventually named the Joaquin and Ramona Bustoz Elementary School after them. He graduated from Arizona State University in 1962 with a degree in mathematics, and after two years in California working for Univac returned to ASU, where he completed a doctorate in 1967 under the supervision of Walter Tandy Scott. After teaching at the University of Cincinnati from 1969 to 1976, during which he also spent a year at the National University of Colombia as a Fulbright Scholar, he returned to ASU again as an associate professor in 1976, and was promoted to full professor in 1978. He chaired the ASU mathematics department from 1982 to 1985.

In 1985, Bustoz founded the Summer Math–Science Honors program for high school students, which continues at ASU as the Joaquin Bustoz Math–Science Honors Program. Bustoz also worked on mathematics education on the Navajo Nation and the Pima reservations. For his efforts, president Bill Clinton honored him in 1996 with the Presidential Award for Excellence in Science, Mathematics and Engineering Mentoring.

He was killed by a car accident on August 13, 2003. As well as the Math–Science Honors program, the Joaquin Bustoz Jr. Professorship at ASU, held by Carlos Castillo-Chavez, is named after Bustoz.
