= Carlos Castillo-Chavez =

Mexican-American mathematician (born 1952)

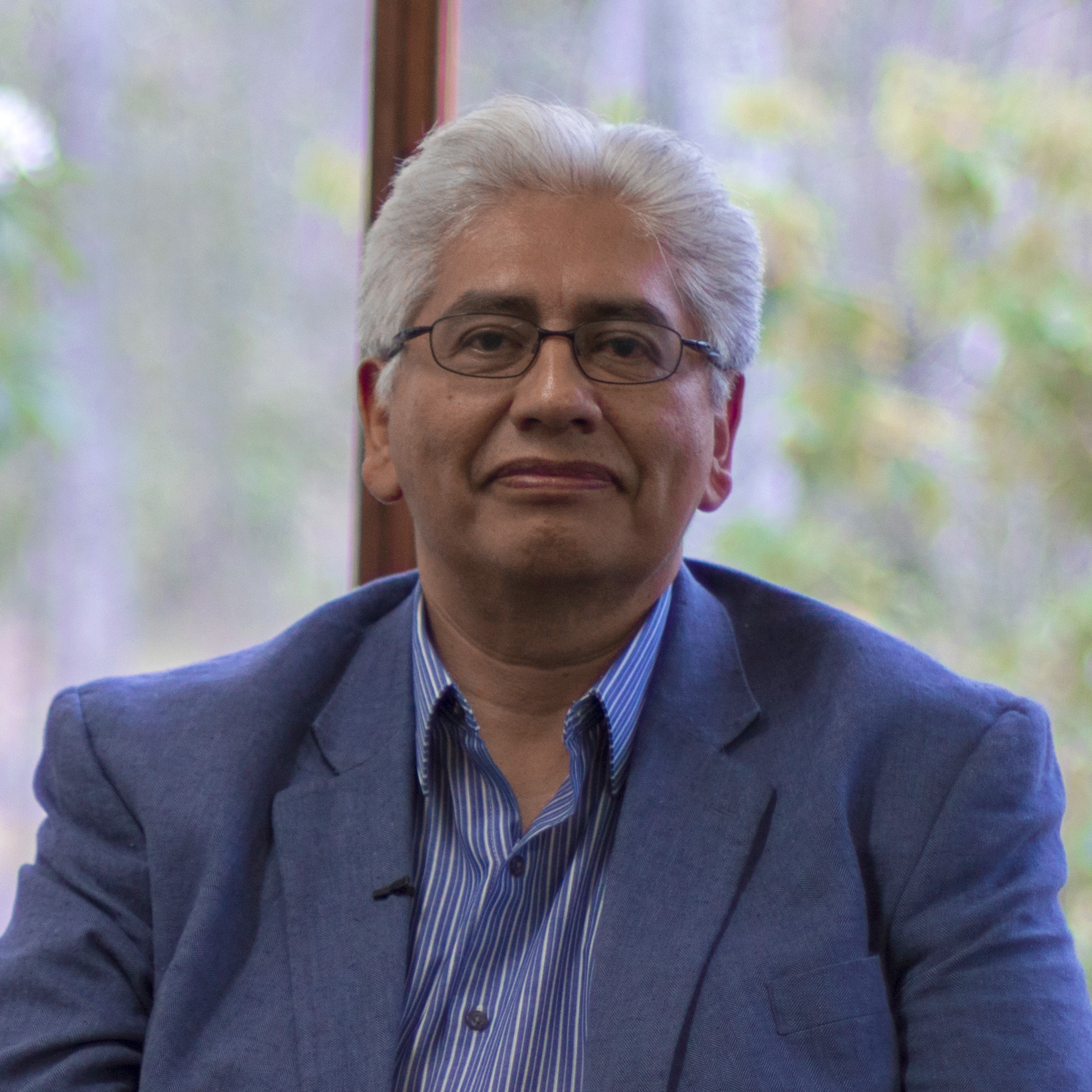
- Castillo-Chavez in 2017
- Born: March 29, 1952 (age 74); Mexico
- Education: University of Wisconsin–Madison (PhD) University of Wisconsin–Milwaukee (M.S.) University of Wisconsin–Stevens Point (B.A.)
- Scientific career
- Fields: Mathematics, Biology
- Workplaces: Arizona State University; Brown University; Cornell University; Santa Fe Institute
- Thesis: Linear and Nonlinear Deterministic Character-Dependent Models with Time Delay in Population Dynamics (1984)
- Doctoral advisor: Fred Guenther Brauer
- Doctoral students: Gerardo Chowell

Carlos Castillo-Chavez (born March 29, 1952) is a Mexican-American mathematician. He held positions as a Regents Professor and the Joaquín Bustoz Jr. Professor of Mathematical Biology at Arizona State University. Castillo-Chavez founded the Mathematical and Theoretical Biology Institute (MTBI) at Cornell University in 1996. His research and publications focus on mathematics, social structures, and epidemiology.

== Biography ==
Carlos Castillo-Chavez was born on March 29, 1952, in Mexico, immigrating to the United States in 1974, at age 22. He worked in a cheese factory in Wisconsin before continuing his studies. He attended the University of Wisconsin–Stevens Point, graduating in 1976 with degrees in mathematics and Spanish literature. He earned a MS in Mathematics from the University of Wisconsin–Milwaukee. He earned a Ph.D. in mathematics from the University of Wisconsin–Madison in 1984. Before joining Arizona State University in 2004, he was a professor at Cornell University for 18 years. He has published scientific articles and books, and served on committees for organizations such as the National Science Foundation, the Alfred P. Sloan Foundation, the National Institutes of Health, the Society for Industrial and Applied Mathematics, and the American Mathematical Society. From 2016 to 2018, he served as rector of Yachay Tech University in Ecuador.

A In 2006, Arizona State University described him as an expert in epidemiological modeling, and a contributor to the literature on the progression of diseases.

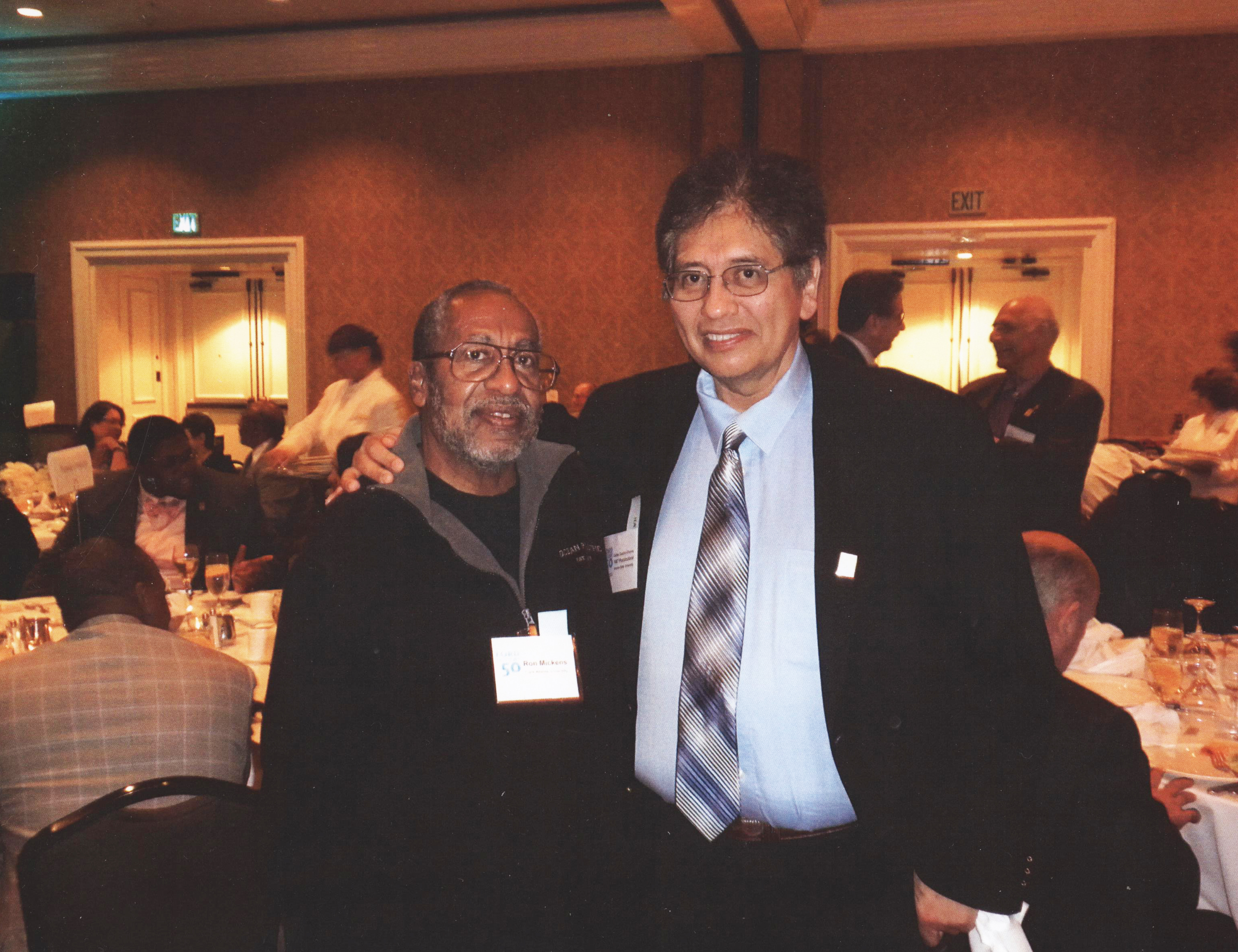
Carlos Castillo-Chavez (right) and physicist Ronald E. Mickens at a banquet during the 2012 Ford Fellows Conference

According to a September 2020 update, his 52 PhD students included 21 women, 29 from U.S. underrepresented groups, and 7 from Latin America. He also mentored over 500 undergraduates, primarily through the Mathematical and Theoretical Biology Institute. He has been recognized for work aimed at enhancing academic success, and for providing research opportunities for underrepresented groups in mathematics and biology. According to the Mathematics Genealogy Project, Castillo-Chavez is listed as one of the top doctoral advisors in mathematics, and is noted as the only Latino mathematician in their top 250 list.

In 2020, he retired from Arizona State University after resigning from his posts the previous year. An ASU investigation substantiated a graduate student report that he created a hostile environment and engaged in harassment, but the matter was closed without further action upon his retirement. According to reporting on the investigation, his "tough love" approach was cited by both supporters and detractors as a source of support and conflict, respectively.

Castillo-Chavez founded the Applied Mathematics in the Life and Social Sciences BS and PhD programs (2008) at the Simon A. Levin Mathematical, Computational, and Modeling Sciences Center at Arizona State University.

Castillo-Chavez established the Mathematical and Theoretical Biology Institute (MTBI) at Cornell University in 1996. It moved to Arizona State University in the spring of 2004. From 1996 to 2004, MTBI received funding from Cornell University and Los Alamos National Laboratory (T-Division). The National Science Foundation, the National Security Agency, and Arizona State University have also provided partial funding. As of 2021-2022, it was renamed the Quantitative Research in the Life and Social Sciences Program (QRLSSP).

Castillo-Chavez was also the director of the Institute for Strengthening and the Joaquin Bustoz Math-Science Honors Program (JBMSHP), a summer residential mathematics program for students interested in academic careers requiring mathematics, science, or engineering-based coursework, particularly those from underrepresented groups.

== Research ==
Castillo-Chavez has co-authored over 560 publications and a dozen books, including textbooks, research monographs, and edited volumes. His research explores the intersection of the mathematical, natural, and social sciences, focusing on how dynamic social landscapes affect disease dispersal, evolution, and control, as well as the impact of environmental risk, social structures, and human behavior on disease dynamics, including addiction.

He and his collaborators have introduced mathematical models for the spread of scientific concepts, ideas, or media-driven information, such as the social contagion effect in recurrent mass killings and school shootings. They have also studied the role of behavior and mobility in the dynamics of emergent and re-emergent diseases, including Ebola, influenza, tuberculosis, and Zika virus. His publications have also included models and frameworks for collaborative learning based on the activities of the ASU Mathematical and Theoretical Biology Institute.

== Awards and recognition ==
His awards and recognition include:

- Three White House Awards (1992, 1997, and 2011). His MTBI program received the Presidential Awards for Excellence in Science, Mathematics and Engineering Mentoring (PAESMEM).
- The 12th American Mathematical Society Distinguished Public Service Award in 2010.
- The 2007 Mentor Award from the American Association for the Advancement of Science (AAAS).
- The 17th recipient of the SIAM Prize for Distinguished Service to the Profession.
- Member of the Board of Higher Education at the National Academy of Sciences (2009-2015) and served on President Barack Obama's Committee on the National Medal of Science (2010-2015).
- Fellow of the American Association for the Advancement of Science; Society for Industrial and Applied Mathematics; Founding Fellow of the American Mathematical Society; and American College of Epidemiology.
- Held honorary Professorships at Xi'an Jiatong University in China, the Universidad de Belgrano in Argentina, and East Tennessee State University. Past appointments include a Stanislaw M. Ulam Distinguished Scholar at Los Alamos National Laboratory, a Cátedra Patrimonial at UNAM in México, and a Martin Luther King Jr. Professorship at MIT.
- On February 24, 2016, the University Francisco Gavidia inaugurated the Centro de Modelaje Matemático Carlos Castillo-Chavez in the City of San Salvador, El Salvador.
- Served on NSF's Advisory Committee for Education and Human Resources (2016-2019) and on NSF's Cyber Infrastructure Advisory Boards (2016-2019).
- The inaugural recipient of the William Yslas Velez Outstanding STEM Award, co-sponsored by the Victoria Foundation and the Pasqua Yaqui Tribe of Arizona (2015).
- Elected as a Member-at-Large of the Section on Mathematics of the AAAS (2016–2020).
- In April 2017, Brown University invited Castillo-Chavez to present a lecture in the Series "Thinking Out Loud," titled "The Role of Contagion in the Building and Sustainability of Communities."
- Pete C. Garcia, Victoria Foundation - Higher Education Award. Outstanding Latina/o Faculty: Research in Higher Education Award. September 4, 2019.

== Appointments ==
Primary Affiliations have included:

- School of Human Evolution and Social Change, Arizona State University
- Global Institute of Sustainability, Distinguished Sustainability Scientist, Arizona State University
- Founding Director Simon A. Levin Mathematical, Computational & Modeling Sciences Center, Arizona State University
- ASU-SFI Center for Biosocial Complex Systems
- Center for Gender Equity in Science and Technology, Arizona State University
- External Santa Fe Institute, External Faculty Member
- Biological Statistics and Computational Biology, Cornell University - Adjunct Faculty

== Selected publications ==
Books

- Carlos Castillo-Chavez, Fred Brauer, Zhilan Feng (2019). Mathematical Models in Epidemiology. New York: Springer. ISBN 9781493998265
- Carlos Castillo-Chavez, Fred Brauer (2013). Mathematical Models for Communicable Diseases. SIAM. ISBN 9781611972412
- Clemence, Dominic; Gumel, Abba; Castillo-Chávez, Carlos; Mickens, Ronald E. (2006). Mathematical studies on human disease dynamics: emerging paradigms and challenges: AMS-IMS-SIAM Joint Summer Research Conference, competitive mathematical models of disease dynamics: emerging paradigms and challenges, July 17–21, 2005, Snowbird, Utah. Providence, Rhode Island: American Mathematical Society. ISBN 0-8218-3775-3.
- Castillo-Chávez, Carlos (2003). Bioterrorism: mathematical modeling applications in homeland security. Philadelphia: Society for Industrial and Applied Mathematics. ISBN 0-89871-549-0.
- Blower, Sally; Castillo-Chávez, Carlos (Ed) (2002). Mathematical approaches for emerging and reemerging infectious diseases: an introduction. Berlin: Springer. ISBN 0-387-95354-X.
- Castillo-Chávez, Carlos; Brauer, Fred (2001). Mathematical models in population biology and epidemiology. Berlin: Springer. ISBN 0-387-98902-1.
- Carlos Castillo-Chavez (editor) (1989). Mathematical and Statistical Approaches to AIDS Epidemiology. Springer-Verlag Berlin Heidelberg. ISBN 978-3-540-52174-7

Scientific articles

- Castillo-Chavez Carlos, Derdei Bichara, and Benjamin R Morin. Perspectives on the role of mobility, behavior, and time scales in the spread of diseases. Proceedings of the National Academy of Sciences, 113(51):14582–14588, 2016.
- Chowell, D., C. Castillo-Chavez, S Krishna, X Qiu, Modelling the effect of early detection of Ebola- The Lancet Infectious Diseases, 15(2): 148--149, 2015
- Carlos Castillo-Chavez, Roy Curtiss, Peter Daszak, Simon A. Levin, Oscar Patterson-Lomba, Charles Perrings, George Poste, and Sherry Towers. Beyond Ebola: lessons to mitigate future pandemics. The Lancet Global Health 3 (7), e354-e355. 2015
- Eli P. Fenichel, Carlos Castillo-Chavez, M. G. Ceddia, Gerardo Chowell, Paula A. Gonzalez Parra, Graham J. Hickling, Garth Holloway, Richard Horan, Benjamin Morin, Charles Perrings, Michael Springborn, Leticia Velazquez, and Cristina Villalobos, "Adaptive human behavior in epidemiological models", Proceedings of the National Academy of Sciences PNAS, USA 2011; 108:6306-11
- Castillo-Chavez, C. and B. Song: "Dynamical Models of Tuberculosis and applications", Journal of Mathematical Biosciences and Engineering, 1(2): 361-404, 2004.
- Castillo-Chavez C., Z. Feng and W. Huang. "On the computation Ro and its role on global stability", Mathematical Approaches for Emerging and Reemerging Infectious Diseases: An Introduction, IMA Volume 125, 229-250, Springer-Verlag, Berlin-Heidelberg-New York. Edited by Carlos Castillo-Chavez with Pauline van den Driessche, Denise Kirschner and Abdul-Aziz Yakubu, 2002.
- Chowell, G., Hengartner, N.W., Castillo-Chavez, C., Fenimore, P.W., Hyman, J.M. "The Basic Reproductive Number of Ebola and the Effects of Public Health Measures: The Cases of Congo and Uganda". Journal of Theoretical Biology, 229(1): 119-126 (July 2004)
