= Zhilan Feng =

Chinese-American mathematical biologist

Zhilan Julie Feng
- Born: 1959 (age 66–67)
- Education: Jilin University, Arizona State University
- Occupation: Applied mathematician

Zhilan Julie Feng (born 1959) is a Chinese-American applied mathematician whose research topics include mathematical biology, population dynamics, and epidemiology. She is a professor of mathematics at Purdue University, and a program director in the Division of Mathematical Sciences at the National Science Foundation.

== Education and career ==
Feng studied mathematics at Jilin University in China, earning a bachelor's degree in 1982 and a master's degree in 1985. She came to Arizona State University for graduate study, completing her Ph.D. in 1994. Her dissertation, A Mathematical Model for the Dynamics of Childhood Diseases Under the Impact of Isolation, was supervised by Horst R. Thieme.

After her postdoctoral study at Cornell University, she joined Purdue University as an assistant professor in 1996. She was promoted to full professor in 2005, and became a program director at the National Science Foundation in 2019.

== Recognition ==
Feng was named a Fellow of the American Mathematical Society, in the 2022 class of fellows, "for contributions to applied mathematics, particularly in biology, ecology, and epidemiology".

== Books ==
Feng's books include:

- Disease Evolution: Models, Concepts, and Data Analyses (American Mathematical Society, 2006, edited with Ulf Dieckmann and Simon A. Levin)
- Applications of Epidemiological Models to Public Health Policymaking: The role of heterogeneity in model predictions (World Scientific, 2014)
- Mathematical Models of Plant-Herbivore Interactions (Chapman & Hall / CRC, 2018, with Donald DeAngelis)
- Mathematical Models in Epidemiology (Springer, 2019, with Fred Brauer and Carlos Castillo-Chavez)
