= Ronald E. Mickens =

American physicist (born 1943)

Ronald Elbert Mickens
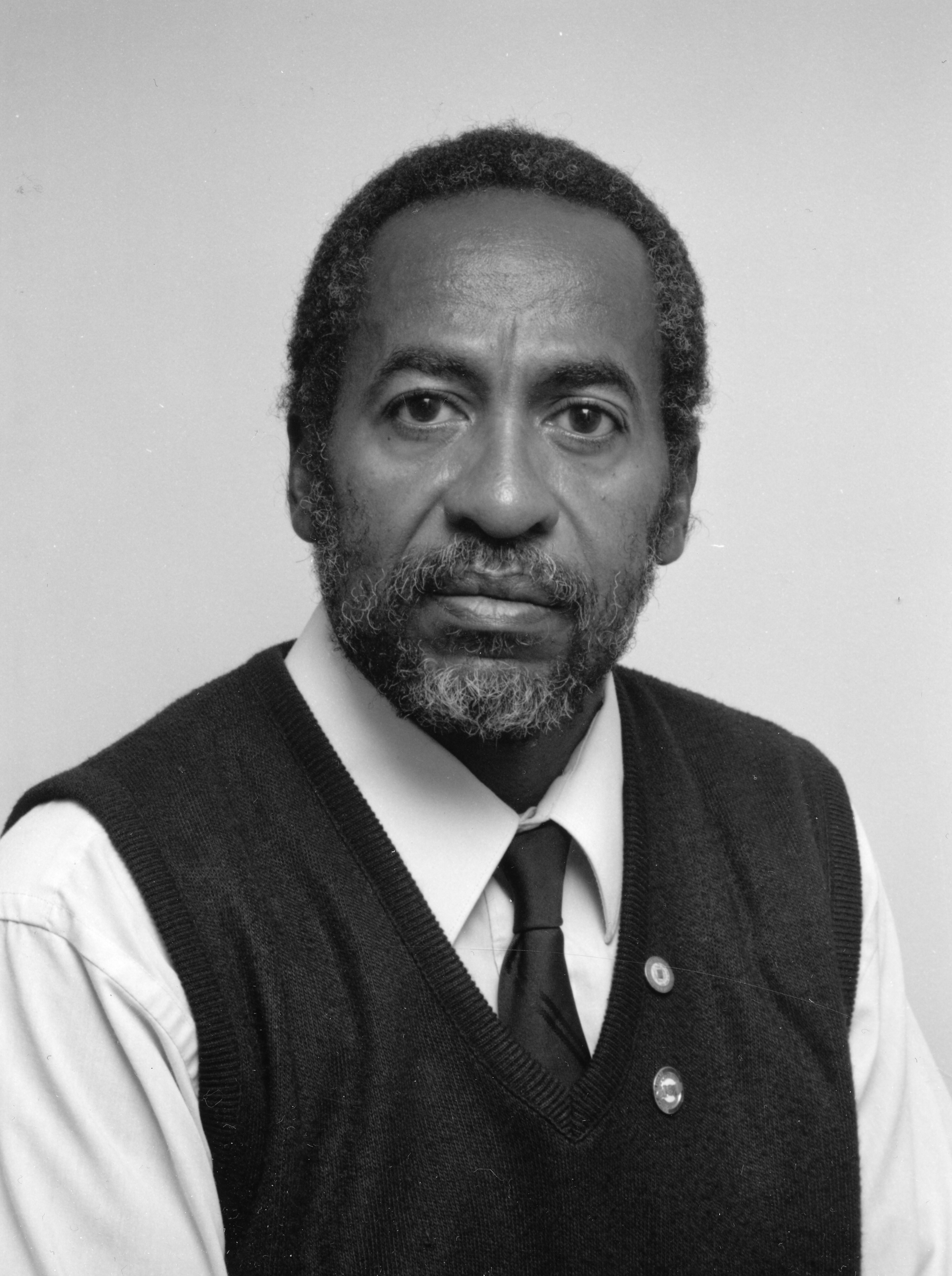
- Born: February 7, 1943 (age 83); Petersburg, Virginia, United States
- Education: Fisk University, Vanderbilt University
- Alma mater: Fisk University
- Known for: Scattering theory, Nonlinear oscillations, Difference equations, NSFD Schemes, Generalized trigonometric functions, History of science, Mathematical biology
- Children: James Mickens
- Scientific career
- Fields: Physics Applied mathematics
- Workplaces: Clark Atlanta University, Fisk University
- Thesis: Branch Points in the Complex Angular Momentum Plane
- Doctoral advisor: Wendell G. Holladay

Ronald Elbert Mickens (born February 7, 1943) is an American physicist and mathematician who is the Fuller E. Callaway Professor of Physics at Clark Atlanta University. His research focuses on nonlinear dynamics and mathematical modeling, including modeling epidemiology. He also has an interest in the history of science and has written on the history of black scientists. He is a fellow of the American Physical Society and served as the historian of the National Society of Black Physicists. He has made significant contributions to the theory of nonlinear oscillations and numerical analysis.

== Early life and education ==
Ronald Elbert Mickens was born February 7, 1943, in Petersburg, Virginia, to Joseph P. Mickens, a general construction worker, and Daisy Brown Williamson Mickens who was a part-time domestic worker. The eldest of three children, Mickens was raised primarily by his maternal grandparents. It was through discussions with his grandfather, James Williamson, that Mickens was inspired to become a scientist at age six and has credited his grandfather with his early interest in science. Mickens attended Fisk University as an undergraduate and graduated in 1964 with degrees in mathematics and physics. He received his Ph.D. in theoretical physics in 1968 from Vanderbilt University and subsequently worked as a postdoctoral fellow at MIT. His studies at Vanderbilt were supported by fellowships from the Danforth Foundation and the Woodrow Wilson Foundation. Continuing his research efforts, he received a National Science Foundation Postdoctoral Fellowship to investigate elementary particle physics at the Massachusetts Institute of Technology.

== Academic career ==
Mickens returned to Fisk University as a faculty member in 1970 and later worked at the Joint Institute for Laboratory Astrophysics, from which he was recruited to what was then Atlanta University in 1981. He became a Callaway Professor in 1986. Mickens was elected a Fellow of the American Physical Society in 1999, with the citation "For his sustained service to the physics community and his original contributions on the applications of mathematics to the study of physical systems."

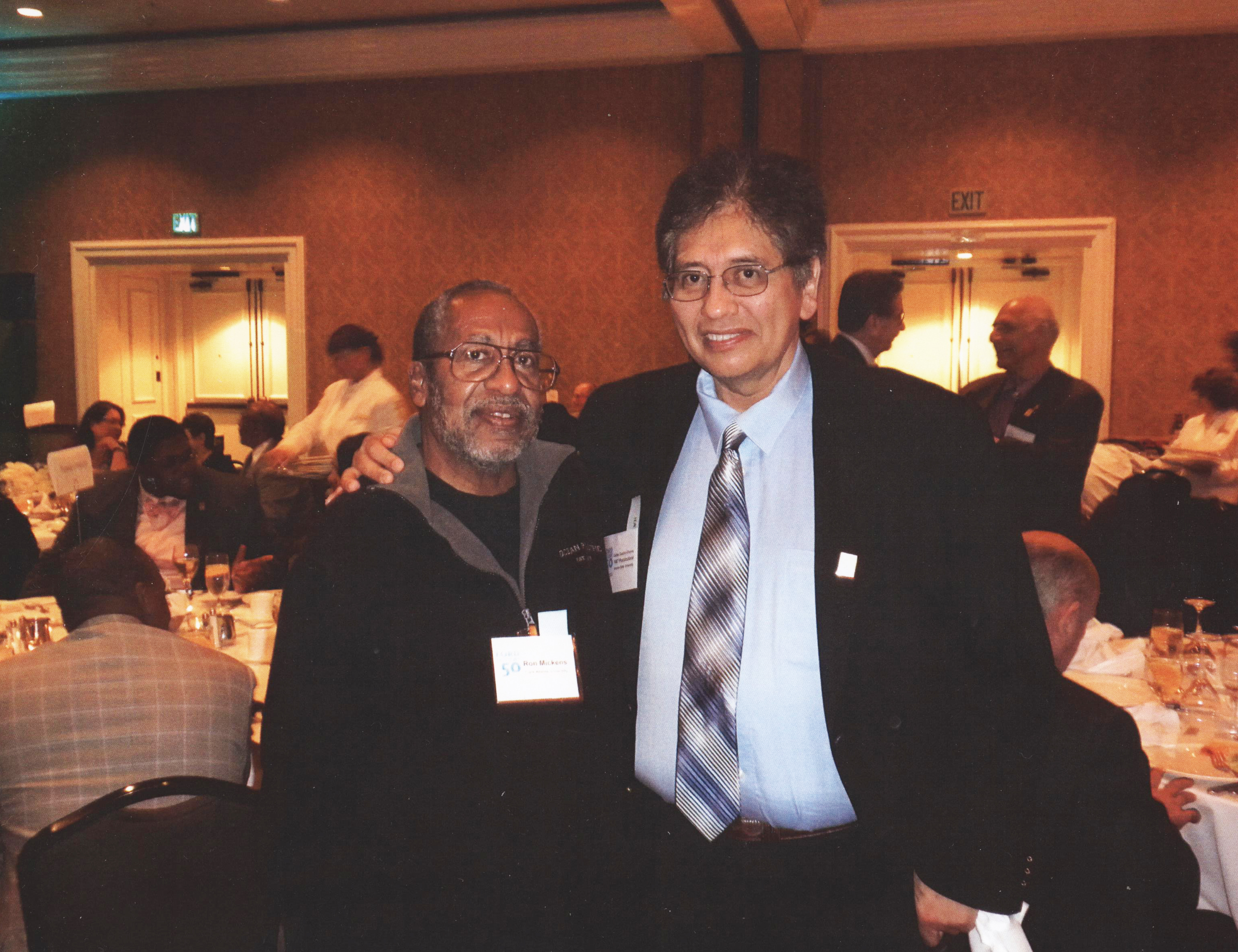
Ronald Mickens and Carlos Castillo-Chavez

Mickens is African-American and has had an interest in the history of science, and specifically the history of black scientists, throughout his academic career. He has served as the historian of the National Society of Black Physicists and has published histories of black physicists – most notably Edward Bouchet, widely recognized as the first African-American to receive a Ph.D. in the United States – as well as biographies of black women in science. Mickens was also a co-founder of the National Conference of Black Physics Students and he was a member of the founding council of the Edward Bouchet Abdus Salam Institute, an organization founded in 1988 by Nobel laureate in physics Abdus Salam to encourage collaboration between African and American physicists, where he continues to serve as a council member. Mickens' work earned him recognition by Mathematically Gifted & Black as a Black History Month 2017 Honoree.

Mickens' papers are held by the Amistad Research Center at Tulane University.

== Awards and honors ==
- Fellow of the American Physical Society
- Mathematically Gifted & Black Honoree, Black History Month 2017
