= Journal of Biological Dynamics =

Peer-reviewed journal

- Discipline: Mathematical biology
- Language: English
- Edited by: J. M. Cushing; Saber N. Elaydi

Publication details
- History: 2007–present
- Publisher: Taylor & Francis
- Frequency: Continuous
- Open access: Yes
- Impact factor: 2.7 (2025)

Standard abbreviations
- ISO 4: J. Biol. Dyn.

Indexing
- ISSN: 1751-3758 (print); 1751-3766 (web)
- OCLC no.: 141192692

Links
- Journal homepage; Online access; Online archive

The Journal of Biological Dynamics is a peer-reviewed open access scientific journal covering mathematical modeling in the field of biology. It was established in 2007 and is published continuously by Taylor & Francis. The editors-in-chief are J. M. Cushing (University of Arizona) and Saber N. Elaydi (Trinity University). According to the Journal Citation Reports, the journal has a 2025 impact factor of 27.
