= Pneumonia of unknown etiology (PUE) surveillance system =

Chinese disease monitoring system

- Traditional Chinese: 不明原因肺炎監測系統
- Simplified Chinese: 不明原因肺炎监测系统
Transcriptions
Standard Mandarin
- Hanyu Pinyin: bùmíng yuányīn fèiyán jiāncè xìtǒng

The pneumonia of unknown etiology (PUE) surveillance system is a Chinese monitoring system, established in response to the 2002–2004 SARS outbreak to track emerging respiratory infections, including avian flu and SARS. On 29 December 2019, local hospitals in Wuhan, Hubei Province, China, identified four closely related people, linked to a local wet market, as having a “pneumonia of unknown etiology” using the national system. Their illness was later confirmed as COVID-19 due to SARS-CoV-2.
