= James Mickens =

American computer scientist

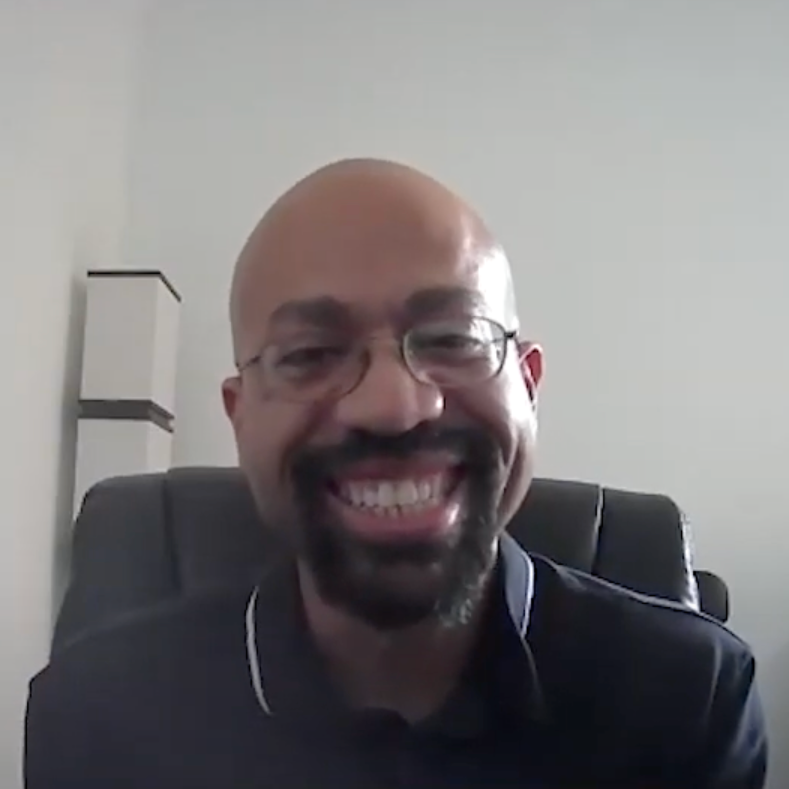
- Mickens in 2020
- Board member of: Berkman Klein Center for Internet & Society

Academic background
- Education: Georgia Institute of Technology (B.S.); University of Michigan (Ph.D.)

Academic work
- Discipline: Computer science
- Sub-discipline: Cybersecurity, distributed computing
- Institutions: Harvard John A. Paulson School of Engineering and Applied Sciences

James W. Mickens is an American computer scientist and the Gordon McKay Professor of Computer Science at Harvard John A. Paulson School of Engineering and Applied Sciences at Harvard University. His research focuses on distributed systems, such as large-scale services and ways to make them more secure. He is critical of machine learning as a boilerplate solution to most outstanding computational problems.

== Early life and education ==
James Mickens was raised in Atlanta. His father is physicist and mathematician Ronald E. Mickens.

Mickens earned a Bachelor of Science in computer science from the Georgia Institute of Technology in 2001, as well as a Ph.D. in computer science from the University of Michigan in 2008.

== Career ==
Mickens worked as a member of the Distributed Systems group at Microsoft Research from 2009 through 2015. He spent one semester at the Massachusetts Institute of Technology (MIT) through the MLK Visiting Professors program becoming a professor at the Harvard John A. Paulson School of Engineering and Applied Sciences in 2015, where he was awarded tenure in 2019. In 2016, he was one of the researchers working on Polaris, a new system designed at MIT to decrease the loading time for webpages.

In 2020, Mickens was appointed to the board of directors of the Berkman Klein Center for Internet & Society at Harvard University. In 2021, he and Jonathan Zittrain began the Institute for Rebooting Social Media, a three-year-long BKC project to research and create new ideas to improve social media.

== Publications ==
- Mickens, James W.; Noble, Brian D. (May 2006). "Exploiting Availability Prediction in Distributed Systems". NSDI'06: Proceedings of the 3rd Conference on Networked Systems Design & Implementation. 3. EECS Department, University of Michigan. Berkeley, California: USENIX Association: 73–86 – via ACM Digital Library, Association for Computing Machinery.
- Netravali, Ravi; Goyal, Ameesh; Mickens, James; Balakrishnan, Hari (March 2016). "Polaris: Faster Page Loads Using Fine-grained Dependency Tracking". NSDI'16: Proceedings of the 13th Usenix Conference on Networked Systems Design and Implementation. Berkeley, California: USENIX Association: 123–136. ISBN 978-1-931971-29-4 – via ACM Digital Library, Association for Computing Machinery.
