= Gerardo Chowell =

American mathematical epidemiologist

- Born: Colima, Mexico
- Other name: Gerardo Chowell-Puente
- Education: University of Colima; Cornell University
- Known for: Mathematical epidemiology
- Scientific career
- Fields: Biostatistics; epidemiology; Public health
- Institutions: Arizona State University; Georgia State University
- Thesis: Mathematical models of emergent and re-emergent infectious diseases: Assessing the effects of public health interventions on disease spread (2005)
- Doctoral advisor: Carlos Castillo-Chavez

Gerardo Chowell is professor of mathematical epidemiology and works at the Department of Population Health Sciences in the School of Public Health at Georgia State University. He grew up in Colima, Mexico, where he became interested in mathematics as a child. He graduated from the University of Colima in 2001 before beginning the summer program at Cornell University's Mathematical and Theoretical Biology Institute. He later decided to enroll in the Ph.D. program at Cornell, which he completed in 2005 under the supervision of Carlos Castillo-Chavez.
