= China Business Journal =

- Founded: January 5, 1985
- Headquarters: Beijing
- Website: cb.com.cn

China Business Journal
- Simplified Chinese: 中国经营报
- Traditional Chinese: 中國經營報
Transcriptions
Standard Mandarin
- Hanyu Pinyin: Zhōngguó jīngyíng bào

The China Business Journal (abbreviated as CBJ; 中国经营报; 中國經營報), or China Business, is a Beijing-based nationally distributed Chinese economic newspaper launched on January 5, 1985. The newspaper is supervised by the Chinese Academy of Social Sciences and organized by the Institute of Industrial Economics of Chinese Academy of Social Science.

== History ==
When the newspaper was introduced, it was called Business Journal of Specialized Households. In August 1986, it was renamed China Rural Business Journal. In 1989, it was renamed China Business Journal.
