= List of fellows of the Royal Society elected in 2026 =

This article lists fellows of the Royal Society who were elected in 2026.

== Fellows ==
1. Manindra Agrawal
2. Dwight Barkley
3. Facundo D. Batista
4. Jean-Pierre Bourguignon
5. Chris Bowler
6. Francis Brown
7. Stuart Butchart
8. Frank Calegari
9. Xiaofeng Cao
10. David Catling
11. Garnet Chan
12. Mark Chaplain
13. Qingyan Chen
14. Simon Cherry
15. Lars Chittka
16. Timothy Coulson
17. Yang Dan
18. Anuj Dawar
19. Charlotte Deane
20. Inderjeet Dokal
21. Michael Elowitz
22. Joseph Felsenstein
23. Elizabeth Fisher
24. Stephen Forrest
25. Jeff Forshaw
26. Piers Forster
27. Simon Foster
28. Hayley Fowler
29. Beverley Glover
30. Leslie Ann Goldberg
31. Ramin Golestanian
32. Nicholas Graham
33. Glenda Gray
34. Luis Herrera-Estrella
35. Masud Husain
36. David Jackson
37. Jan-Theodoor Janssen
38. Segenet Kelemu
39. Srinivasan Keshav
40. Young-Kee Kim
41. Colin Kleanthous
42. Robert Klose
43. Bostjan Kobe
44. J. Michael Kosterlitz
45. Jean Langhorne
46. Gilles Laurent
47. Simon Levin
48. Ruth Ley
49. Can Li
50. Douglas Lin
51. Jitendra Malik
52. Walter Marcotti
53. Debora Marks
54. Roberto Mayor
55. Alex McBratney
56. John McCafferty
57. Ashley Moffett
58. Robert Morris
59. Tom Mrsic-Flogel
60. Alberto Naveira Garabato
61. Chris Parkes
62. Uta Paszkowski
63. David Rees
64. Jonathan Reid
65. Paul Riley
66. Barbara Romanowicz
67. John Rubinstein
68. Malcolm Sambridge
69. Gordon Sanghera
70. Bernhard Schölkopf
71. Melina Schuh
72. Brenda Schulman
73. Zhi-Xun Shen
74. Andrew Shields
75. Malcolm C. Smith
76. Sami Solanki
77. Guy L. Steele Jr.
78. Hiroaki Suga
79. Soumya Swaminathan
80. Elly Tanaka
81. F. Dean Toste
82. Neil Turok
83. Raquel Urtasun
84. Michael Way
85. Stuart West
86. Katherine Willis
87. Teresa Woodruff
88. Michael Wooldridge
89. Clifford J. Woolf
90. Xu Xing
91. Jin-Quan Yu
92. Kun Zhou
93. Peter Zoller

== Honorary Fellows ==
1. Anne Rafferty
