= Zeqiri =

Zeqiri is an Albanian surname. Notable people with the surname include:

- Altin Zeqiri (born 2000), footballer
- Andi Zeqiri (born 1999), Swiss-Albanian footballer
- Bajram Zeqiri (born 1957), British ultrasonic metrology scientist
- Blerta Zeqiri (born 1979), Kosovar director
- Dafina Zeqiri (born 1989), Kosovar-Albanian singer-songwriter
- Dafina Zeqiri (composer) (born 1984), Kosovar composer
- Eda Zeqiri (born 2004), Kosovan swimmer
- Hair Zeqiri (born 1988), Albanian footballer
- Jetmir Zeqiri (born 1996), Macedonian-Kosovan basketball player
- Lejson Zeqiri (born 2001), Macedonian-Kosovan basketball player
- Linda Zeqiri (born 1987), Bulgarian badminton player
- Rita Zeqiri (born 1995), Kosovar swimmer
