= Jerome Goldstein =

American mathematician

Jerome Arthur Goldstein
- Born: August 5, 1941 (age 85); Pittsburgh, Pennsylvania
- Education: Carnegie Mellon University
- Scientific career
- Fields: mathematician
- Workplaces: University of Memphis
- Doctoral advisor: Malempati M. Rao
- Doctoral students: Gisèle Ruiz Goldstein; Denise Kirschner

Jerome (Jerry) Arthur Goldstein (born August 5, 1941 in Pittsburgh, Pennsylvania) is an American mathematician whose main interests are partial differential equations, operator theory, stochastic analysis, fluid dynamics, quantum theory, and mathematical finance.

== Career ==
Goldstein earned his B.S, M.S. and Ph.D. degrees at Carnegie Mellon University in 1963, 1964 and 1967. His Ph.D. thesis Stochastic Differential Equations and Nonlinear Semigroups was supervised by Malempati M. Rao.

He held appointments as Professor of Mathematics at Tulane University (1968–91), and Louisiana State University (1991–96). Since 1996 he is Professor of Mathematical Sciences at the University of Memphis.

In addition, he has held visiting positions at universities in Austria, Brazil, England, France, Germany, Italy, Scotland and the United States.

== Work ==
Jerry's papers and his book on operator semigroups include fundamental contributions to his research areas. His list of publications presently includes more than 250 items.

He is editor of more than 10 journals, including Semigroup Forum, Differential and Integral Equations, Advances in Differential Equations, Positivity, Journal of Evolution Equations, and Mathematische Nachrichten.

Jerome Goldstein has advised 29 PhD-students and has 78 coauthors.

== Awards ==
In 2006 Goldstein received Willard R. Sparks Eminent Faculty Award from the University of Memphis, and in 2002 he was the recipient of the Distinguished Research Award from the University of Memphis. In 2004-2007 he held the Dunavant Professorship at the University of Memphis. During his years at Tulane University, Goldstein received the first Faculty Award for Excellence in Research (1985) given by Tulane University.

In 2013 he became a fellow of the American Mathematical Society, for "contributions to partial differential equations and its applications, and to the dissemination of mathematics to a wider public".
