= Gisèle Ruiz Goldstein =

American mathematician

- Born: August 24, 1958 (age 68); New Orleans, Louisiana
- Education: Tulane University
- Scientific career
- Fields: mathematician
- Workplaces: University of Memphis
- Doctoral advisor: Jerome Goldstein

Gisèle Ruiz Goldstein is an American mathematician known for her research in partial differential equations, operator theory, and applications of mathematics to physics and finance. Goldstein has won multiple awards; in particular, one of her papers was given the Editors' Choice Award from the editors of Mathematische Nachrichten in 2010, and she was the University of Memphis Faudree Chair from 2011-2014. In December 2020, Discrete and Dynamical Systems - Series S created a special issue in honor of Goldstein's 60th birthday.

== Education ==
Goldstein received her PhD from Tulane University in 1986. Her doctoral advisor was Jerome Goldstein, and the title of her dissertation was Mathematical Contributions to Thomas-Fermi Theory.
