= James Joule Medal and Prize =

Academic award

- Awarded for: Applied Physics
- Sponsored by: Institute of Physics
- Rewards: Silver medal, £1000
- First award: 2008
- Website: https://www.iop.org/about/awards/silver-subject-medals

The James Joule Medal and Prize is awarded by the Institute of Physics. It was established in 2008, and was named in honour of James Prescott Joule, British physicist and brewer. The award is made for distinguished contributions to applied physics. The medal is silver and is accompanied by a prize of £1000.

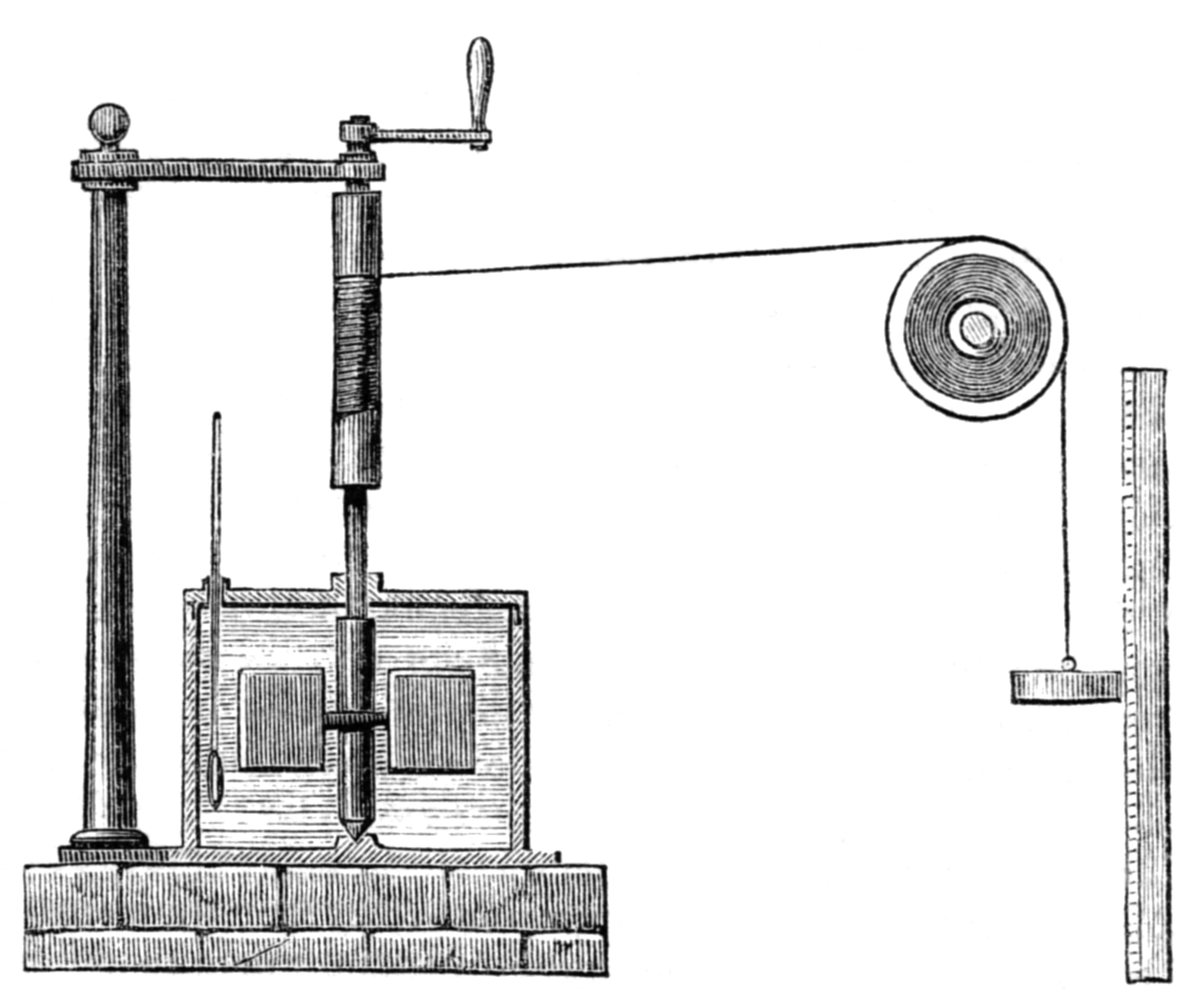
Joule's apparatus for measuring the mechanical equivalent of heat

The medal gained international recognition in 2018 when it was awarded to Sri Lankan scientist Ravi Silva of University of Surrey, whose work in part led to the establishment of the Sri Lanka Institute of Nanotechnology (SLINTec).

== Recipients ==
The following persons have received this medal:

- 2026 Akshay Rao, for pioneering contributions to the physics of energy materials, specifically developing ultrafast optical methods to resolve exciton dynamics in photovoltaics and operando ion transport in batteries to drive sustainable innovation.
- 2024 Carole Tucker, for outstanding work on the development and provision to the worldwide scientific community of metamaterial-based quasi-optical components for far infrared to millimetre wavelength astronomical instruments and other applications.
- 2023 Jan-Theodoor Janssen, for outstanding contributions to fundamental and practical quantum electrical metrology.
- 2022 Michael Holynski, for distinguished contributions to the development of quantum sensors
- 2021 Bajram Zeqiri, for development of acoustic measurement techniques and sensors
- 2020 Richard Bowtell, for new hardware and techniques for biomedical imaging
- 2019 Robert Hadfield, for infrared single photon detection technology
- 2018 Ravi Silva, for carbon nanomaterials
- 2017 Henry Snaith, for metal-halide perovskite solar cells
- 2015 Judith Driscoll, for strongly correlated oxides
- 2013 Paul French, for fluorescence-lifetime imaging microscopy
- 2011 Donald D Arnone, for terahertz radiation research
- 2009 Jenny Nelson, for theoretical analysis of photovoltaic materials
- 2008 David Parker, for positron emission particle tracking

== See also ==
- Institute of Physics Awards
- List of physics awards
- List of awards named after people
