= Tanniemola Liverpool =

- Education: University of Cambridge
- Scientific career
- Workplaces: University of Cologne University of Leeds University of Bristol

Tanniemola Liverpool (born 20 April 1971) is a professor of Theoretical Physics at the University of Bristol.

== Early life and education ==
Liverpool was born in London to parents from Sierra Leone. His father, Lennox Liverpool, also has a PhD in Mathematics and taught at the University of Jos. He went to school at the Liverpool Blue Coat School. He studied physics at Trinity Hall, Cambridge, graduating in 1991. He completed his doctoral studies, "A Stochastic Approach to Describing Geological Systems" at the University of Cambridge under the supervision of Sam Edwards in 1995. Whilst at Cambridge he was part of a Group to Encourage Ethnic Minority Applicants.

== Research and career ==
Liverpool studies the role of hydrodynamic interactions in the collective behaviour of particles in a fluid. He observed that swimming bacteria, algae and spermatozoa could be described as "living liquid crystals". By understanding the movement of artificial 'swimmers' in soft matter, he hopes to design new cancer treatments.

After his PhD, Liverpool joined University of Cologne as a postdoctoral researcher. Liverpool was awarded a Royal Society Research Fellowship in 2000. He joined the University of Leeds, working in the Applied Mathematics group.

Liverpool works at the University of Bristol in the Centre for Synthetic Biology. He studies the self-assembly of protein building blocks. He is on the editorial board of the Journal of Theoretical Biology. He is the chair of the Institute of Physics Liquid and Complex Physics group.

He is part of several initiatives to improve diversity within the physics and mathematics communities. He was selected as one of several outstanding scientists to be featured in the book "Science, Not Art: Ten Scientists' Diaries".
