= David Catling =

David C. Catling FRS is a Professor in Earth and Space Sciences at the University of Washington. He is a planetary scientist and astrobiologist whose research focuses on understanding the differences between the evolution of planets, their atmospheres, and their potential for life. He has participated in NASA's Mars exploration program and contributed research to help find life elsewhere in the Solar System and on planets orbiting other stars. He is also known for his work on the evolution of Earth's atmosphere and biosphere. Research includes how Earth's atmosphere became rich in oxygen, allowing complex life to evolve, and conditions conducive to the origin of life,, such as how soda lakes provide an answer to the phosphate problem of the origin of life. Catling was elected a Fellow of the Royal Society in May 2026.

== Biography ==
David Catling completed a D.Phil. in the Department of Atmospheric, Oceanic, and Planetary Physics at the University of Oxford in 1994. After working as a postdoctoral scholar and then research scientist at NASA's Ames Research Center from 1995-2001, he became a professor at the University of Washington in 2001. Since 2012, he has been a full professor at the University of Washington. In 2023, he was elected a fellow of the American Geophysical Union "for creative insights into coupling between Earth's biota and its atmosphere over timescales of billions of years", and in 2026, elected a fellow of the Geochemical Society, for insights that "shine new light on the crucial role of free oxygen in the evolution of life and how the early environment may have sparked the origin of life."

== Research ==
In the area of the evolution of the Earth's atmosphere, Catling is known for a theory explaining how the Earth's crust accumulated large quantities of oxidized minerals and how the atmosphere became rich in oxygen. Geological records show that oxygen flooded the atmosphere in a Great Oxidation Event (GOE) starting about 2.4 billion years ago, even though bacteria that produced oxygen likely evolved hundreds of millions of years earlier. Catling's theory proposes that biological oxygen was initially used by reactions with chemicals in the environment; gradually, however, Earth's environment shifted to a tipping point where oxygen flooded the air. Atmospheric methane is the key part of this theory. Before oxygen was abundant, methane gas could reach concentrations hundreds or thousands of times greater than today's 1.8 parts per million. Ultraviolet light decomposes methane molecules in the upper atmosphere, causing hydrogen gas to escape into space. Over time, the irreversible atmospheric escape of hydrogen– a powerful reducing agent -caused Earth to oxidize and reach the GOE tipping point. Measurements of atmospheric xenon in ancient seawater trapped inside old rocks, published since the 2010s, supports the theory: Earth's atmospheric xenon and its lighter isotopes were most plausibly lost by being dragged out to space by vigorously escaping hydrogen.

Other studies about Earth's atmospheric oxygen have considered its second increase around 600 million years ago acted as a precursor to the rise of animal life. Catling proposed looking at oxygen-sensitive variations in stable isotopes of selenium to trace atmospheric and seawater oxygen, and the results of such a study showed that Earth's second increase in oxygen occurred in fits and starts spread over about 100 million years.

Catling also contributed to the first measurements of Earth's atmospheric thickness billions of years ago. He helped pioneer two techniques: using fossil raindrop imprints to set an upper limit on air density, which was applied to fossil imprints from 2.7 billion years ago, and using fossil bubbles in ancient lava flows, which suggests that air pressure 2.7 billion years ago was less than half that of the modern atmosphere.

Catling has also researched the evolution of the atmosphere and surface of Mars. In the 1990s, he pioneered research on how the types of salts from dried-up lakes or seas on Mars could indicate the past environment and whether Mars was habitable. Since then, the discovery of salts and clays from former lakebeds has been a key success of missions to Mars by NASA and ESA. Catling was on the Science Team for NASA's Phoenix Lander mission, which in 2008 was the first spacecraft to land in the ice-rich high latitudes of Mars. Catling contributed to research that included the first scoops by a lander of water ice from below the surface of Mars and the first measurement of soluble salts in martian soil, including the soil pH. In experimental work with Jonathan Toner to examine low-temperature solutions of perchlorate salts, as found on Mars, Toner and Catling discovered that such solutions super cool and never crystallize. The perchlorates form glasses (amorphous solids) around -120 °C. Glasses are known to be far better for preserving microbes and biological molecules than crystalline salts, which could be relevant to the search for life on Mars, Jupiter's moon Europa, and Saturn's moon Enceladus.

In the field of planetary atmospheres, David Catling and Tyler Robinson proposed a general explanation for a curious observation: the minimum air temperature between the troposphere (the lowest atmospheric layer where temperature declines with altitude) and stratosphere (where temperature increases with altitude in an 'inversion') occurs a pressure of about 0.1 bar on Earth, Titan, Jupiter, Saturn, Uranus, and Neptune. This level is the tropopause. Robinson and Catling used the physics of radiation to explain why the tropopause temperature minimum in these extremely different atmospheres occurs at a common pressure. They propose that pressure around 0.1 bar could be a fairly general rule for planets with stratospheric temperature inversions. This rule could constrain the atmospheric structure of exoplanets and hence their surface temperature and habitability.

Work by Catling and his students is also the first to accurately quantify the thermodynamic disequilibrium in planetary atmospheres of the Solar System, which has been proposed as a means to look for life remotely.

== Works ==
David Catling has authored over 150 scientific articles or book chapters. He is the author of the following books:

- Catling, David C. Astrobiology: A Very Short Introduction, Oxford University Press, Oxford, 2013, ISBN 0-19-958645-4.
- Catling, David C.; Kasting, James F. Atmospheric Evolution on Inhabited and Lifeless Worlds. Cambridge University Press. Cambridge, 2017. ISBN 978-0521844123.
