= Denise Kirschner =

American mathematical biologist

Denise Ellen Kirschner is an American mathematical biologist and immunologist whose research topics include granulomas, HIV, tuberculosis, and the mechanisms by which disease pathogens interact with and persist in their hosts. She is a professor of microbiology and immunology at the University of Michigan, co-editor-in-chief of the Journal of Theoretical Biology, and former president of the Society for Mathematical Biology.

== Education and career ==
Kirschner graduated from Tulane University in 1985, and completed her Ph.D. there in 1991. Her dissertation, Mathematical Modeling of the AIDS Virus in Epidemiology and Immunology, was jointly supervised by Jerome Goldstein and James (Mac) Hyman.

After postdoctoral research at Vanderbilt University, she was an assistant professor at Texas A&M University from 1994 to 1997 before moving to the University of Michigan.

She was president of the Society for Mathematical Biology from 2017 to 2019. She is a speaker of the IBS Biomedical Mathematics Group.

== Recognition ==
Kirschner was listed as one of the inaugural Fellows of the Society for Mathematical Biology, in the class of 2017. She was named a SIAM Fellow in the 2021 class of fellows, "for contributions to modeling pathogen-host interactions and host immune response in infectious diseases and training in mathematical biology/immunology". In 2025, Kirschner was elected a Fellow of the American Academy of Microbiology.
