= Klaus Hulek =

German mathematician (born 1952)

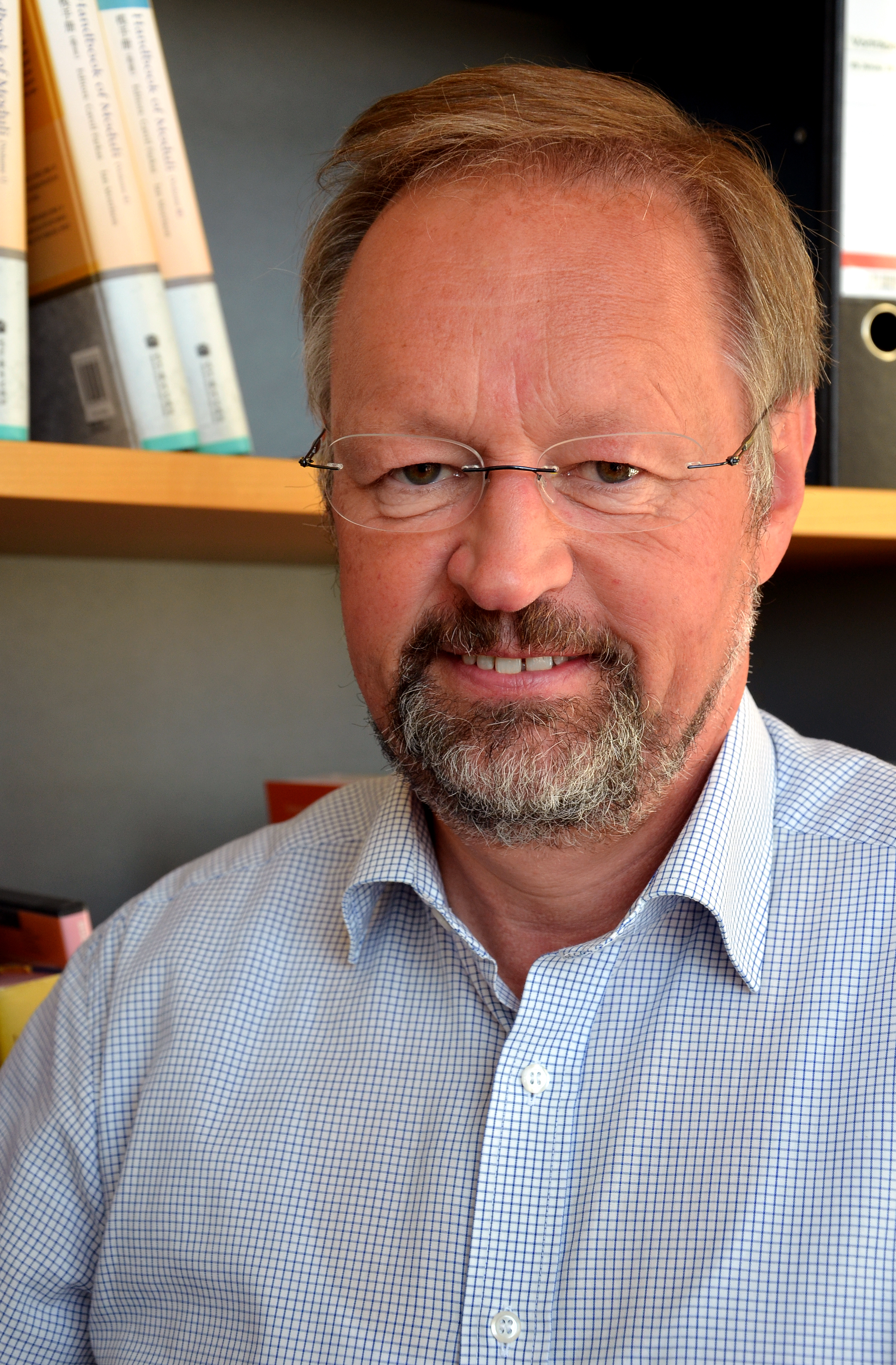
Klaus Hulek in 2013

Klaus Hulek (born 19 August 1952 in Bad Hindelang) is a German mathematician, known for his work in algebraic geometry and in particular on moduli spaces.

== Life ==
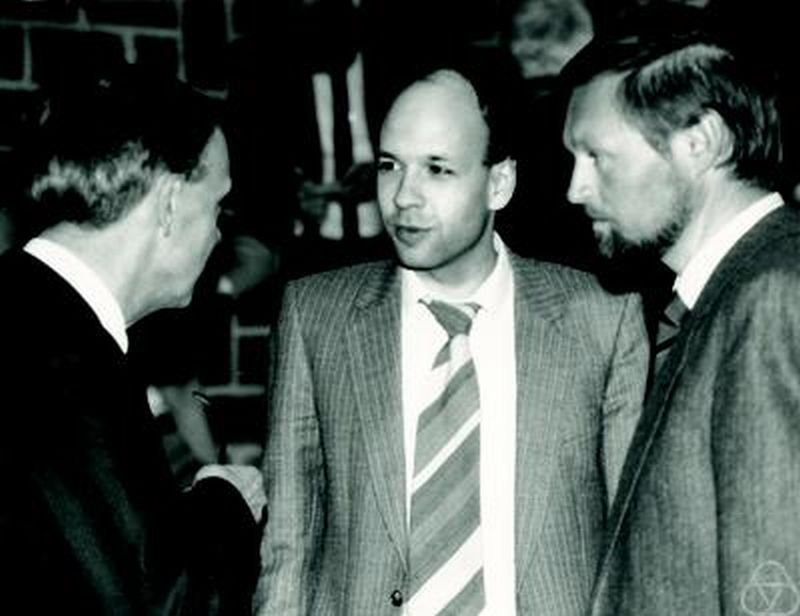
Friedrich Hirzebruch (left), Thomas Peternell (centre), Klaus Hulek (right), Erlangen 1978

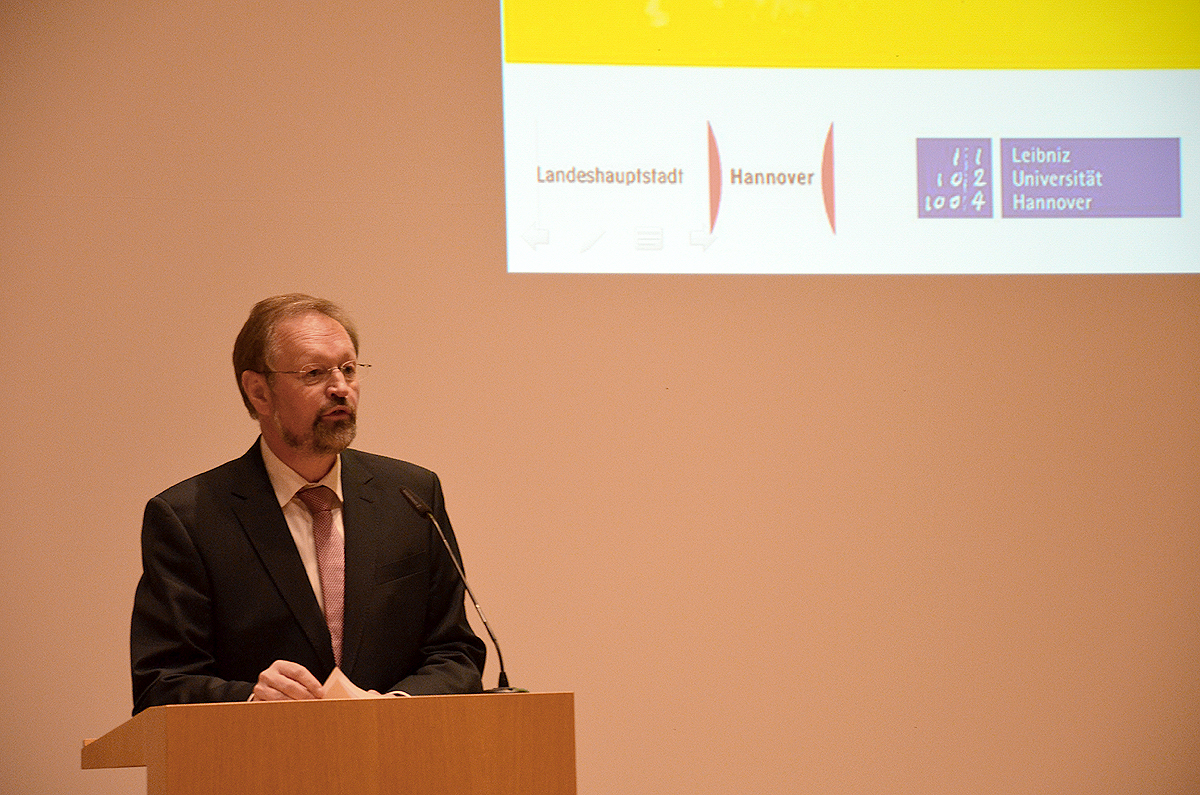
Klaus Hulek (2014) in Herrenhausen Gardens at the opening of the 4th Hannover Festival of Philosophy

Klaus Hulek studied Mathematics from 1971 at LMU Munich graduating in 1976 with his Diplom. In 1974/75 he studied at Brasenose College of the University of Oxford, where he obtained a master's degree.

As a student he was a member of the Stiftung Maximilianeum and of the German Academic Scholarship Foundation.

He obtained his doctorate under the supervision of Wolf Barth at the University of Erlangen–Nuremberg in 1979. His thesis was "Stable rank 2 vector bundles on $\mathbb{P}^2$ with odd first Chern class". In 1982/83, he held a post-doctorate position at Brown University and after that he returned to Erlangen as a research scientist, where he completed his habilitation in 1984, gaining the title Privatdozent.

From 1985, Hulek was a professor at the University of Bayreuth, and in 1990 he moved to Leibniz University Hannover, where he was also vice-president for research from 2005 to January 2015.

In 2015, Hulek was member of the Institute of Advanced Study (IAS) in Princeton, USA. He was vice-president of the German Mathematical Society (DMV) from January 2019 to May 2020.

During his career, Hulek has been a member of numerous boards and committees. From 1991 to 1993 he was a member of the Struktur- und Berufungskommission of Humboldt Universität zu Berlin (HUB) which had been set up to restructure mathematics at HUB after German unification.

From 2007 to 2014, he was the representative of the German Rectors’ Council (HRK) at the Research Policy Working Group at the European University Association and from 2009 to 2014 a member of the Committee on European Research Policy of HRK. From 2016 to 2023, Hulek was a member of the Committee for Developing Countries of the European Mathematical Society.

Since 2011, Hulek has been a member of the Foundation Board of the Oberwolfach Foundation, which supports the Mathematisches Forschungsinstitut Oberwolfach (MFO). He is currently a member and deputy chair of the University Council of the Hochschule für Musik, Theater und Medien Hannover (Hanover University of Music, Drama and Media, HMTMH) (since 2024), and a member of the Scientific Advisory Board of EMS Press (since 2025). He was editor-in-chief of zbMATH from 2016 to 2023, during which period zbMATH became the open access service zbMATH Open. Hulek was also editor (2005–2012) and editor-in-Chief (2012–2025) of Mathematische Nachrichten.

His students include Andreas Gathmann and Matthias Schütt.

== Research ==
Hulek is a German mathematician, specializing in algebraic geometry, with a particular focus on moduli spaces. He originally worked on vector bundles, moving on to moduli spaces of abelian varieties, Enriques surfaces and K3 surfaces. His work contributed to the understanding of the geometry and topology of moduli spaces and their compactifications.

His earlier results include his work with Barth on monads and moduli of vector bundles and on the Horrocks-Mumford bundle. Together with V. Gritsenko and G. K. Sankaran they proved that all but finitely many moduli spaces of polarized K3 surfaces are of general type.

Hulek has also obtained results on moduli of hyperkähler manifolds and, more recently, on moduli of cubic hypersurfaces, ball quotients and Deligne-Mostow varieties. These results shed light on the interplay between Hodge theory and GIT moduli spaces. His work on the arithmetic of Calabi-Yau varieties, partly with H. Verrill, contributed to number theory and was also taken up in string theory.

== Selected publications ==
- Barth, Wolf; Hulek, Klaus (December 1978). "Monads and moduli of vector bundles". Manuscripta Mathematica. 25 (4): 323–347. doi:10.1007/bf01168047. ISSN 0025-2611.
- Hulek, Klaus (October 1979). "Stable rank-2 vector bundles on ℘2119;_{2} with c^{1} odd". Mathematische Annalen. 242 (3): 241–266. doi:10.1007/bf01420729. ISSN 0025-5831.
- Catanese, Fabrizio; Franciosi, Marco; Hulek, Klaus; Reid, Miles (1999). "Embeddings of curves and surfaces". Nagoya Mathematical Journal. 154: 185–220. arXiv:alg-geom/9607021. doi:10.1017/s0027763000025381. ISSN 0027-7630.
- Barth, Wolf P.; Hulek, Klaus; Peters, Chris A. M.; Van de Ven, Antonius (2004). "Compact Complex Surfaces". Ergebnisse der Mathematik und Ihrer Grenzgebiete. 3. Folge / A Series of Modern Surveys in Mathematics. 4. doi:10.1007/978-3-642-57739-0. ISBN 978-3-540-00832-3. ISSN 0071-1136.
- Hulek, Klaus; Verrill, Helena (2005). "On modularity of rigid and nonrigid Calabi-Yau varieties associated to the Root Lattice A_{4}". Nagoya Mathematical Journal. 179: 103–146. arXiv:math/0304169. doi:10.1017/s0027763000025617. ISSN 0027-7630.
- Eisenbud, David; Green, Mark; Hulek, Klaus; Popescu, Sorin (November 2005). "Restricting linear syzygies: algebra and geometry". Compositio Mathematica. 141 (6): 1460–1478. arXiv:math/0404516. doi:10.1112/s0010437x05001776. ISSN 0010-437X.
- Cynk, S.; Hulek, K. (1 December 2007). "Higher-Dimensional Modular Calabi–Yau Manifolds". Canadian Mathematical Bulletin. 50 (4): 486–503. arXiv:math/0509424. doi:10.4153/cmb-2007-049-9. ISSN 0008-4395.
- Gritsenko, V.A.; Hulek, K.; Sankaran, G.K. (12 May 2007). "The Kodaira dimension of the moduli of K3 surfaces". Inventiones Mathematicae. 169 (3): 519–567. arXiv:math/0607339. Bibcode:2007InMat.169..519G. doi:10.1007/s00222-007-0054-1. ISSN 0020-9910.
- Gritsenko, V.; Hulek, K.; Sankaran, G. K. (26 January 2010). "Moduli spaces of irreducible symplectic manifolds". Compositio Mathematica. 146 (2): 404–434. arXiv:0802.2078. doi:10.1112/s0010437x0900445x. ISSN 0010-437X.
- Grushevsky, Samuel; Hulek, Klaus (24 January 2012). "The class of the locus of intermediate Jacobians of cubic threefolds". Inventiones Mathematicae. 190 (1): 119–168. arXiv:1103.1857. Bibcode:2012InMat.190..119G. doi:10.1007/s00222-012-0377-4. ISSN 0020-9910.
- Casalaina-Martin, Sebastian; Grushevsky, Samuel; Hulek, Klaus; Laza, Radu (17 August 2020). "Complete moduli of cubic threefolds and their intermediate Jacobians". Proceedings of the London Mathematical Society. 122 (2): 259–316. arXiv:1510.08891. doi:10.1112/plms.12375. ISSN 0024-6115.
- Casalaina-Martin, Sebastian; Grushevsky, Samuel; Hulek, Klaus; Laza, Radu (February 2023). "Cohomology of the Moduli Space of Cubic Threefolds and Its Smooth Models". Memoirs of the American Mathematical Society. 282 (1395). arXiv:1904.08728. doi:10.1090/memo/1395. ISSN 0065-9266.
