= Ravi Silva =

Sri Lankan-British professor

Ravi Silva: CBE; FREng; FInstP; FIET; FRSA; FNASSL; FISC; FEurASc
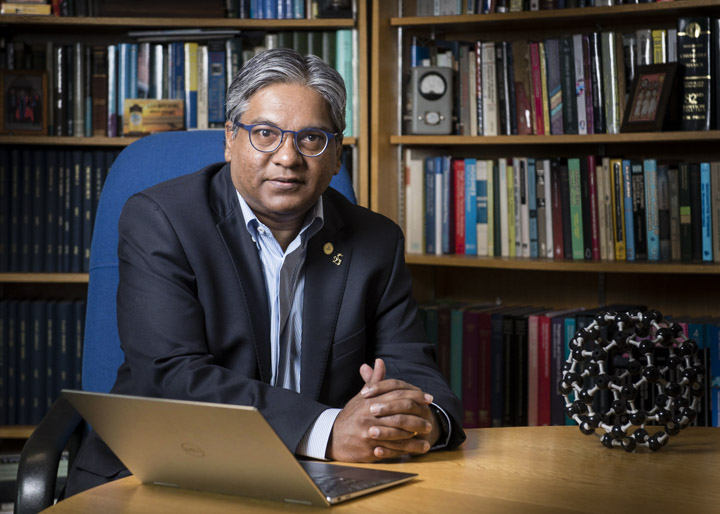
- Ravi Silva at the Advanced Technology Institute, University of Surrey, 2024
- Born: Sembukuttiarachilage Ravi Pradip Silva; May 1969 (age 57)
- Education: University of Cambridge (BA, MA, PhD); D. S. Senanayake College
- Awards: James Joule Medal and Prize; Distinguished Fellow of DFIETI; Academician of CAE; Surrey Distinguished Professor; Platinum Medal (IOM3); J. J. Thomson Medal (IET); Clifford Patterson Award (RS); Javed Husain Young Scientist Award
- Scientific career
- Fields: Nanotechnology; Large-area electronics; Carbon nanotube; Perovskite solar cell; Organic solar cell
- Workplaces: University of Surrey
- Thesis: Electronic, optical and structural properties of semiconducting diamond-like carbon thin films (1994)
- Website: www.surrey.ac.uk/people/s-ravi-p-silva

Sembukuttiarachilage Ravi Pradip Silva (born May 1969), commonly known as S. Ravi P. Silva or Ravi Silva, is a Sri Lankan-British professor and the Director of the Advanced Technology Institute (ATI) at the University of Surrey. He also heads the Nano-Electronics Centre (NEC), an interdisciplinary research activity. His research interests include nanotechnology, large-area electronics, and Perovskite and organic solar cell. He is also the Founder and the Chief Scientific Officer for Silveray.

Silva was made a Commander of the Order of the British Empire (CBE) in 2021 for "services to Science, to Education and to Research", and he also received the James Joule Medal and Prize and IOM3's Platinum Medal, among other awards.

== Early life and education ==
Sembukuttiarachilage Ravi Pradip Silva was born in Sri Lanka in May 1969. Silva received his secondary education at D. S. Senanayake College in Colombo, Sri Lanka. He then completed at the University of Cambridge a Bachelor of Art (BA) in 1990 in Electrical and Information Sciences, and Masters of Art (MA) in Electrical and Electronics Engineering in 1991, followed by a Doctor of Philosophy between 1991 and 1994.

He was the recipient of the Cambridge Commonwealth Trust Fellowship at Clare College, Cambridge.

== Career ==
=== Academia ===
Silva joined the University of Surrey in 1995. He has been the Director of the Advanced Technology Institute (ATI) and the head of the Nano-Electronics Centre since then. The ATI has grown into a world-leading research centre, focusing on quantum information and nanoelectronics. Surrey NanoSystems, established as an independent entity from the ATI in 2006, played a key role in the development of the Vantablack, recognised as the darkest structure in the world.

Silva has been an established member of the University of Surrey's Sustainability Executive Committee. He has been spearheading the institution's drive towards Carbon Net Zero, including setting up a Surrey Solar Farm.

Silva is the Editor in Chief of Energy and Environmental Materials, and an Editorial board member at the Scientific Reports.

Silva has also been an external examiner for the University of Cambridge Engineering Tripos.

=== Industry ===
Silva is the Founder and the Chief Scientific Office for Silveray. He is also leading a research project focused on the implementation of solar photovoltaic technology in both the UK and India.

Silva has served as the principal investigator for a pair of Innovate UK grants aimed at Innovation for Industry (I4I), specifically regarding X-ray detector technology. Additionally, he has contributed to a project funded by the National Institute for Health Research (NIHR) focusing on innovation, working alongside the National Physical Laboratory and Royal Surrey County Hospital to advance radiology measurement methods for medical use.

Silva served on the advisory boards of Imprimatur Ltd and the Sri Lankan National Nanotechnology Initiative (NNI). In 2008, he was appointed as an advisor to the Sri Lankan Minister of Science and Technology, contributing his expertise to the Sri Lanka Institute of Nanotechnology (SLINTec) as well as the Nano-Science Park and Centre, NANCO Pvt Ltd. Silva persuaded five private companies to consider investing in the Sri Lanka Institute of Nanotechnology.

== Research ==
Silva's research on nanotechnology, large-area electronics, carbon nanotubes, perovskite solar cell, and organic solar cell has resulted in over 680 presentations at international conferences and over 650 journal papers. As of March 2023, he has over 29,000 citations with an H-index of 87. He has 25 patents, including key patents on low-temperature growth of carbon nanotubes, fabrication of high-performance large area X-ray detectors, and fabrication of large area nanotube-organic solar cells.

== Awards and honours ==
Silva has received numerous awards and honours for his contributions to science, education, and research. He was made a Commander of the Order of the British Empire (CBE) in the 2021 Queen's New Year Honours' list for "services to Science, to Education and to Research". In 2016, he received a Government of Sri Lanka Presidential Award in recognition of his many contributions in the field of nanotechnology. He has also received the James Joule Medal and Prize from the Institute of Physics (IOP) in 2018 for his contributions to Applied and Environment Sciences.

Silva was honoured as the Surrey Distinguished Professor at the University of Surrey in 2019. In 2015, the Institute of Materials, Minerals, and Mining (IOM3) awarded him the Platinum Medal. His contributions were recognised in 2014 by the Institution of Engineering and Technology (IET), which awarded him the J J Thomson Medal. In 2011, the Royal Society acknowledged his outstanding contribution in the fields of Carbon Nanoscience and Nanotechnology with the Clifford Patterson Medal and Lecture.

In 2007, Silva was the runner-up for the Times Higher Education Young Scientist of the Year and Most Entrepreneurial Scientist in the United Kingdom by UKSEC and Science Alliance of the Netherlands. In 2003, he won the Javed Husain Young Scientist Award from the UNESCO. He was also recognised by the Institute of Electrical Engineers with the IEE Achievement Award. In 2005, he was a finalist for Emerging Technologies at the IEE Awards for his work at the Nano Electronics Centre for Innovation in Engineering.

Silva has been elected a Fellow of the Institution of Engineering and Technology (FIET), Fellow of the Institute of Physics (FInstP), Fellow of the Royal Society of Arts (FRSA) in 2007, Fellow of the Royal Academy of Engineering (FREng) in 2008, Fellow of the National Academy of Sciences of Sri Lanka (FNASSL) in 2009, Distinguished Fellow of the International Engineering and Technology Institute (DFIETI) in 2022, Academician of the Chinese Academy of Engineering in 2023, Fellow of the International Science Council (FISC) in 2024, and Fellow of the European Academy of Sciences and Arts (FEurASc) in 2024.

Silva was appointed as a Distinguished Visiting professor at Chonbuk National University in South Korea and Zhengzhou University in China. He is a visiting professor at the Dalian Technology University and Guest Professor at the Wuhan University of Technology. In 2009, he was granted the Royal Society Kan Tong Po Visiting Professorship, which included a public lecture and visiting professorship to the Hong Kong Polytechnic University.
