= Last Chance Lake =

Soda lake in British Columbia

Coordinates: 51°19′40″N 121°38′00″W

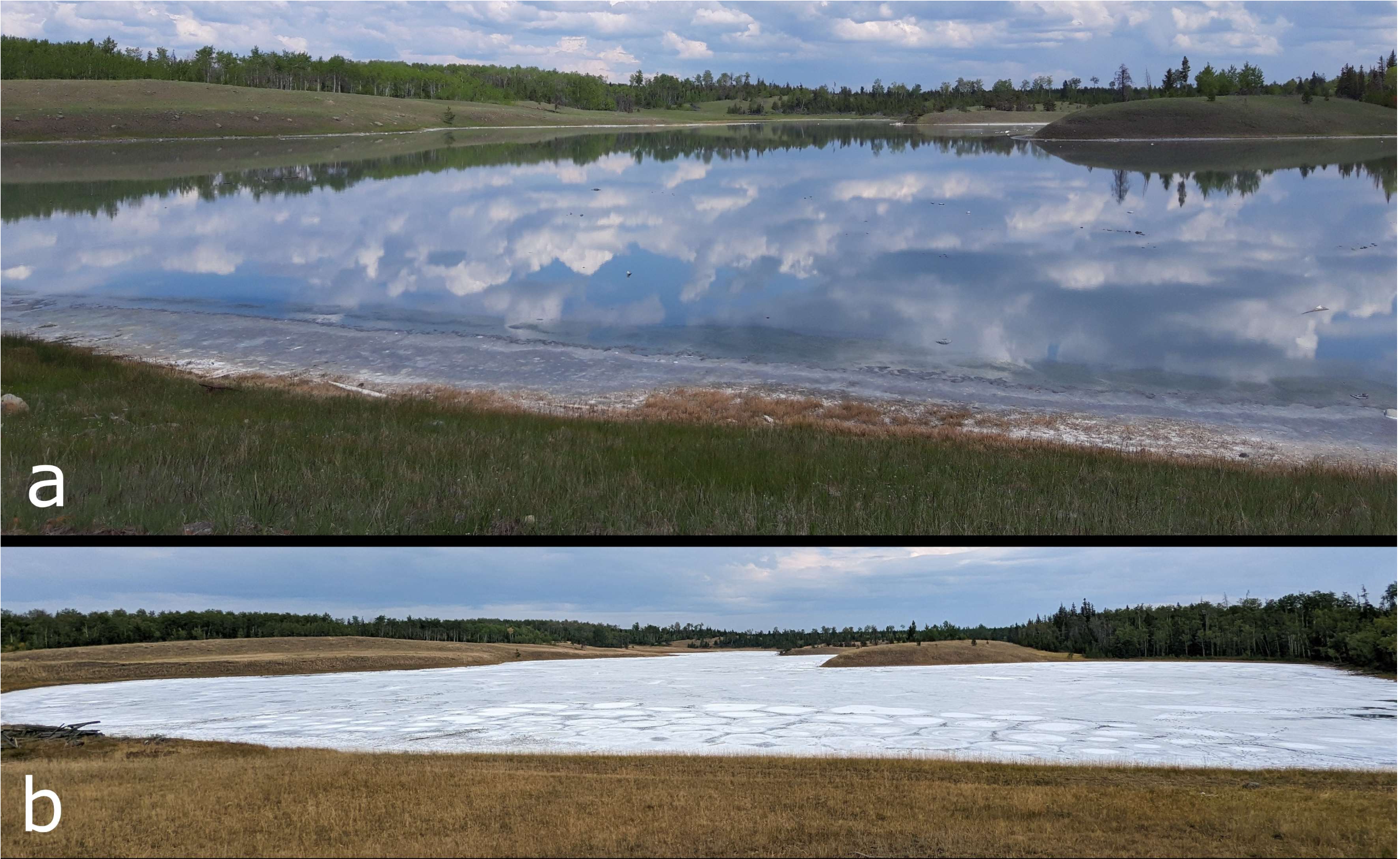
Last Chance Lake in the wet season (a, top) and dry season (b, bottom)

Last Chance Lake is a soda lake in British Columbia, Canada, with the highest naturally occurring concentration of dissolved inorganic phosphate in the world. It is a closed-basin lake, which allows it to maintain high salinity and carbonate alkalinity. In the wet season, it is ~25 cm at its deepest point, while in the dry season, brine pools separated by evaporitic salts form. The lake has garnered attention from scientists who study the origin of life, as it serves as a modern analog for lakes on early Earth and it offers a possible solution to the "phosphate problem of the origin of life": dissolved inorganic phosphate concentrations are low in most natural environments, yet high concentrations are needed for the prebiotic chemistry that led to the origin of life.

== Location, description, and regional geology ==
Last Chance Lake is approximately 120 km (75 mi) northwest of Kamloops, at an altitude of 1,083 m (3,553 ft) above sea level. It covers an area of approximately 130,000 m^{2} (1,400,000 ft^{2}) and has a maximum depth of ~25 cm (~10 in) in late spring. Because it is a closed-basin lake that is fed entirely by groundwater and precipitation, it is highly saline and alkaline, with salinity ranging from ~100 - 450 g/L (~3 - 13 times more saline than the ocean) and a pH around 10. At the end of summer, evaporation leads to the formation of numerous brine pools on the lake and coverings of crusts of salt. The lake develops a thin layer of ice in winter.

Approximately 100 m (330 ft) northwest of Last Chance Lake lies Goodenough Lake, which covers a similar area but is a deeper perennial lake and possesses drastically different chemical and biological characteristics (see Chemistry and Biology).

The lake sits atop 1–5 m of glacial till, under which are the Cariboo Plateau basalts.

== Chemistry and biology ==
Last Chance Lake has the world's highest natural concentrations of dissolved inorganic phosphate of ~37 millimolar. Other ions, including sodium, dissolved inorganic carbon, chloride, magnesium, sulfate, and potassium, are abundant. However, the concentrations of calcium, iron, and dissolved inorganic nitrogen are notably low. Evaporites are mainly composed of natron (Na_{2}CO_{3}•10H_{2}O) but also include other sodium-bearing minerals such as trona, burkeite, nahcolite, thenardite, and halite. Nearby Goodenough Lake has significantly lower phosphate levels, ~0.1 millimolar in late summer.

In the wet season, thin green photosynthetic mats grow on the edges of the lake, but nitrogen fixing microbes are not abundant, likely due to the high salinity. The low rate of nitrogen fixation makes the lake's biological productivity nitrogen-limited. By contrast, Goodenough Lake has thicker (~10 cm, ~4 in), year-round microbial mats on the lake floor.

== Significance for the origin of life ==
The "phosphate problem of the origin of life" refers to the paradox in which high concentrations of dissolved phosphate appear to be necessary for the prebiotic synthesis of molecules during the origin of life, but nearly all modern natural environments have low phosphate levels.

It is thought that the origin of life occurred in a phosphate-rich environment for two main reasons. First, phosphate is present in a diverse range of molecules used by all modern biology, most notably DNA and RNA, phospholipids, and ATP. The ubiquity of phosphate as a stoichiometric component of biomolecules has led scientists to favor a phosphate-rich environment for life's beginnings. Second, high levels of phosphate are favored for practical purposes: it serves as both a catalyst and pH buffer in many prebiotic synthesis reactions. Laboratory experiments that have successfully synthesized biomolecules in prebiotic environmental conditions have also demonstrated the benefits of high phosphate concentrations. Additionally, in other laboratory experiments, the lake water contains enough divalent cations for nonenzymatic RNA synthesis and ribozyme-catalyzed reactions, but not a level of divalent cations that disrupts encapsulation by fatty acid membranes.

In natural environments on modern Earth, dissolved inorganic phosphate concentrations are often very low. The primary sources of inorganic phosphate are rocks that include phosphate-bearing minerals, such as apatite. However, apatite minerals are relatively insoluble in water, and any dissolved phosphate can readily re-precipitate as apatite by binding to calcium ions. Even in acidic environments, where apatite minerals dissolve more easily, phosphate binds to iron and aluminum.

Last Chance Lake demonstrates how a solution to the prebiotic phosphate problem can occur. The lake's anomalously high phosphate levels have been attributed to a combination of two factors: high concentrations of carbonate and a limited biological phosphate sink. High amounts of carbonate increase phosphate concentrations indirectly because carbonate ions bind to calcium ions to form gaylussite or calcite, effectively depleting the concentration of calcium in solution, which in turn reduces the precipitation of phosphate as apatite minerals. Yet high carbonate levels are not always sufficient to increase aqueous phosphate levels because there is often a biological phosphate sink; many carbonate-rich lakes also exhibit high primary productivity due to the overall high nutrient levels, and phosphate can be readily removed by biological processes. Unlike many other carbonate-rich lakes, Last Chance Lake has low biological demand for phosphate, which further allows phosphate to accumulate in high concentrations.

While lakes like Last Chance Lake with high carbonate levels and low biological nitrogen fixation are rare on modern Earth, it is thought that they were much more common on early Earth, especially before the origin of life due to the lack of biological phosphate sink. The early Earth had an atmosphere rich in carbon dioxide, which would have led to increased continental weathering. High weathering rates would in turn create phosphate-rich and carbonate-rich (as well as overall nutrient-rich) lakes, which, combined with the lack of a biological phosphate sink, would allow phosphate concentrations to accumulate. In addition, the bedrock beneath Last Chance Lake is basalt, and the earliest land is thought to have been composed of similar volcanic rock. Last Chance Lake is therefore considered a modern analog for lakes on the early Earth, which may have led to the origin of life. Furthermore, Last Chance Lake may help scientists address questions about the possible origin and presence of life on other planets, such as Mars, whose surface is primarily made of basalt and has evidence of ancient lakes.
