= Uta Paszkowski =

German biologist

Uta Paszkowski FRS (born 1964) is a German biologist specializing in molecular genetics of arbuscular mycorrhizal (AM) symbiosis in cereals. Since 2026 she has been Russell R. Geiger Professor of Crop Science and director of the Crop Science Centre at the University of Cambridge.

== Early life and education ==
Paszkowski undertook undergraduate study at the University of Cologne. She earned a Diplom (master's degree) in phytopathology at the Max Planck Institute for Plant Breeding Research. She completed her Doctor of Philosophy (PhD) degree in biotechnology at ETH Zurich. Her research focused on gene targeting in tobacco.

== Academic career and research ==
Following postdoctoral work on AM symbiosis at the University of Basel and the Syngenta Torrey Mesa Research Institute, she held academic positions at the University of Geneva and the University of Lausanne.

She joined the University of Cambridge in October 2012 as a lecturer. She was promoted to reader in 2017. She was made Professor of Plant Molecular Genetics in 2019. She is a fellow of St John's College, Cambridge, where she is director of studies for plant sciences. In 2026, she was additionally appointed Russell R. Geiger Chair in Crop Science in the Department of Plant Sciences, University of Cambridge, and director of the Crop Science Centre.

Her research focuses on improving agricultural sustainability by studying how cereals take up nutrients via symbiotic fungi.

== Honours ==
In 2020, was elected as a member to the European Molecular Biology Organisation.

She was elected to the Leopoldina (2023). In 2025, she was elected an international member of the American National Academy of Sciences. In 2026, she was elected Fellow of the Royal Society (FRS), United Kingdom's national academy of sciences.
