= Jan-Theodoor Janssen =

Dutch physicist (born 1965)

Jan-Theodoor Janssen FREng FRS FInstP FIET
- Born: Theodorus Johannes Bernardus Maria Janssen; 1965 (age 60–61); Netherlands
- Education: University of Nijmegen (1993)
- Awards: James Joule Medal and Prize (2023)
- Scientific career
- Fields: Quantum Physics; Condensed Matter Physics; Solid State Physics
- Workplaces: National Physical Laboratory (1998 – ) University of Bristol
- Thesis: Far-infrared magneto-optics of low-dimensional semiconductor structures and organic conductors (1994)
- Website: www.npl.co.uk/people/jt-janssen

Theodorus Johannes Bernardus Maria Janssen FREng FRS FInstP FIET (born 1965), also known as Jan-Theodoor Janssen or JT Janssen, is the Chief Scientist of the National Physical Laboratory (United Kingdom), Henry Royce Institute's Strategic Advisory Board (SAB) Chair since 2024, and President of the Consultative Committee for Ionizing Radiation (CCRI) since 2023. In 2023, he was awarded the Institute of Physics's James Joule Medal and Prize for "outstanding contributions to fundamental and practical quantum electrical metrology". He was elected a Fellow of the National Physical Laboratory in Quantum Electrical Metrology, Fellow of the Institution of Engineering and Technology (IET), Fellow of the Institute of Physics (IOP), and Fellow of the Royal Academy of Engineering in 2021. He was elected a Fellow of the Royal Society in 2026.

Born in the Netherlands, Janssen obtained a doctor of philosophy from the University of Nijmegen in 1993, before joining the University of Bristol as a research fellow and then moving to NPL in 1998. He is a visiting professor at the Lancaster University.
