= Bajram Zeqiri =

British metrologists (born 1957)

Bajram Zeqiri FREng
- Born: October 1957 (age 68); Salerno, Italy
- Education: University of Kent
- Awards: James Joule Medal and Prize (2021)
- Scientific career
- Fields: Ultrasound
- Workplaces: National Physical Laboratory
- Website: www.npl.co.uk/people/bajram-zeqiri

Bajram Zeqiri (born October 1957) is a British ultrasonic metrology scientist and the Head of Science for Medical and Marine Physics at the National Physical Laboratory (United Kingdom). In 2021, he was awarded the Institute of Physics's James Joule Medal and Prize for "distinguished contributions to the development of acoustic measurement techniques and sensors".

Zeqiri was elected a Fellow of the National Physical Laboratory in Ultrasound Metrology in 2008, and Fellow of the Royal Academy of Engineering in 2021.

Born in Salerno, Italy, Zeqiri obtained a Bachelor of Science in chemical physics in 1979, and a Doctor of Philosophy in solid-state chemistry in 1984, both from the University of Kent. He is a visiting professor at the University College London.
