= Colin Kleanthous =

British microbial biochemist (1958–2026)

Colin Kleanthous (September 1958 – November 2026) was a British microbial biochemist and Emeritus Iveagh Professor of Microbial Biochemistry at the University of Oxford. His research focused on bacteriocins and their interactions with the cell envelope of Gram-negative bacteria.

He was elected a Fellow of the Royal Society in 2026. He was also a fellow of Academy of Medical Sciences.

== Education and career ==
Kleanthous obtained his BSc and PhD from the University of Leicester. He was appointed a lecturer at the University of East Anglia in 1991 and became Professor of Biochemistry at the University of York in 2002. He moved to the University of Oxford in 2012, where he became Iveagh Professor of Microbial Biochemistry.

Kleanthous served as chair of the Biochemical Society from 2011 to 2013 and was elected to the European Molecular Biology Organization in 2018. He was elected a Fellow of the Academy of Medical Sciences in 2022.

In 2023, Kleanthous co-founded Glox Therapeutics with Daniel Walker and James Clark. The company was established as a spin-out from research at the Universities of Oxford and Glasgow and develops engineered bacteriocins as targeted antimicrobials against antibiotic-resistant Gram-negative bacteria.

In November 2023, Glox Therapeutics announced £4.3 million in seed funding led by the Boehringer Ingelheim Venture Fund and Scottish Enterprise.

== Research ==
Kleanthous's early research included studies of colicins, protein toxins produced by bacteria, and the immunity proteins that protect toxin-producing cells. His work examined the specificity of interactions between colicins and their immunity proteins.

His research on bacteriocins has also examined how colicins exploit proteins in the bacterial cell envelope to cross the membranes of Escherichia coli.

In a 2015 study published in Nature, Kleanthous and colleagues reported that outer membrane proteins in E. coli form supramolecular assemblies and that their turnover occurs through the displacement of older proteins toward the cell poles as new proteins are inserted during growth.

== Honours and fellowships ==
- Fellow of the Royal Society of Biology (FRSB)
- Member of the European Molecular Biology Organization (2018)
- Fellow of the Academy of Medical Sciences (2022)
- Fellow of the Royal Society (2026)
