= Carole Tucker =

Astronomer

Professor Carole Tucker FLSW
- Awards: Fellow of the Learned Society of Wales, Member of Institute of Physics, Member of Royal Astronomical Society
- Scientific career
- Institutions: Queen Mary University, London, Cardiff University

Carole Tucker FLSW is a Professor at the School of Physics and Astronomy, Cardiff University. She is a Fellow of the Learned Society of Wales (elected 2018), and a member of the Institute of Physics and the Royal Astronomical Society. Her research focuses on astronomy instrumentation in the fields of far infra-red quasi-optics and spectroscopy. She is a member of the UK EPSRC THz Network, Teranet and a reviewer for the IEEE Transactions on Terahertz Science and Technology.

== Research ==
Tucker's publications reflect a host of world-wide astronomical collaborations, which show how the technological developments of her research group are deployed on virtually all FIR telescopes in the world. In the last 2 years, the publications related to this work have accelerated, in line with the current development/instrument work on the next generation CMB and FIR instruments in Europe and the US.

Full list of published research can be found via ORCID.

== Education and career ==
- 1991 BSc (Hons) Physics with Mathematics 2(i). Reading University
- 1992 EC Diploma, “Qualified Expert in Medical Physics and Radiotherapy”.
- 1992 MSc Medical Radiation Physics. QMUL, University of London. Dissertation title “The design and testing of an organic scintillation dosimeter”.
- 2000 PhD Physics. University of London. Thesis title: “A spectroscopic study of charge transfer processes at organo-metallic interfaces.” This period of study was undertaken on a part-time basis whilst employed as a Research Technician
- 1999 – 2001 PDRA Astrophysics Instrumentation Group, Queen Mary & Westfield College, University of London
- 2001-2005 PDRA Astrophysics Instrumentation Group, Cardiff University.
- 2006-2011 Temporary Lecturer, to Lecturer, then Senior Lecturer at Cardiff University.
- 2013-2018 Deputy Head of School, Director of Learning and Teaching, School of Physics and Astronomy, Cardiff University.
- 2014 Chair, School of Physics and Astronomy, Cardiff University

== Industry ==
Tucker is the academic consultant to the technology spin-out company, QMCI Ltd for commercial supply of filter technology and provision of QA documentation.
