= Mark Chaplain =

British mathematician

Mark A.J. Chaplain FRS FRSE
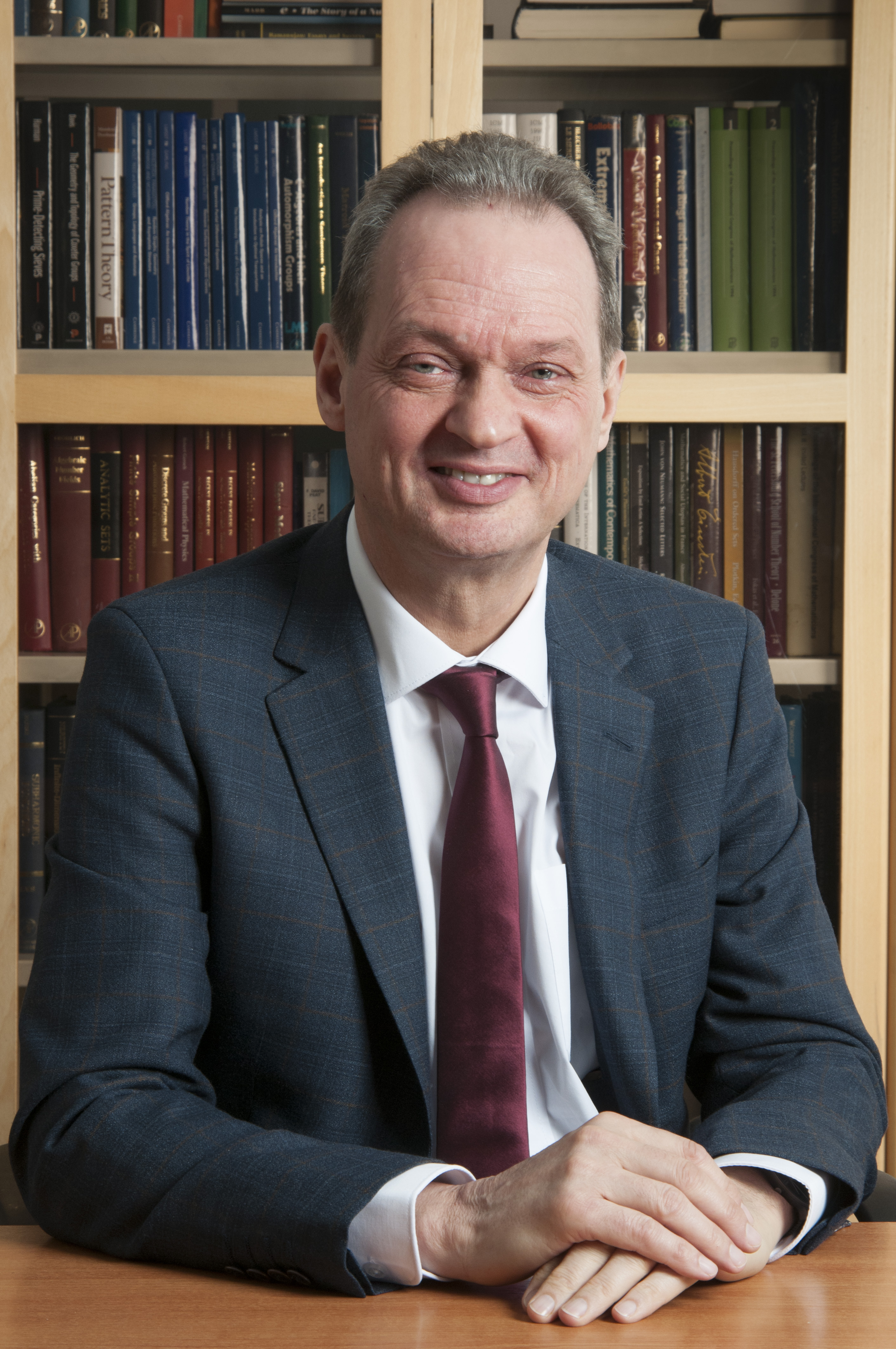
- Born: Mark Andrew Joseph Chaplain; Dundee, Scotland
- Education: University of Dundee (BSc, PhD)
- Awards: Whitehead Prize of LMS (2000); FRSE (2003); Lee Segel Best Paper Prize (2015 and 2023); Member EurASc (2024)
- Scientific career
- Fields: Mathematics; Mathematical biology
- Workplaces: University of St Andrews; University of Dundee; University of Bath
- Thesis: Mathematical Models for the Growth of Solid Tumours and the Tip Morphogenesis in Acetabularia (1990)
- Doctoral advisor: Brian D. Sleeman
- Website: www.st-andrews.ac.uk/mathematics-statistics/people/majc/

Mark Andrew Joseph Chaplain FRS FRSE is a British mathematician and mathematical biologist. Since 2015 he has held the Gregory Chair of Applied Mathematics at the University of St Andrews. He is a Fellow of The Royal Society of Edinburgh (elected in March 2003) and a member of The European Academy of Sciences (elected in 2024).

== Education ==
Chaplain obtained a BSc with 1st-class honours in Applied Mathematics in 1986 from the University of Dundee. In 1990, also at the University of Dundee, he was awarded a PhD for the thesis "Mathematical Models for the Growth of Solid Tumours and the Tip Morphogenesis in Acetabularia" supervised by Brian D. Sleeman.

== Research and career ==
Following his PhD in 1990, Chaplain worked at the University of Bath until 1996. He then held the Ivory Chair of Applied Mathematics at the University of Dundee from 1996 to 2015. Chaplain currently holds the Gregory Chair of Applied Mathematics at the University of St Andrews.

Chaplain's primary area of research focuses on modeling cancer growth, particularly through a systems approach that involves developing quantitative and predictive multiscale mathematical models. This approach, known as "Systems Oncology", has evolved into a distinct field of research.

Since 2012 Chaplain and to date (February 2025) is the co-chief editor of the Journal of Theoretical Biology. He serves on the editorial boards of many other scientific journals.

== Awards and honours ==
Chaplain was elected Fellow of the Royal Society of Edinburgh in 2003 and member of The European Academy of Sciences in 2024. He was also awarded the Whitehead Prize of The London Mathematical Society for research work on the mathematical modelling of cancer growth in 2000. The impact of his work in his and neighbouring research fields, as well as an indication of potential wider societal impact, can be read from the official citation of that award:

Dr M.A.J. Chaplain of Dundee University has developed novel modelling techniques to investigate the key stages of tumour biology resulting in important insights on how different biochemical and mechanical processes interact. His research establishes a framework in which clinical treatments can be tested and has brought him international recognition amongst the mathematical biology community. He and his group have developed this area of research, are at its forefront, and its results could lead to a massive advance in the treatment and control of malignant cancers. The process of angiogenesis is important in many other areas of medicine, for example in tissue repair after wounding, and this work has laid important foundations on which specialists in these other areas can build.

Chaplain has served on the board of the European Society for Mathematical and Theoretical Biology (ESMTB) and of the Society for Mathematical Biology, of which he was president 2005–2007. He was president of the Edinburgh Mathematical Society (EMS) from 2011 to 2013.

Chaplain was awarded the Lee Segel Best Paper Prize in 2015 and in 2023 for the best paper appearing (in the previous two years) in the Bulletin of Mathematical Biology. He was elected a Fellow of the Royal Society in 2026.
