= Crop Science Centre =

Research centre in Cambridge, England

- Location within Cambridgeshire
- Alternative names: 3CS

General information
- Type: Botany Research Centre
- Location: Cambridge, CB3 0LE
- Coordinates: 52.22205408°N 0.096129957°E
- Elevation: 20 m (66 ft)
- Completed: 2015
- Inaugurated: 2015
- Cost: £30m
- Client: University of Cambridge

The Crop Science Centre (informally known as 3CS during its planning) is an alliance between the University of Cambridge and National Institute of Agricultural Botany (NIAB).

== History ==
The Crop Science Centre development plans began in 2015, between the University of Cambridge's Department of Plant Sciences, National Institute of Agricultural Botany and the Sainsbury Laboratory. The research institute received £16.9m funding in 2017 from the UK Research Partnership Investment Fund from Research England (United Kingdom Research and Innovation) to build a new state-of-the-art building, designed exclusively for crop research, which opened on 1 October 2020.

== Structure ==
The Crop Science Centre is based at NIAB's Lawrence Weaver Road HQ site in Cambridge.
