= Journal of Theoretical Biology =

- Discipline: Theoretical biology
- Language: English
- Edited by: Denise Kirschner, Mark Chaplain, Akira Sasaki

Publication details
- History: 1961–present
- Publisher: Elsevier
- Frequency: Biweekly
- Open access: Hybrid
- Impact factor: 2.691 (2020)

Standard abbreviations
- ISO 4: J. Theor. Biol.
- MathSciNet: J. Theoret. Biol.

Indexing
- CODEN: JTBIAP
- ISSN: 0022-5193
- LCCN: 64006601
- OCLC no.: 645600912

Links
- Journal homepage; Online access

The Journal of Theoretical Biology is a biweekly peer-reviewed scientific journal covering theoretical biology, as well as mathematical, computational, and statistical aspects of biology. Some research areas covered by the journal include cell biology, evolutionary biology, population genetics, morphogenesis, and immunology.

The journal was established in 1961. Its founding editor-in-chief was English biologist James F. Danielli, who remained editor until his death in 1984. The journal is published by Elsevier and, as of 2021, the editors-in-chief are Denise Kirschner (University of Michigan Medical School), Mark Chaplain (University of St. Andrews), and Akira Sasaki (The university for advanced studies, SOKENDAI, Hayama). Lewis Wolpert served as editor-in-chief for more than 55 years.

According to the Journal Citation Reports the journal has a 2020 impact factor of 2.691.

== Notable articles ==
The following are the most highly cited articles (more than 2,000 citations at April 2021) that have been published in the journal:

- Hamilton, W.D. (1964). "The genetical evolution of social behaviour. I". Journal of Theoretical Biology. 7 (1): 1–16. Bibcode:1964JThBi...7....1H. doi:10.1016/0022-5193(64)90038-4. PMID 5875341. S2CID 5310280. A classic paper dealing with inclusive fitness.
- Zahavi, Amotz (1975). "Mate selection—A selection for a handicap". Journal of Theoretical Biology. 53 (1): 205–214. Bibcode:1975JThBi..53..205Z. doi:10.1016/0022-5193(75)90111-3. PMID 1195756. Presentation of the handicap principle.
- Pielou, E.C. (1966). "The measurement of diversity in different types of biological collections". Journal of Theoretical Biology. 13: 131–144. Bibcode:1966JThBi..13..131P. doi:10.1016/0022-5193(66)90013-0. Information content of collections of biological species.
- Kauffman, S.A. (1969). "Metabolic stability and epigenesis in randomly constructed genetic nets". Journal of Theoretical Biology. 22 (3): 437–467. Bibcode:1969JThBi..22..437K. doi:10.1016/0022-5193(69)90015-0. PMID 5803332. Forerunner of Kauffman's autocatalytic sets.
- Hamilton, W.D. (1971). "Geometry for the selfish herd". Journal of Theoretical Biology. 31 (2): 295–311. Bibcode:1971JThBi..31..295H. doi:10.1016/0022-5193(71)90189-5. PMID 5104951. An antithesis to the view that gregarious behaviour is evolved through benefits to the population or species.
- Wolpert, L. (1969). "Positional information and the spatial pattern of cellular differentiation". Journal of Theoretical Biology. 25 (1): 1–47. Bibcode:1969JThBi..25....1W. doi:10.1016/S0022-5193(69)80016-0. PMID 4390734. The French flag model of embryogenesis.
