= Phosphate problem of the origin of life =

Unresolved source of phosphorus in prebiotic chemistry

The phosphate problem of the origin of life describes the unresolved source of phosphorus in prebiotic chemistry. Phosphorus is an essential component of universal biomolecules including DNA, RNA, phospholipids, and ATP, and therefore a requisite of biological information storage, compartmentalization, and metabolism. However, the present understanding of the early Earth during the Hadean eon, when biological life is estimated to have emerged, suggests that phosphorus would have been locked into insoluble apatite minerals and unavailable to undergo reactions leading to the synthesis of prebiotic molecules. The phosphate problem represents a critical gap in knowledge regarding the origin of life.

Researchers have attempted to solve the phosphate problem with hypotheses of prebiotic chemistry and geological context that could explain the chemical species of phosphorus or source of phosphate that could have led to the early synthesis of biomolecules. Either phosphorus was available in another form such as phosphite, or there was an environmental mechanism to concentrate bio-available forms of phosphate. Leading hypotheses supported by both environmental observations and laboratory experiments have provided evidence suggesting large closed-basin soda lakes could have concentrated phosphate for theorized prebiotic synthesis mechanisms.

== Progress Solving the Phosphate Problem in the Origin of Life ==
There is no consensus within the scientific community on how early life accessed soluble phosphate or any other phosphorus-containing compound. Research into this subject faces the challenge of lacking substantial environmental evidence from the earliest periods of Earth's history due to plate tectonics, weathering, and other natural phenomena changing and recycling Earth's surface. However, some geological clues, laboratory experiments, and observations of phosphate in our current environment have generated a limited number of hypotheses.

Knowing the geological context is helpful in understanding the predominant phosphate source hypotheses. During the mid- to late-Hadean, Earth's surface, ocean, and atmosphere were significantly different from the environment we observe today. The surface of the Earth would have been covered by a shallow, acidic ocean, with land only beginning to form as volcanic islands with some continental crust. Meteorites bombarded the Earth's surface creating craters and ocean basins. The atmosphere was composed of carbon dioxide, methane, and nitrogen, but lacked oxygen. Without oxygen, the Earth had a reducing atmosphere, not conducive for the persistence of soluble and oxidized phosphate. Even today, phosphorus is rarely found in high concentrations in nature because, in water, it binds to calcium to form insoluble apatite minerals ($\ce{Ca5(PO4)3(OH,F,Cl)}$).

=== Soda Lakes Concentrated Phosphate to Levels Relevant for Prebiotic Chemistry ===
Evidence suggests that carbonate-rich lakes (also referred to as soda lakes) could provide answers to the phosphate problem. In most bodies of water, calcium binds to phosphate to form apatite minerals. This renders the phosphorus inaccessible for prebiotic synthesis. Soda lakes differ in that carbonates bind to calcium in the form of dolomite ($\ce{CaMg(CO3)2}$), removing it from the environment and allowing dissolved phosphate to remain. The highest known naturally occurring dissolved phosphate concentration reaches up to 37 millimolar (mM) in Last Chance Lake. Researchers have used this and other soda lakes as an analog for early Earth environments that could have led to the origin of life.

Extant soda lakes generally form in closed basins (i.e., that lack outflows) and on volcanic bedrock, such as basalt, the weathering of which provides phosphate and carbonates. Streams or springs carry phosphate into lakes and evaporation can concentrate phosphate in the carbonate-rich lake water. Loss of phosphate into relatively insoluble calcium phosphate (or apatite) is small because calcium is precipitated into dolomite instead. A geochemical imbalance of more sources of phosphate than losses allows dissolved phosphate to build up to higher concentrations than in other bodies of water.

It is hypothesized that soda lakes were common on early Earth. A CO_{2}-rich atmosphere would have increased weathering rates, volcanic rocks would have been abundant, and meteorite impacts would have made closed crater basins. Without biology as a phosphate sink before the origin of life, calculations and laboratory experiments suggest sustainable concentrations between 1-100 mM of dissolved phosphate, depending on how efficient phosphorus was recycled back into the system. At such levels, cyanosulfidic prebiotic synthesis of RNA building blocks is plausible.

=== Meteorites Delivered Reduced and Soluble Phosphorus to Earth ===
Meteorites and interplanetary dust particles (IDP) often carry phosphorus to the Earth. During the Late Heavy Bombardment, a period in the Hadean Eon in which the Earth experienced a frequent and severe meteor impacts, it is estimated that 10^{15} - 10^{18} kg of reduced phosphorus was delivered to Earth by meteorites. Upon collision, dust and fragments of the meteorite would have scattered, covering the Earth with a soluble source of phosphorus. While meteorites are composed of several phosphorus-containing minerals, schreibersite ($\ce{(Fe,Ni)3P}$) makes up more than 50% of Fe-meteorites and IDP. Schreibersite is much more soluble than apatite and can dissolve in approximately 10,000 years (quick on geological time scales) to form many oxidation states of phosphorus in water. Most of the dissolved phosphorus is in phosphite, a reduced form of phosphorus. There is evidence that extant microorganisms can use phosphite as a source of phosphorus which may indicate an ancient trait and the ability of Early life to use this reduced form rather than phosphate.

== Early Identification of the Phosphate Problem ==
The early 1950's proved to be an exciting time for biological breakthroughs regarding the origin of life from the discovery of the structure of DNA to the famous Miller-Urey experiment synthesizing amino acids from inorganic molecules. Shortly after these discoveries Addison Gulick, a biochemistry professor at the University of Missouri, published a paper in 1955 titled Phosphorus as a Function in the Origin of Life in which he observed that the existing literature had not yet addressed a source of phosphorus in prebiotic chemistry. Contemporary biology relies on phosphate to provide phosphorus for the structure or DNA, RNA, phospholipids, and ATP, which are used for essential cellular information storage, compartmentalization, and metabolism. Gulick assumed that because these molecules are universal in all known biological life, a dissolved form of phosphorus must have been present during the origin of life.

Gulick's analysis takes into account the atmosphere would have lacked significant oxygen prior to photosynthesis and the Great Oxidation Event. This would have facilitated a reducing atmosphere where more reduced forms of phosphorus would have been available before the most oxidized form, phosphate. Gulick uses meteorites as a proxy for early Earth conditions and observes that phosphorus is often locked into insoluble apatite minerals. The thesis of this paper argues that the phosphorus accessible for prebiotic chemistry would have been in the partially reduced form of phosphite he hypothesized would have been more abundant on early Earth.

== Phosphate's Role in the Origin of Life ==
Given that phosphorus is essential for all known life on Earth it is assumed that last universal common ancestor (LUCA) and even the first universal common ancestor (FUCA) required phosphorus as well. In this section, the key biomolecules that incorporate phosphate into their structure are described to illustrate the significance of phosphorus in biology and likely the origin of life.

=== Phosphate in Key Biomolecules ===
==== DNA ====
Phosphodiester bonds link nucleotides to form DNA.

DNA is composed of nucleotides which contain a phosphate group. These phosphate groups link nucleotides together with phosphodiester bonds providing the backbone of DNA's structure. It is the linking of nucleotides in specific sequences that creates heritable genes carrying information for all molecular processes of life and provides a basis for natural selection.

==== RNA ====
RNA is similar to DNA in that it is composed of phosphate-containing nucleotides linked by phosphodiester bonds. The primary structural difference distinguishing RNA is the hydroxy group (OH) at the 2' position of the ribose base of each nucleotide. RNA can both store genetic information and act as an enzymatic catalyst. RNA is involved in many cellular functions including transcribing DNA for protein synthesis as described by the central dogma of molecular biology.

Of special note, many origin of life researchers have found compelling evidence for the RNA world hypothesis. This hypothesis suggests that RNA came before DNA, acting as both the storage of genetic information and functional catalyst for replication prior to cellular organisms. In the RNA world, polymers of RNA emerged as the first precursors of life, self-replicating without a membrane or metabolism. However, this hypothesis does not provide a source of phosphate for the RNA monomers which contain a phosphate group or for the essential phosphodiester links to make functional strands of RNA.

==== Phospholipids ====
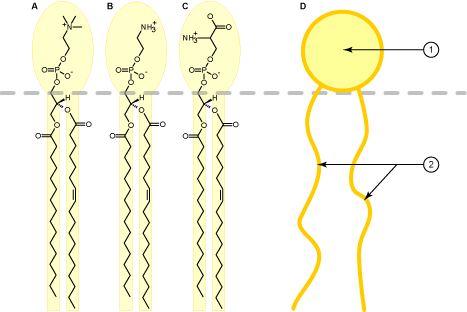
Schematic of phospholipid structure containing phosphate group in the hydrophilic head.

Phospholipids universally compose the membranes of all known cells. By having a membrane the organism is distinct from its environment, allows the cell to concentrate nutrients and other molecules, and provides a degree of protection from outside stressors. This compartmentalization also opens the ability to collectively move all of its functional parts from one location another. Critically, a membrane-bound organism can be acted upon by natural selection; or in other words, evolution could only happen if there were living units to divide and die. It is the phosphate group of the phospholipid that gives it the essential hydrophilic property of the amphiphilic structure. However, researchers believe the earliest cells had more simple lipid membranes rather than phospholipids.

ATP contains a triphosphate group.

==== ATP ====
Adenosine triphosphate (ATP) is universal in all known life as an energy currency within the cell. It contains a triphosphate group which stores the energy needed for biological processes. It is the "fuel" within the cell and required for life. To use this energy, ATP undergoes hydrolysis to remove a phosphate group, converting it to adenosine diphosphate (ADP) and releasing 30.5 kilojoules per mole.

=== Phosphate as a Facilitator of Prebiotic Chemistry ===
In addition to its role as a component of biomolecules, phosphate is thought to have played a non-structural role in facilitating prebiotic synthesis. This is because phosphate can exist in many ionization states across multiple pKa values. By gaining and losing electrons, phosphate can participate in acid-base catalysis and serve as a pH buffer. Phosphate guides reactions pathways by stabilizing molecules, reducing interference by intermediates, and influencing the surrounding chemical environment.
