= Alberto Naveira Garabato =

Spanish oceanographer

Alberto C. Naveira Garabato is a Spanish oceanographer. He has mainly researched the Southern Ocean and Antarctica. He is a fellow of the Royal Society and a honorary fellow of the British Antarctic Survey. Garabato won a Nansen Medal from the European Geosciences Union and a Philip Leverhulme Prize.
