= Facundo D. Batista =

Argentine biologist and researcher

Gabriel Batista
- Education: University of Buenos Aires (BSc); International School of Advanced Studies (PhD)
- Known for: B cell immunology, vaccine development
- Notable work: B cell receptor research, CRISPR-based mouse models for vaccine testing
- Scientific career
- Fields: Immunology, Vaccine Research
- Workplaces: Ragon Institute; Francis Crick Institute; Imperial College London

Facundo Damian Batista is a professor of biology at MIT, the chief editor of the EMBO Journal, and an associate director, scientific director, and principal investigator at the Ragon Institute of Mass General, MIT, and Harvard. An expert in B cells and antibodies, he studies their fundamental biology and their applications to immunology and vaccine development. His research clarified how B cells recognize, extract, and present antigens, influencing ongoing studies in immunology.

== Early life and education ==
Raised in Argentina, Batista developed a passion for molecular biology at the University of Buenos Aires. He earned his Master of Science degree in biology in 1993 and a Ph.D. in biology in 1995 from the International School of Advanced Studies in Trieste.

== Career ==
From 1996 to 2002, Batista trained with Michael Neuberger as an EMBO Postdoctoral Fellow at the MRC Laboratory of Molecular Biology in Cambridge. There, Batista and Neuberger researched the relationship between B cell responses and antigen affinity, publishing their findings in Immunity and Nature.

In 2002, Batista established his research group as a Member of the Francis Crick Institute (formerly the London Research Institute) while holding a Professorship at Imperial College in London. He was granted tenure in 2006.

During this period, he conducted significant research on B cell receptor (BCR) and antigen interactions, publishing influential studies on the mechanisms of antigen recognition and immune response (e.g., Science, 2006; Nature Immunology, 2008). His work also expanded into in vivo studies, where he identified the role of macrophages in antigen transport to B cells (Immunity, 2007), their impact on secondary infection responses (Science, 2015), and their interaction with T cells in innate immunity (Nature Immunology, 2010).

In 2004, Batista's contributions were recognized with the European Molecular Biology Organization (EMBO) Young Investigator Award and the Royal Society Wolfson Research Merit Award in 2009.

Joining the Ragon Institute in 2016, Batista established a research group that studies the mechanisms of B cell activation, which helps support vaccine development. In 2017, Batista helped create a technique for developing human antibodies in the laboratory. The method helps accelerate the process of developing therapeutic antibodies. It also supports vaccine development, allowing researchers to test them in artificial immune systems before clinical trials.

Batista's work at the Ragon Institute developed technical innovations for the genetic engineering of mice with humanized B cell receptors. The resulting animal models enable researchers to test vaccines.^{.} The technique also led to a new HIV vaccine design strategy and could support the development of vaccines against the flu, dengue, malaria and hepatitis C. Batista and the team published their findings from this line of research in The EMBO Journal and Science. Additionally, his research described the role of natural killer T cells in initiating high-affinity antibody production following viral infection (Cell, 2017).

He is a fellow of the British Academy of Medical Sciences since 2013 and the American Academy of Microbiology since 2017, and a member of the Academia de Ciencias de América Latina (ACAL) since 2022. He was elected a Fellow of the Royal Society in 2026.

Also, Batista serves as the Chief Editor of The EMBO Journal and has previously been a member of the editorial boards of major immunology journals, including Science. He is active in public science education, notably through his MIT course on COVID-19, which reached over 300,000 viewers and aimed to counter misinformation about the pandemic.

== Key publications ==
- Antibodies from primary humoral responses modulate the recruitment of naive B cells during secondary responses. Tas, JMJ, Koo, JH, Lin, YC, Xie, Z, Steichen, JM, Jackson, AM, Hauser, BM, Wang, X, Cottrell, CA, Torres, JL et al.. 2022. Immunity 55, 1856–1871.e6. doi: 10.1016/j.immuni.2022.07.020
- Vaccination in a humanized mouse model elicits highly protective PfCSP-targeting anti-malarial antibodies. Kratochvil, S, Shen, CH, Lin, YC, Xu, K, Nair, U, Da Silva Pereira, L, Tripathi, P, Arnold, J, Chuang, GY, Melzi, E et al.. 2021. Immunity 54, 2859–2876.e7. doi: 10.1016/j.immuni.2021.10.017
- Multiplexed CRISPR/CAS9-mediated engineering of pre-clinical mouse models bearing native human B cell receptors. Wang, X, Ray, R, Kratochvil, S, Melzi, E, Lin, YC, Giguere, S, Xu, L, Warner, J, Cheon, D, Liguori, A et al.. 2021. EMBO J 40, e105926. doi: 10.15252/embj.2020105926
- Initiation of Antiviral B Cell Immunity Relies on Innate Signals from Spatially Positioned NKT Cells. Gaya, M, Barral, P, Burbage, M, Aggarwal, S, Montaner, B, Warren Navia, A, Aid, M, Tsui, C, Maldonado, P, Nair, U et al.. 2018. Cell 172, 517–533.e20. doi: 10.1016/j.cell.2017.11.036
- A switch from canonical to noncanonical autophagy shapes B cell responses. Martinez-Martin, N, Maldonado, P, Gasparrini, F, Frederico, B, Aggarwal, S, Gaya, M, Tsui, C, Burbage, M, Keppler, SJ, Montaner, B et al.. 2017. Science 355, 641–647. doi: 10.1126/science.aal3908
