= Mathematische Nachrichten =

- Discipline: Mathematics
- Language: English
- Edited by: Robert Denk

Publication details
- Frequency: Monthly
- Impact factor: 1.228 (2020)

Standard abbreviations
- ISO 4: Math. Nachr.

Indexing
- ISSN: 0025-584X (print); 1522-2616 (web)

Links
- Journal homepage

Mathematische Nachrichten (abbreviated Math. Nachr.; English: Mathematical News) is a mathematical journal published in 12 issues per year by Wiley-VCH GmbH. It should not be confused with the Internationale Mathematische Nachrichten, an unrelated publication of the Austrian Mathematical Society.

It was established in 1948 by East German mathematician Erhard Schmidt, who became its first editor-in-chief. At that time it was associated with the German Academy of Sciences at Berlin, and published by Akademie Verlag. After the fall of the Berlin Wall, Akademie Verlag was sold to VCH Verlagsgruppe Weinheim, which in turn was sold to John Wiley & Sons.

According to the 2020 edition of Journal Citation Reports, the journal had an impact factor of 1.228, ranking it 111th among 333 journals in the category "Mathematics". As of 2021, Ben Andrews, Robert Denk, Klaus Hulek and Frédéric Klopp are the editors-in-chief of the journal.
