= Spanish Statistics and Operations Research Society =

Spanish non-profit society

Spanish Society of Statistics and Operations Research
- Sociedad de Estadística e Investigación Operativa
- Abbreviation: SEIO
- Formation: 1962
- Legal status: Society
- Location: Spain
- Parent organization: Association of European Operational Research Societies, International Federation of Operational Research Societies
- Website: www.seio.es

The Spanish Society of Statistics and Operations Research (Spanish: Sociedad de Estadística e Investigación Operativa, SEIO) is the professional non-profit society for the scientific fields of Statistics and Operations Research in Spain. It was founded in 1962 and it is dedicated to the development, improvement and promotion of the methods and applications of Statistics and Operations Research in its widest possible sense. The society has an ultimate goal of putting Statistics and Operations Research to the service of science and society. The society is recognized by the International Federation of Operational Research Societies and its subgrouping, the Association of European Operational Research Societies, as the main national society for Operations Research in its country. SEIO is also member of CIMPA, Centre International de Mathématiques Pures et Appliquées, Confederación de Sociedades Científicas de España (COSCE), and of the European Mathematical Society (EMS).

== History ==
SEIO was created in 1962 initially as an Operations Research society. In 1976, the fields of Statistics and Computer Science were included in the society.

Since 1962 the society has had the following presidents:

- Fermín de la Sierra (1962–1969)
- Sixto Ríos García (1969–1984)
- Pilar Ibarrola Muñoz (1984–1986)
- Marco A. López Cerdá (1986–1989)
- Daniel Peña Sánchez de Rivera (1989–1992)
- Elías Moreno Bas (1992–1994)
- Jesús T. Pastor Ciurana (1994–1998)
- Rafael Infante Macías (1998–2001)
- Pedro Gil Álvarez (2001–2004)
- Domingo Morales González (2004–2007)
- Ignacio García Jurado (2007–2010)
- José Miguel Angulo Ibáñez (2010–2013)
- Leandro Pardo Llorente (2013–2016)
- Emilio Carrizosa Priego (2016–2019)
- Jesús López Fidalgo (2019–2022)
- Begoña Vitoriano Villanueva (2022–present)

== Governance ==
SEIO is governed by a three-year term president who manages the association with an executive council and two vice-presidents, one for statistics and one for operations research. There are also two academic councils, one per discipline. A president elect supports the president during one year. On a proposal of the members, within SEIO some working groups can be formed, based on either geographical or methodological and application affinity. The headquarters of SEIO is at the Universidad Complutense de Madrid, Facultad de Matemáticas, Despacho 502, 3 Plaza de Ciencias, 28040 Madrid, Spain.

== Membership ==
Currently (2016), SEIO has about 600 members – individuals (professors and researches from university and research institutions and professionals) and institutions from academia, industry and administration.

== Publications ==
SEIO publishes two journals, one in the area of Statistics and one in the field of Operations Research

The journal TEST, published by Springer, focuses on papers that offer original theoretical contributions and that have demonstrated potential value for applications. Methodological content is crucial for publication in the journal as is detailed coverage of practical implications. In 2015 it had an impact factor of 1.207.

The journal TOP, also published by Springer, publishes original findings in operations research and management sciences. Contributions investigate either mathematical issues or applications to real-world decision-making problems. The topics covered are continuous and discrete optimization, games, decision theory, logistics, production planning, stochastic models, simulation, and OR applications. In 2015 it had an impact factor of 0.927.

SEIO also publishes BEIO, (Boletín de Estadística e Investigación Operativa), a divulgative journal.

== Conferences ==
Every year and a half, SEIO organizes a national conference, usually attended by more than 200 participants. The working groups also organize smaller workshops on a regular basis.

== Awards ==
At every conference, SEIO announces an award for an outstanding career in the fields of Statistics and Operations research, the so-called Ramiro Melendreras price.
