= Schöbel =

Schöbel, Schobel, or Schoebel is a German surname. Notable people with this name include:

- Aaron Schobel (born 1977), American football player
- Alfred Schoebel (1911–2000), French swimmer
- Anita Schöbel (born 1969), German mathematician
- Charles Schoebel (1813–1888), French ethnologist, palaeographer and linguist
- Elmer Schoebel (1896–1970), American jazz pianist
- Frank Schöbel (born 1942), German pop singer
- Franz Schöbel (born 1956), German cross-country skier
- Gunter Schöbel (born 1959), German archaeologist
- Jean-Pierre Schoebel (born 1949), French decathlete
- Kurt Schöbel (born 1896), German sports shooter
- Pierre Schoebel (born 1942), French hurdler
- Simon Schobel (born 1950), Romanian handball player
- Tanner Schobel (born 2001), American baseball player
