= Hungarian Operations Research Society =

Hungarian non-profit society

HORS, Hungarian Operations Research Society
- Formation: 1991
- Legal status: Society
- Purpose: To promote operations research
- Region served: Hungary
- Parent organization: Association of European Operational Research Societies International Federation of Operational Research Societies
- Website: mot.org.hu/en/index.html

The Hungarian Operations Research Society (HORS) is the professional non-profit society for the scientific field of Operations Research in Hungary. The society is recognized by the International Federation of Operational Research Societies and its subgrouping, the Association of European Operational Research Societies, as the main national society for Operations Research in its country,

== Aims and scope ==
The main aims of the society are to

- provide information relevant to the scientific public life in operations research (OR),
- spread the OR culture,
- build and maintain ties with similar scientific societies at domestic (Bolyai János Mathematical Society, John von Neumann Computer Society) and international (EURO, IFORS) level,
- organize domestic and international conferences, workshops.

Hungary has a long tradition in cultivating the theory and application of OR. Researchers have contributed to several areas of this scientific discipline. OR is included in the curriculum of college and university education. Among universities that offer OR related courses and also degree it is worth mentioning Budapest University of Technology and Economics, Corvinus University of Budapest, University of Debrecen, Eötvös Loránd University, Óbuda University, University of Pannonia, Széchenyi István University, and University of Szeged. The doctoral (PhD) schools of these universities offer research topics in OR within mathematics, computer science, informatics and engineering.

The importance of OR has been recognized also by the Hungarian Academy of Sciences (HAS). As a result, HAS has set up the Academic Committee of Operations Research. Many members of the committee are also members of HORS.

== History ==
Operations Research (OR) was introduced in Hungary by Prof. András Prékopa in 1959. It rapidly raised considerable interest in academic and industrial circles. The first Hungarian Conference on Operations Research was held in 1967 with over 100 participants. While subsequent conferences were organized on a regular basis the official formation of the Hungarian Operations Research Society (HORS) dates to 1991. The membership consists of ordinary members, students, retired members as well as honorary members and sponsors. Members (except honorary) pay membership fee which makes the society self-supporting.

== Governance ==
The society is governed by the Presidium elected for three years and consisting of a President, Vice President, Secretary and two members.

The Honorary President of HORS is Prof. Acad. András Prékopa. In 2014–2017 the President was Prof. István Maros. The current President is Prof. Miklós Pintér.

== Awards ==
HORS recognizes the lasting philanthropic contributions OR activities of its members by awarding the Egerváry memorial plaquette to at most one person a year.

== Conferences ==
HORS organizes/co-organizes two series of conferences: since 2004 every other year VOCAL (Veszprém Optimization Conference: Advanced Algorithms) an international conference co-organized with University of Pannónia (Veszprém, HU) and in the gap years Hungarian Conference on Operations Research. Both series are well attended.

Hungarian operations researchers organized a series of Mathematical Programming Conferences in Mátrafüred and Mátraháza (Hungary) in the period of 1970 and 1980. The events were an important meeting point between OR people of East and West during the cold war. These series formed the basis of the more recent VOCAL conferences.

HORS played an important role in the success of the EURO 2000 (EURO XVII) conference held in Budapest, Hungary, as a co-organizer of the event.

== Publications ==
The society contributes to the maintenance of the Central European Journal of Operations Research (CEJOR).
