= Daniel Peña =

Daniel Peña may refer to:

- Daniel Peña (engineer) (born 1948), Spanish engineer
- Daniel Peña (novelist) (born 1988), Mexican-American novelist, essayist, and critic
- Dan Peña (Daniel S. Peña Sr., born 1945), American businessman
