= Hellenic Operational Research Society =

Non-profit research society based in Greece

HELORS, Hellenic Operational Research Society
- Formation: 1963
- Legal status: Society
- Purpose: To promote Operational Research
- Region served: Greece
- Parent organization: Association of European Operational Research Societies International Federation of Operational Research Societies
- Website: www.eeee.org.gr

The Hellenic Operational Research Society (HELORS) is the official non-profit society for the scientific field of Operations Research in Greece. The society is a member of the European umbrella organization, the Association of European Operational Research Societies, and of the International Federation of Operational Research Societies.

== History ==
HELORS was created in 1963, aiming to promote the tools and methodologies of Operational Research (OR) and Scientific Management, for the benefit of the Greek economy and society. In 1984 the Macedonia-Thrace annex of HELORS was founded, aiming primarily at the growth of OR in the greater area of Balkans and at the amelioration of the structures and communication of the HELORS members of northern Greece. HELORS corporate headquarters are located in Athens, where administrative council sits, in privately owned offices. Pioneering Hellenic OR Researchers in one of the first meetings of HELORS in the 60's are displayed on the photo.

== Governance ==
HELORS is managed by a board of 11 members. The Board consists of the president, two vice presidents, a general secretary, a special secretary, a cashier and five members of the General Council. Board members are elected by the members of HELORS every two years, in the premises of the society in Athens. The current president is Nikolaos Matsatsinis. Since HELORS establishment, its Presidents have been the following:

- 1963-1974: General Radamathis Spanogiannakis, Founder of HELORS
- 1974-1976: Professor Dimitris Xirokostas, National Technical University
- 1976-1978: Professor Ioannis Pappas, National Technical University
- 1979-1980: Professor Dimitris Xirokostas, National Technical University
- 1981-1984: Professor Dimitris Blesios, University of Piraeus
- 1985-1988: Professor Dimitris Papoulias, Kapodistrian University of Athens
- 1989-1990: Professor Konstantinos Papis, University of Piraeus
- 1991-1994: Konstantinos Vasiliadis, Executive Manager
- 1995-1996: Spiros Pashentis, Executive Manager
- 1997-1998: Professor Konstantinos Papis, University of Piraeus
- 1999-2004: Professor Ioannis Siskos, University of Piraeus
- 2005-2008: Professor Dionisios Giannakopoulos, Technical Institute of Piraeus
- 2009-2012: Professor Nikolaos Matsatsinis, Technical University of Crete
- 2013-2016: Professor John Psarras, National Technical University of Athens
- 2017-2020: Professor Nikolaos Matsatsinis, Technical University of Crete

== Membership ==
Currently (2019), the society has about 200 members - individuals and institutions from academia, industry and administration.

== Working Groups ==
For better organization and efficiency, the HELORS operates in working groups. Currently the following working groups have been approved and operate specialized in different topics:

- Multicriteria Decision Analysis (Group Coordinators: Prof. Yannis Siskos & Prof. Nikolaos Matsatsinis), and
- Operational Research in Health (Group coordinator: Prof. Aris Sissouras).

The Multicriteria Decision Analysis group has already organized thirteen (13) meetings in Multicriteria Analysis and one (1) seminar on Multiple Criteria Decision Aid. In the near future, more working groups are expected to approve and operate.

== Publications ==
HELORS issues the scientific journal Operational Research: An International Journal – ORIJ. ORIJ publishes high quality scientific papers that contribute significantly to the fields of Operational Research and Management Science (OR/MS). As of the beginning of 2008, ORIJ is published by Springer. Operational Research - An International Journal (ORIJ) Impact Factor for 2017 is 1.816 (Thomson Reuters Journal Citation Reports).

== Awards ==
The 'National Award and Operational Research Gold Medal' is awarded annually by HELORS to distinguished Greek researchers with outstanding contribution to the Operational Research field. To date, the following awards have been awarded:

- 1999 General Radamathis Spanogiannakis, Hellas
- 2000 Professor Dimitris Bertsekas, Massachusetts Institute of Technology (MIT), USA
- 2001 Professor Panagiotis Pardalos, University of Florida, USA
- 2002 Professor Spyros Makridakis, INSEAD, France
- 2003 Professor Dimitris Xirokostas, National Technical University, Hellas
- 2004 Professor Dimitris Bertsimas, Massachusetts Institute of Technology (MIT), USA.
- 2005 Professor Yannis Siskos, University of Piraeus, Hellas
- 2006 Professor Biron Papathanasiou, Aristotle University of Thessaloniki, Hellas
- 2007 Professor Vangelis Paschos, University Paris-Dauphine, France.
- 2008 Professor Aristidis Sisouras, University of Patras, Hellas.
- 2009 Professor Konstantinos Zopounidis, Technical University of Crete, Hellas.
- 2012 Professor Kostas Paparizos, Macedonian University, Hellas.
- 2013 Professor Christodoulos Floudas, Princeton University, USA
- 2014 Professor Kostas Tsouros, Aristotle University of Thessaloniki, Hellas
- 2015 Professor Emmanouil Samouilidis, National Technical University, Hellas
- 2016 Professor Nikolaos Sahinidis, Carnegie Mellon University, USA
- 2017 Professor John Tsitsiklis, Massachusetts Institute of Technology, USA.
- 2018 Professor Markos Papageorgiou, Technical University of Crete, Hellas.

== Conferences ==
HELORS has organized 30 National Conferences, with more than 6000 participants and announcements, as well as 11th International and 4th Balkan Conferences. The MCDA Working Group has additionally organized 13th meetings and 1 seminar on Multiple Criteria Decision Aid.

Among those conferences was the:

- 12th International Conference on Operational Research of the International Federation of OR Societies (IFORS), which was held in Athens 25–29 June 1990. It was then recognized as the best, in terms of quality and content of IFORS conferences, and had brought together 700 scientists from all around the globe.
- The 20th European Operational Research Societies (EURO) conference: "OR and the Management of Electronic Services" in Rhodes during 4–7 July 2004.

HELORS has undertaken to organize the next EURO conference:

- 31st European Conference on Operational Research (EURO 2021), 11 – 14 July 2021, Athens.

1st Meeting of the Hellenic Working Group on Multiple Criteria Decision Aiding (Chania 2003)
