= Belgian Society for Operations Research =

Belgian nonprofit society

ORBEL, Belgian Society for Operations Research
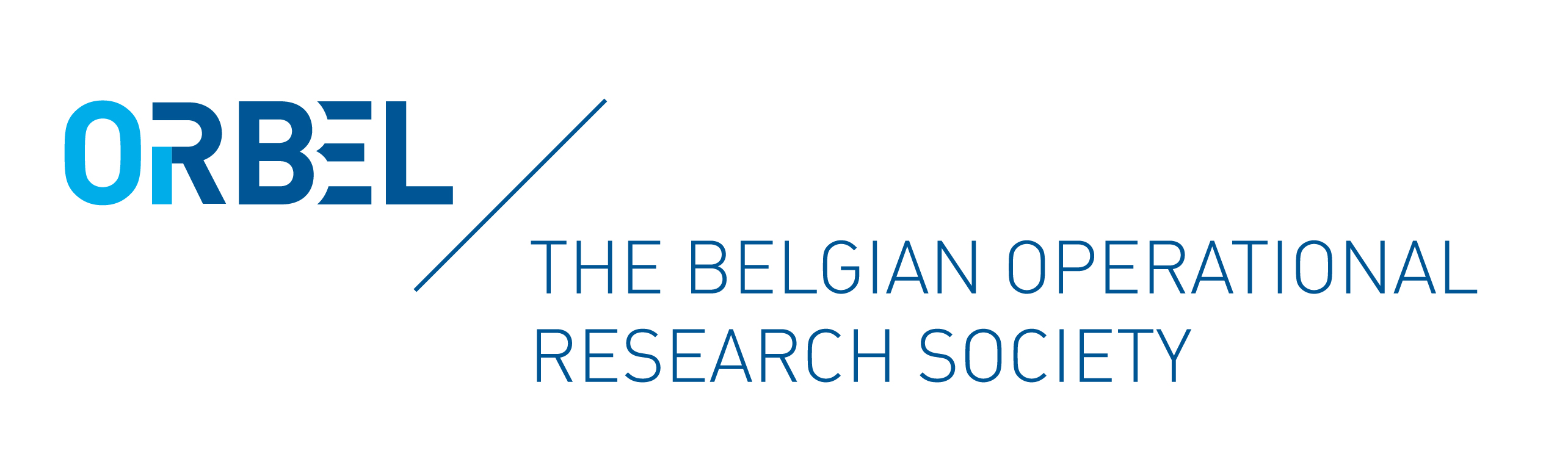
- Formation: 1961
- Legal status: Society
- Region served: Belgium
- Parent organization: Association of European Operational Research Societies; International Federation of Operational Research Societies
- Website: www.orbel.be

The Belgian Society for Operations Research (ORBEL) is the professional non-profit society for the scientific field of Operations Research in Belgium. The society is recognized by the International Federation of Operational Research Societies and its subgrouping, the Association of European Operational Research Societies, as the main national society for Operations Research in its country.

ORBEL was created in 1961 with the aim of promoting the development of Operations Research and Mathematical Programming in Belgium, both from a methodological point and an applied research point of views. The recognition of operations research, and the promotion of professional relationships between operations researchers, inside and outside Italy, are goals of ORBEL.

Recent presidents are:

- Raymond Bisdorff (2009–2011)
- Patrick De Causmaecker (2011–2013)
- Yves Crama (2013–2015)
- Frits Spieksma (2015–2018)
- Kenneth Sörensen (2019–2020)
- Yasemin Arda (2021–2022)

ORBEL is governed by a president, with two-year term, who presides the Board of Administration, consisting of about 10 persons elected by the members of the executive committee, including the President, the Vice President and for one year the President Elect.

Currently (2016), ORBEL has over 100 members - both professors and researchers from universities, as well as professionals working in industry or government.

Jointly with the Italian Operations Research Society and the French Operations Research Society, ORBEL publishes 4OR - A Quarterly Journal of Operations Research, in which methodological and applied papers are published as well as surveys on topic particularly relevant in the field of operations research. The society's publisher is Springer. Until 2001, ORBEL was responsible for the publication of the scientific journal JORBEL, the Belgian Journal of Operations Research, Statistics, and Computer Science.

Once a year, usually at the end of January, ORBEL organizes a scientific conference, attended by about 120 participants.

During its conference, ORBEL announces two awards: (i) the ORBEL award for the best master thesis in operations research published by a Belgian university, (ii) the Wolsey award for the best OR related open source implementation.
