= Vitoriano (surname) =

Vitoriano is a surname. Notable people with the surname include:

- Begoña Vitoriano (born 1967), Spanish operations researcher
- José Vitoriano (1918–2006), Portuguese politician
