= Renata Mansini =

Italian applied mathematician, economist

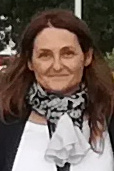
- Renata Mansini at the EUROYoung workshop in 2022.
- Born: 22 August 1968 (age 58)
- Occupation: Professor of operations research

Academic background
- Education: University of Brescia
- Alma mater: University of Bergamo
- Thesis: Mixed integer linear programming models for financial problems: analysis, algorithms, and computational results (1997)

Academic work
- Discipline: Applied mathematics
- Sub-discipline: Mathematical optimization
- Institutions: University of Brescia

Renata Mansini (born 22 August 1968) is an Italian applied mathematician, economist, and operations researcher known for her research on problems in mathematical optimization including portfolio optimization and vehicle routing. She is a professor of operations research at the University of Brescia.

== Education ==
Mansini earned a laurea in economics and business from the University of Brescia in 1991–1992, winning a prize from the Associazione Italiana di Studio del Lavoro for the best thesis in applied mathematics. She completed a doctorate in 1996–1997 at the University of Bergamo, with the dissertation Modelli di programmazione lineare mista intera per problemi finanziari: analisi, algoritmi e risultati computazionali [mixed integer linear programming models for financial problems: analysis, algorithms, and computational results].

== Book ==
Mansini is the co-author, with Włodzimierz Ogryczak and M. Grazia Speranza, of the book Linear and Mixed Integer Programming for Portfolio Optimization (EURO Advanced Tutorials on Operational Research, Springer, 2015).
