= German Operations Research Society =

Professional non-profit society

GOR, German Operations Research Society
- Formation: 1998
- Legal status: Society
- Purpose: To promote operations research
- Region served: Germany
- Parent organization: Association of European Operational Research Societies International Federation of Operational Research Societies
- Website: gor-ev.de

The Gesellschaft für Operations Research (GOR) is the professional non-profit society for the scientific field of Operations Research in Germany. The society is a member of the European umbrella organization, the Association of European Operational Research Societies (EURO), and of the International Federation of Operational Research Societies (IFORS).

== History ==
The history of the present-day society began in 1956 with the foundation of the Working Group Operations Research (Arbeitskreis Operations Research, AKOR) which was fairly practically orientated. In 1961, the German Society for Operations Research (Deutsche Gesellschaft für Unternehmensforschung, DGU) with a rather academic background was founded. Both societies merged in 1972 and became the German Operations Research Society (Deutsche Gesellschaft für Operations Research, DGOR).

By the end of the 1970s some members with a theoretical focus did not find anymore their interests enough represented by the rather practical DGOR. Hence, they founded the Society for Mathematics, Economics and Operations Research (Gesellschaft für Mathematik, Ökonomie und Operations Research, GMÖOR) in 1979. From 1995 on, they again realized common conferences. On January 1, 1998, both societies joined for today's Society for Operations Research (Gesellschaft für Operations Research, GOR).

== Governance ==
The society's affairs are managed by an executive board of four members, including the president. Its affairs are overseen by an advisory board consisting of fifteen members. Both institutions are elected every second year. For administrative work the society maintains a secretary.

== Membership ==
Currently (2014), the society has about 1200 members including both individuals and institutions.

== Publications ==
Beside their member journal "OR News" the German OR Society publishes with Springer two scientific journals: Operations Research Spectrum (OR Spectrum) and Mathematical Methods of Operations Research (MMOR). Additionally, a monthly newsletter is distributed to the members.

== Conferences ==
Once a year, the German OR Society organizes a national conference, attended by 500 to 900 participants. The society maintains strong relations with the Austrian Society of Operations Research (Österreichische Gesellschaft für Operations Research, ÖGOR), the Swiss Association for Operations Research (Schweizerische Vereinigung für Operations Research, SVOR), therefore every four years the conference is a joint one with ÖGOR and SVOR. At irregular intervals common conferences with the Dutch Society for Operations Research (Nederlandse Genootschap voor Besliskunde, NGB) are organized. In addition to the yearly conference, the society's working groups meet about once a year.

== Working groups ==
Within the German Society for Operations Research fifteen working groups are constituted:

- Analytics
- Decision Theory and Practice
- Finance and Financial Institutions
- Fuzzy Systems, Neural Networks and Artificial Intelligence
- Healthcare Management
- Logistics and Transportation
- OR and Environment
- OR in Engineering Science
- Real World Mathematical Optimization
- Pricing & Revenue Management
- Forecasting Methods and Applications
- Project Management and Scheduling
- Simulation and Optimization of Complex Systems
- Supply Chain Management
- Information Systems

The working groups organize regular workshops in which experts from economy, administration, consulting companies and academia meet and discuss current topics. The working groups usually get together once or twice a year, often in cooperation with a company.

== Prizes ==
The GOR awards different prizes on its yearly conference: A respective jury elects yearly up to four winners of the GOR Master Thesis Award and the GOR Dissertation Award. Every second year the society honors one person for their lifetime achievement with the GOR Scientific Award and grants the GOR Company Award to an enterprise that commits itself to the application and dissemination of operations research.

A prize for the best bachelor thesis can be awarded to one student per year by each German academic department.
