= Swedish Operations Research Association =

SOAF, Swedish Operations Research Association
- Formation: 1959
- Legal status: Society
- Purpose: promoting the development within the different branches of operations research, and work for its application within different problem domains
- Region served: Sweden
- Parent organization: Association of European Operational Research Societies International Federation of Operational Research Societies
- Website: www.soaf.se

The Swedish Operations Research Association (SOAF; in Swedish: Svenska Operationsanalysföreningen) is a professional non-profit association for the promotion and dissemination of the scientific field of operations research in Sweden. SOAF was founded in 1959 with the dual purpose of promoting the development within the different branches of operations research, and work for its application within different problem domains. The association is a member of the European umbrella organization, the Association of European Operational Research Societies (EURO), and of the International Federation of Operational Research Societies (IFORS).

== History ==
SOAF was inaugurated in early 1959, inspired by the First International Conference on Operations Research in Oxford, England in 1957, where Sweden had 17 participants, ranking fourth among the participating nations. SOAF joined IFORS in 1960, and was one of the founding members of EURO in 1975. It hosted the second EURO conference in Stockholm in 1976.

== Governance ==
The society is managed by a board consisting of up to eight members. The board should always have a President, a Vice President, a Secretary, a Treasurer, and an Editor. The board is elected by the members at the annual meeting for a period of one year.

== Membership ==
SOAF offers membership to both organizations and individuals. Currently (2018), the society has 22 organizations and 19 individuals as members. Ten of the member organizations are companies, eight are academic institutes, and four are governmental authorities. The majority of the organizations are active in the domain of transportation and logistics, but other areas such as, e.g., maintenance, health care and military defense, are represented as well.

== Publications ==
Together with the Danish Operations Research Society, SOAF publishes the ORbit magazine twice a year.

== Conferences ==
SOAF organizes a bi-annual national conference in operations research. In 2013, the conference was organized in co-operation with the Danish OR Society and the Norwegian OR Society as the joint conference SOAK (Svenska OperationsanalysKonferensen in Swedish) and NOS6 (The 6th Nordic Optimization Symposium) at Chalmers University of Technology in Gothenburg. The conference attracted approximately 80 participants.
