= M. Grazia Speranza =

Italian mathematician (born 1957)

- Occupation: Professor of Operations Research
- Known for: Contributions to mathematical optimization
- Title: President, International Federation of Operational Research Societies
- Awards: EURO Gold Medal

Academic work
- Institutions: University of Brescia

Maria Grazia Speranza (born 30 March 1957) is an Italian applied mathematician and operations researcher. Her research involves the application of mathematical optimization to problems including portfolio optimization and the combination of inventory management with vehicle routing.

She is a professor of operations research in the faculty of economics and business of the University of Brescia, a former vice chancellor and dean at the university, the former president of the Association of European Operational Research Societies and the INFORMS Transportation Science and Logistics Society, and the president of the International Federation of Operational Research Societies.

In 2024, she was awarded the EURO Gold Medal, the highest distinction within Operations Research in Europe.

== Education and early career ==
Speranza graduated from the University of Milan with a master's degree in applied mathematics in 1980 and a doctorate in applied mathematics in 1983. She arrived at the University of Brescia in 1990 after working as an assistant professor at the University of Milan from 1983 to 1987 and an associate professor at the University of Udine from 1987 to 1990. In 1994, she was promoted to full professor at the Faculty of Economics and business at the University of Brescia.

== Research area and interests ==
Resource allocation and project scheduling, logistics, portfolio optimization, combinatorial optimization, and vehicle routing have been the key areas of her scientific endeavor. Mixed integer programming models, computational complexity, worst-case analysis, exact (branch-and-cut and branch-and-price) and heuristic algorithms have been her primary areas of research.

She has collaborated on scientific projects with both Italian and foreign colleagues, and she has co-authored publications with some of the greatest scholars like Hans Kellerer and Ulrich Pferschy of the University of Graz (Austria), Zsolt Tuza of the Hungarian Academy of Science - Budapest (Hungary), Dimitri Bertsekas of the Massachusetts Institute of Technology (U.S.A.), Michel Gendreau, Gilbert Laporte, and Alain Hertz of the University of Montreal (Canada), Martin Savelsbergh of the Georgia Institute of Technology (U.S.A. (Canada).

== Administrative and society service ==
=== Committee appointments ===
She is a former president of the Association of European Operational Research Societies (EURO) from 2011 to 2012, and president of the INFORMS Transportation Science and Logistics Society (TLS) from 2013. She was the president of the International Federation of Operational Research Societies (IFORS) for 2019–2021.

=== University appointments ===
Grazia has served as the President of the Research Council at the University of Brescia (1998–2000) and later appointed as the Dean of the Faculty of Economics and business at the same university (2002–2008). She was appointed as the Deputy Rector of the university twice from 2000 to 2002 and again from 2017 to 2020. She has been serving as the president of the Research center on 'Models for the economy and management of transport and logistics' since 2006.

=== Positions in boards of directors ===
She is the member of the Board of Directors of a2a, a multi-utility company and the 15th largest Italian company. She is also one of the Board of Directors of Fondazione Comunita' Bresciana and Fondazione Nocivelli.

== Other memberships activities ==
She has coordinated several research initiatives that have received funding from the Ministry of Higher Education, the National Research Council, and the European Union. In specifically, she led a study in "Industrial logistics" involving 12 research units as part of the National Research Council's Finalized Transportation Program 2. From 1990 to 1996, she served on the board of the Italian Operations Research Society.

She has served on committees to evaluate PhD theses from institutions throughout the world, including Troyes (France), Trondheim (Norway), Lausanne (Switzerland), and Lancaster (England) (UK).

== Selected publications ==
She has over 366 articles published in journals with over 13360 citations.

=== Peer-reviewed articles ===
- A sequential approach for a multi-commodity two-echelon distribution problem, (with C. Archetti, D. Cattaruzza, W. Gu, M. Ogier, F. Semet)
- Optimization models for fair horizontal collaboration in demand-responsive transportation (with E. Angelelli, V. Morandi)
- Optimization in multimodal distribution problems: a survey, to appear in European Journal of Operational Research (with C.Archetti, L.Peirano)
- A Kernel Search Heuristic for a Fair Facility Location Problem, to appear in Computers & Operations Research (with C. Filippi, G. Guastaroba, D. L. Huerta-Munoz, M. G. Speranza)
- A Kernel Search heuristic for the Multi-Vehicle Inventory Routing Problem, to appear in International Transactions of Operations Research (with C.Archetti, G. Guastaroba, D. Huerta-Mu˜noz, M.G. Speranza)
- System optimal routing of traffic flows with user constraints using linear programming, to appear in European Journal of Operational Research (with E. Angelelli, V. Morandi, M. Savelsbergh)
- On single source capacitated facility location with cost and fairness objectives, European Journal of Operational Research 289, 959–974, 2021 (con C.Filippi, G.Guastaroba)
- A branch-and-cut algorithm for the inventory routing problem with pickups and deliveries, European Journal of Operational Research 282, 886–895, 2020 (with C. Archetti, M. Boccia, A. Sforza, M.G. Speranza, C. Sterle)
- Dynamic traveling salesman problem with stochastic release dates, European Journal of Operational Research 280, 832–844, 2020 (with C. Archetti, D. Feillet, A. Mor)
- Flexible two-echelon location routing, European Journal of Operational Research 277, 1124–1136, 2019 (with C. Archetti, L. C. Coelho, M. Darvish)

=== Books ===
Speranza is the co-author, with Renata Mansini and Włodzimierz Ogryczak, of the book Linear and Mixed Integer Programming for Portfolio Optimization (EURO Advanced Tutorials in Operational Research, Springer, 2015).

Some of her other books are:

- Quantitative approaches to distribution logistics and supply chain management, Springer Science & Business Media, vol. 519, 2012 (with A. Klose, L.N. Van Wassenhove, eds)
- New trends in distribution logistics, Springer Science & Business Media, vol. 480, 2012 (with P. St¨ahly, eds)
- Advances in distribution logistics, Lecture Notes in Economics and Mathematical Systems, Springer-Verlag, vol.460, 2012 (with B. Fleischmann, J. van Nunen, P. St¨ahly, eds)
- Methodology, implementation and applications of Decision Support Systems, CISM Courses and Lectures 320, Springer Verlag, 1991 (with A.Lewandowski, P.Serafini, eds)
