= Polish Operational and Systems Research Society =

Polish research society

PTBOiS / POSRS, Polish Operational and Systems Research Society
- Formation: 1986
- Legal status: Society
- Region served: Poland
- Parent organization: Association of European Operational Research Societies International Federation of Operational Research Societies
- Website: www.ptbois.org.pl

The Polish Operational and Systems Research Society, POSRS (in Polish: Polskie Towarzystwo Badań Operacyjnych i Systemowych, PTBOiS) is the Polish scientific, scholarly and professional non-profit society for the advancements of operational and systems research (OR/SR). The society is the core active body of the Association of Polish Operational Research Societies (ASPORS), the formal member of the International Federation of Operational Research Societies and its subsidiary, the Association of European Operational Research Societies.

== History ==
The POSRS (PTBOiS) was established in 1986 with the objective of promoting the development of operational and systems research in Poland, in both methodological and applied research aspects. The society aims at mobilising the Polish community of specialists in the respective fields, within the academia as well as in business and administration.

The POSRS/PTBOiS has since its founding gathered top Polish researchers and scholars in its fields of activities, including members of various academies of sciences, fellows of IEEE, EurAI, IFSA, etc., presidents of various international societies, e.g., IFORS, IFSA, RSS, etc., awardees of top OR/SR prizes exemplified by the EURO Gold Medal, IEEE Pioneer Awards, etc. Since the beginning, and for a long period of time, the president of the society has been Professor Andrzej Straszak. Currently, the president is Professor Janusz Kacprzyk.

The society cooperates very closely with virtually all top Polish research and scholarly institutions, public administration, industry and business, notably with the Systems Research Institute, Polish Academy of Sciences(Instytut Badań Systemowych PAN) and the Institute of Computing Science, Poznań University of Technology. The POSRS constitutes the core society of the Association of Polish Operational Research Societies.

== Governance ==
The society is chaired by the president, and the day-to-day operations are carried out by the board, with two vice-presidents, the secretary general and the treasurer, the board now consisting of altogether 11 persons. The main body of the society is the General Assembly, electing the board, the president, and the Controlling Commission.

The seat of the society is located at the Systems Research Institute, Polish Academy of Sciences in Warsaw.

== Membership ==
As of the end of 2016, the society had some 100 members, mainly from the research and scholarly institutions, with a noticeable part from the public administration, business and industry.

== Publications ==
For roughly 20 years POSRS (PTBOiS) had been publishing regularly the proceedings of its continuing conference series, altogether several dozen volumes between 1986 and 2008. On the top of this, occasional volumes were published, resulting, in particular, from the activity of the society's working group MODEST (MODelling of Economies and Societies in Transition). The members of the POSRS have also published numerous books, edited volumes, and hundreds of papers in highly respected journals and conference proceedings. For example:

1. J. Błażewicz, K. Ecker, E. Pesch, G. Schmidt, M. Sterna, J. Węglarz, “Handbook on Scheduling”. Springer Verlag, Berlin, New York, 2nd edition (1000 pp.), 2018, forthcoming.
2. M. Cichenski, F. Jaehn, G. Pawlak, E. Pesch, G. Singh, J. Błażewicz, “An integrated model for the transshipment yard scheduling problem”, Journal of Scheduling 20, 2017, pp. 57–65.
3. J. Błażewicz, N. Szostak, S. Wasik, “Understanding Life: A Bioinformatics Perspective”, European Review 25, 2017, pp. 231–245.
4. R. Słowiński, Y. Yao (eds.), “Rough Sets”. Part C of the Handbook of Computational Intelligence, edited by J. Kacprzyk and W. Pedrycz, Springer, Berlin, 2015, pp. 329–451.
5. J. Kacprzyk, M. Krawczak, G. Szkatuła, „On bilateral matching between fuzzy sets” in: Information Sciences, Volume 402, Elsevier, 2017, pp. 244–266.
6. F.F. Fagioli, L. Rocchi, L. Paolotti, R. Słowiński, A. Boggia, “From the farm to the agri-food system: A multiple criteria framework to evaluate extended multi-functional value” in: Ecological Indicators 79, Elsevier, 2017, pp. 91–102.
7. M. Zimniewicz, K. Kurowski, J. Węglarz, “Scheduling aspects in keyword extraction problem”, in: International Transactions in Operational Research, IFORS, 2017, to appear.

Nowadays, the society cooperates with several journals exemplified by the Journal of Operations Research and Decisions, Control and Cybernetics, Journal of Automation, Mobile Robotics and Intelligent Systems.

== Conferences ==
The flagship conference series of the PORSR is the biannual BOS (the Polish acronym for Operational and Systems Research) conferences which gather some 100 - 150 participants, both from Poland and abroad. In addition, the POSRS (PTBOiS) co-organizes and co-sponsors numerous other events, both national and international, together with its closely cooperating institutions.

Moreover, the POSRS was a co-organizer of EURO 2016 - 28th European Conference on Operational Research (3-6.07.2016), held in Poznań, at the Poznań University of Technology, one of the leading European centers in decision analysis, optimization, project management, and scheduling.

Program and Organizing Committees were chaired by Professor Daniele Vigo from the University of Bologna and Professor Joanna Józefowska from the Poznań University of Technology, respectively.

It is also worth noting the role of members of the organizing committee and pillars of the Operations Research and Management Science group at the Poznań University of Technology: Professors Jacek Błażewicz, Roman Słowiński and Jan Węglarz, in the support and organization process of the EURO 2016 conference that stimulated communication and cooperation among the most important European operational researchers.

== Awards ==
The society awards medals for outstanding achievements in the field of operational and systems research. Special awards for book publications and for young researchers are also planned.

Among the prizes won by the members of POSRS (PTBOiS) it is worth emphasizing EURO Gold Medal won by Professors: Jacek Błażewicz, Roman Słowiński, and Jan Węglarz, leaders of the Operations Research and Management Science group established within the Faculty of Computing at Poznań University of Technology.
