= Finnish Operations Research Society =

Finnish non-profit society

FORS, Finnish Operations Research Society
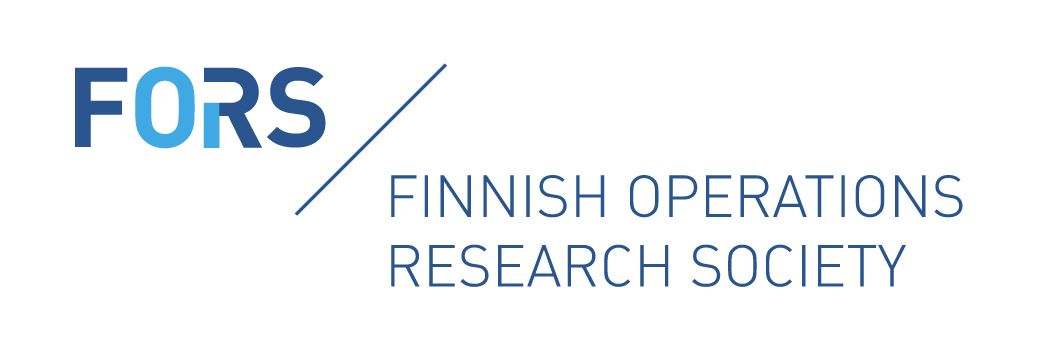
- Formation: 1973
- Legal status: Society
- Region served: Finland
- Parent organization: Association of European Operational Research Societies International Federation of Operational Research Societies
- Website: www.operaatiotutkimus.fi

The Finnish Operations Research Society (FORS) (in Finnish, Suomen Operaatiotutkimusseura ry) is a professional non-profit society for the scientific field of Operations Research in Finland. The society is recognized by the International Federation of Operational Research Societies and its subgrouping, the Association of European Operational Research Societies, as the main national society for Operations Research in its country.

== History ==
The society was established in 1973. It was founded by 60 people interested in OR who worked in business, public administration and academia.

== Governance ==
The management of the society is overseen by a board of 6 members, including chairman, secretary and four other members and 6 deputy members. The board is elected annually.

The current president is Giovanni Misitano. Honorary presidents of FORS include Christer Carlsson, Pekka Korhonen, Raimo Hämäläinen and Jyrki Wallenius.

== Membership ==
Currently (2014), the society has about 210 members - individuals and institutions from academia, industry and administration.

== Publications ==
FORS publishes a newsletter, which is aimed at members of the society. The content includes topical OR related news, announcements of events, conference trip stories and summaries of theses published in Finland. Most of the content is in Finnish language.

== Conferences ==
The society organizes one to two seminars per year. The size ranges. Smaller events can have about 20 participants and larger events even 100.
