= Croatian Operational Research Society =

Croatian nonprofit society

Croatian Operational Research Society (CRORS)
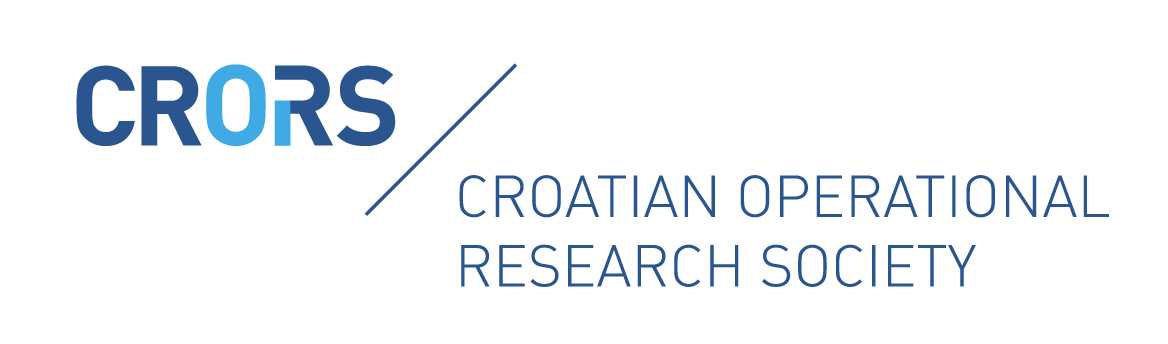
- Formation: 1992
- Legal status: Society
- Region served: Croatia
- Parent organization: Association of European Operational Research Societies International Federation of Operational Research Societies
- Website: www.hdoi.hr

The Croatian Operational Research Society (CRORS) is the professional non-profit society for the scientific field of Operations Research in Croatia. Its main mission is to promote operational research in Croatia and worldwide for the benefit of science and society. Since 1994, CRORS has been recognized by the International Federation of Operational Research Societies and its subgrouping, the Association of European Operational Research Societies, as the main national society for Operations Research in Croatia, and CRORS actively participates in international promotion of operational research.

== History ==
The Croatian Operational Research Society was established in 1992. as the only scientific society in Croatia specialized in operational research. Two groups of OR people, one from Zagreb and the other from Split, were active in organizing the OR Conference KOI ‘91 and establishing the CRORS, together with colleagues from Varaždin, Rijeka, Ljubljana and Maribor. In March 1992, The Founding meeting of CRORS was held at the Faculty of economics in Zagreb. The Statutes of CRORS were acquired at that meeting, and the Board of directors with a Supervisory board was elected. The first president was Prof. Luka Neralić from the University of Zagreb, Faculty of Economics Zagreb.

== Governance ==
The main board of the society consists of a President, Vice President, Secretary and Treasurer. The society is managed by an Executive Committee consisting of 17 members; the Supervisory Board and Board of Ethics consists of 3 members. All members of the boards are elected by the membership.

== Membership ==
As of 2014, the society has 150 members - individuals and institutions from academia, industry and administration.

== Publications ==
Scientific journal Croatian Operational Research Review (CRORR), ISSN 1848-0225 (Print), ISSN 1848-9931 (Online) is published by Croatian Operational Research Society and Co-publishers: Faculty of Economics in Osijek (University of Osijek), Department of Mathematics (University of Osijek), Faculty of Economic (University of Split), Faculty of Economics and Business (University of Zagreb). From 2013 onwards, CRORR journal aims to publish regular issues as well as special issues from KOI conferences. The CRORR journal is published in two numbers per year. Full-text of all published issues is available online at Published Volumes. All issues are also available at the Hrcak database - Portal of scientific journals of Croatia

Book of Abstracts of KOI Conferences consists of abstracts of invited and contributed papers presented at the International Conference on Operational Research, organized by Croatian Operational Research Society (CRORS). Books of Abstracts from recent KOI conferences are available online.

CRORS News is the official magazine of the Croatian Operational Research Society published yearly with two purposes:

- to bring an overview of the activities of the CRORS society and its members during a calendar year;
- to promote the area of operational research by publishing articles on novel and promising research topics, conferences, workshops, and collaboration of OR researchers with businesses.

== Conferences ==
The International Conference on Operational Research (KOI) is the major event organized by the Croatian Operational Research Society since 1991. In the period from 1991-1996. it was organized every year, while from the 1996. to today, it is organized every two years (in odd years).

The 15th International Conference on Operational Research KOI 2014 took place in Osijek, Croatia, on September 24–26, 2014.
