= Ulrike Leopold-Wildburger =

Austrian mathematical economist

- Education: University of Graz
- Awards: Austrian Cross of Honour for Science and Art, First Class

Ulrike Leopold-Wildburger (born 1949) is an Austrian mathematical economist, applied mathematician, and operations researcher. She is a professor emeritus at the University of Graz, where she headed the department of statistics and operations research, and is a former president of the Austrian Society of Operations Research.

== Education and career ==
Leopold-Wildburger studied mathematics, philosophy, and logic at the University of Graz from 1967 to 1972, earning a master of science in 1971 and a master of philosophy in 1972. She completed a Ph.D. at the University of Graz in 1975, and earned a habilitation in operations research and mathematical economics there in 1982.

She joined the teaching staff at the University of Graz as a lecturer in mathematical economics in 1972, and became an assistant professor in 1983. She became a professor of mathematics and informatics at the University of Klagenfurt in 1986, a professor of operations research at the University of Zurich in 1988, and a professor of mathematical economics at the University of Minnesota in 1991, before returning to Graz as a professor of statistics and operations research.

She headed the department from 1996 to 1998, and was dean of studies in the faculty of economics and social sciences from 2001 to 2004. She returned to her position as head of department in 2010. She was president of the Austrian Society of Operations Research from 1993 to 1997.

== Books ==
With Gerald A. Heuer, Leopold-Wildburger is the coauthor of the books Balanced Silverman Games on General Discrete Sets (1991) and Silverman’s Game: A Special Class of Two-Person Zero-Sum Games (1995), concerning Silverman's game.

Leopold-Wildburger is a coauthor of The Knowledge Ahead Approach to Risk: Theory and Experimental Evidence (With Robin Pope and Johannes Leitner, 2007). She is also a coauthor of two German-language textbooks, Einführung in die Wirtschaftsmathematik (Introduction to Mathematical Economics, with Jochen Hülsmann, Wolf Gamerith, and Werner Steindl, 1998; 5th ed., 2010) and Verfassen und Vortragen: Wissenschaftliche Arbeiten und Vorträge leicht gemacht (with Jörg Schütze, 2002).

== Recognition ==
Leopold-Wildburger was given the Austrian Cross of Honour for Science and Art, First Class in 2010. She became a member of the Academia Europaea in 2011.
