= Association of European Operational Research Societies =

Regional grouping to promote Operational Research

EURO
- The Association of European Operational Research Societies
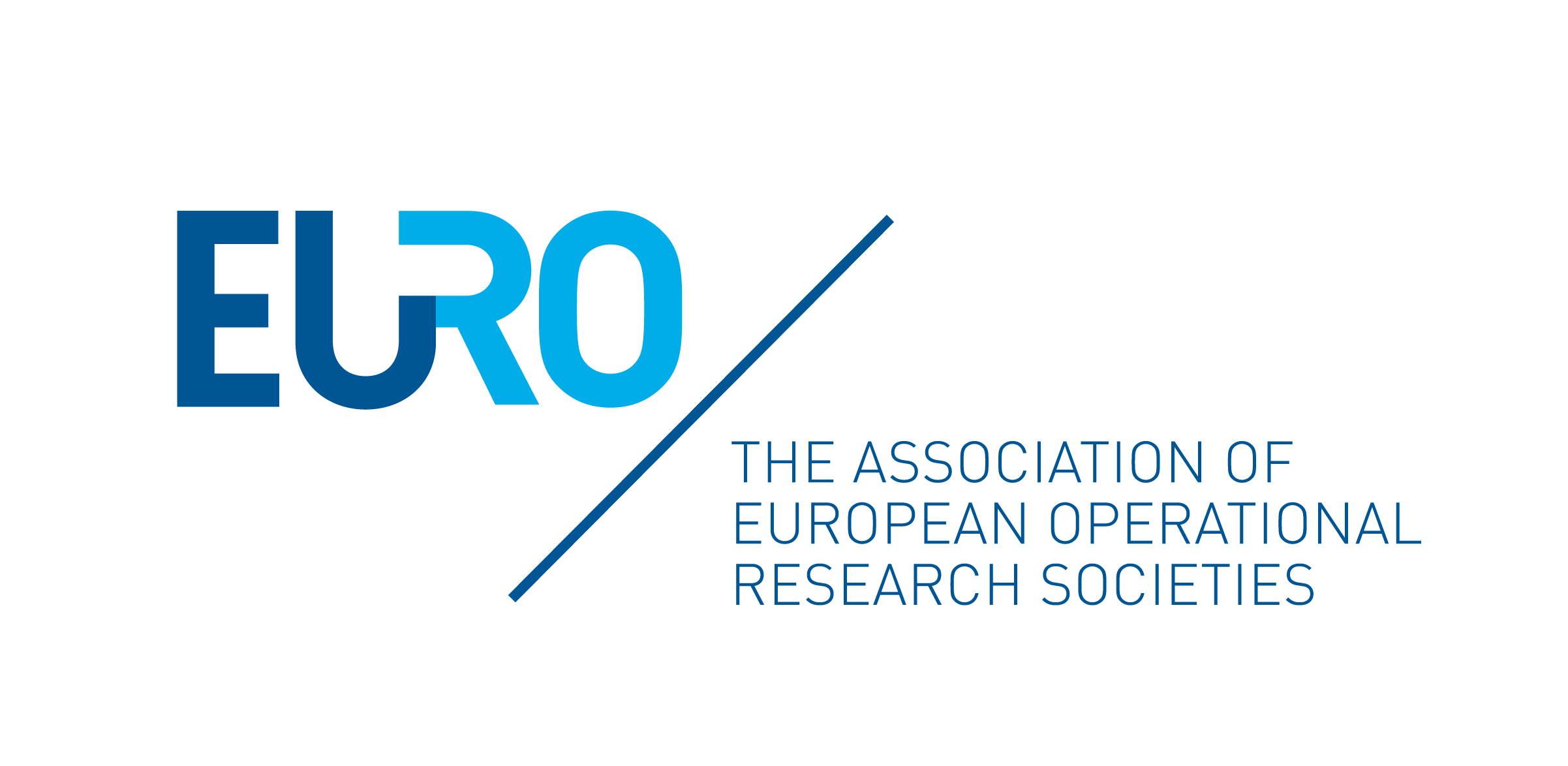
- Formation: 1975
- Type: Learned society
- Legal status: Not-for-Profit Association
- Purpose: To promote Operational Research throughout Europe
- Official language: English
- President: Frits Spieksma
- Parent organization: International Federation of Operational Research Societies (IFORS)
- Website: www.euro-online.org

The Association of European Operational Research Societies (EURO) is a regional grouping within the International Federation of Operational Research Societies (IFORS) whose aim is to promote Operational Research throughout Europe. It was established in 1975. The First European Conference on Operational Research (EURO I), was opened on the morning of 27 January 1975 at the Sheraton Hotel in Brussels.

== Overview ==
EURO is a nonprofit organization domiciled in Switzerland and is a member of Union of International Associations. EURO aims at the advancement of knowledge, interest and education in Operational Research by appropriate means, particularly by the exchange of information, the holding of meetings and conferences, the publication of books, papers, and journals, the awarding of prizes, and the promotion of early stage talents. The members of EURO are national Operational Research Societies which are full members of International Federation of Operational Research Societies (IFORS). Its affairs are regulated by a Council consisting of representatives of all its members and an executive committee which constitutes its board of directors. The EURO statutes were first signed on 18th June 1976.

The current EURO member societies are:

EURO Member Societies

- Austria
- Belarus
- Belgium
- Croatia
- Czech Republic
- Denmark
- Estonia
- Finland
- France
- Germany
- Greece
- Hungary
- Iceland
- Ireland
- Israel
- Italy
- Lithuania
- Netherlands
- Norway
- Poland
- Portugal
- Serbia
- Slovakia
- Slovenia
- South Africa
- Spain
- Sweden
- Switzerland
- Turkey
- Tunisia
- United Kingdom

== Activities ==
EURO publishes scholarly journals and books about operational research, and organizes international conferences. It also bestows Awards, supports working groups, and organizes educational meetings.

=== Publications ===
EURO publishes 4 scholarly journals:

- European Journal of Operational Research
- EURO Journal on Computational Optimization
- EURO Journal on Decision Processes
- EURO Journal on Transportation and Logistics

and the book series EURO Advanced Tutorials in Operational Research.

=== Awards ===
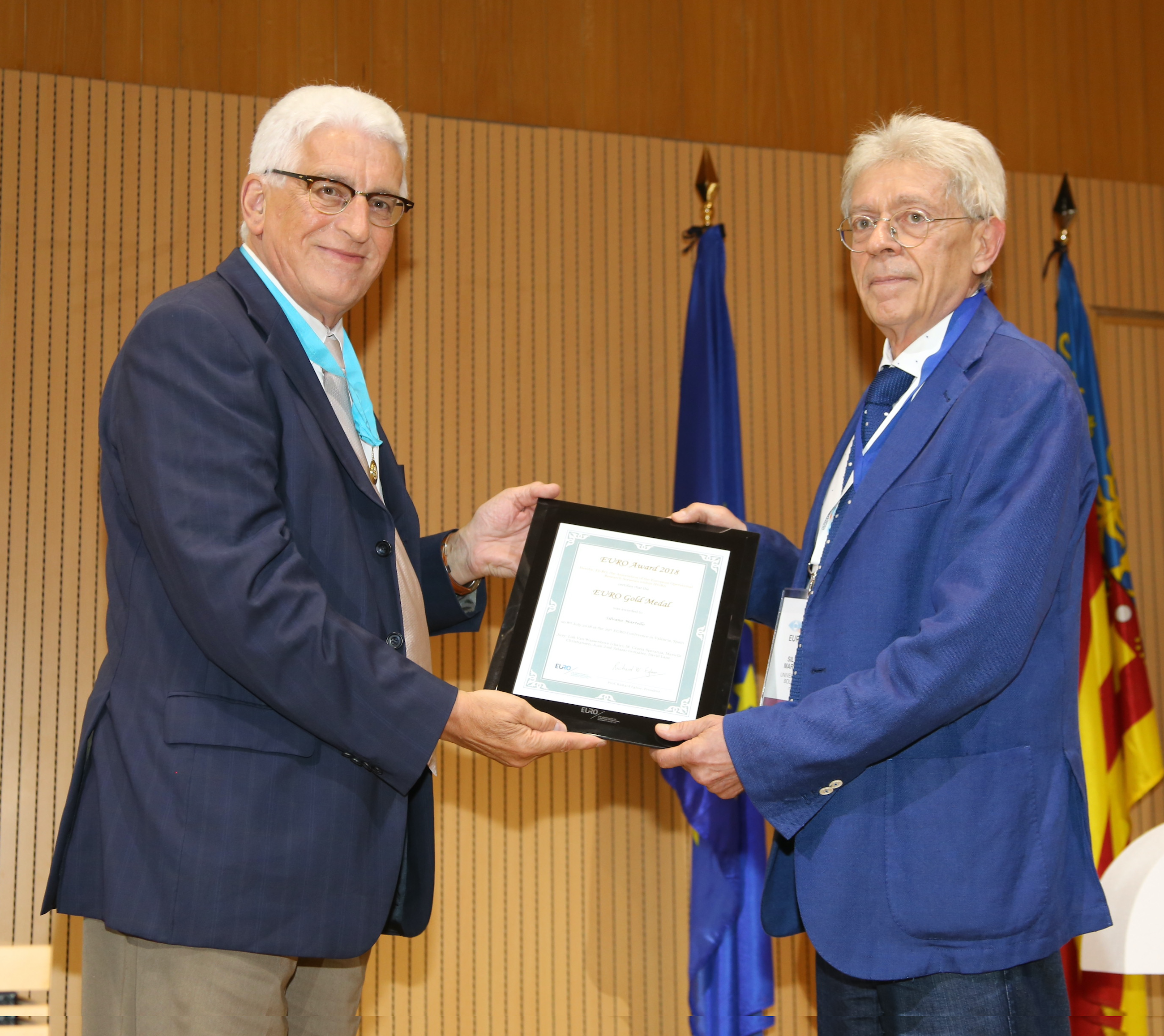
Silvano Martello (right) receives the EURO Gold Medal Award from Luk Van Wassenhove (left).

EURO bestows a number of prizes:

- EURO Gold Medal. The highest distinction within OR in Europe is conferred for an outstanding contribution to the OR science.
- Distinguished Service Award, a recognition of distinguished service to EURO, the Association of European Operational Research Societies and to the profession of OR.
- Excellence in Practice Award, to recognize outstanding accomplishments in the practice of OR.
- Doctoral Dissertation Award, to recognize the OR contributions of PhD students or scientists having less than two years research experience since completing a PhD.
- Prize for OR for the Common Good, to honour outstanding accomplishments of OR for solving social-oriented problems.
- EURO Award for the Best EJOR Papers, to recognize the best papers published in the European Journal of Operational Research.

=== Conferences and Meetings ===
EURO organizes a number of different conferences and events throughout each year:

- The EURO-k Conferences are broadly oriented and take place yearly, with the exception of the years when there is an IFORS triennial conference. They are hosted by EURO member societies.
- EURO Mini Conferences have the objective of assembling a limited number of specialists around a specific theme.
- EWG and FORUM Meetings are organized by each EURO Working Group and EURO Forums.
- The EURO Online Seminar Series enhances the dissemination of OR and relevant topics through online channels.

=== Working Groups and Forums ===
EURO Working Groups are the organizational framework provided by EURO to groups of researchers and practitioners interested in a specific operational research topic. Each EURO Working Group holds at least one meeting per year, organizes sessions at conferences, publishes special issues of OR journals, and organizes conferences or seminars.

Currently, EURO hosts 34 EWGs, with the most recent one launched in 2025: (EWGBAI), the EURO Working Group on Business Analytics and Artificial Intelligence (EWGBAI).

The full list of all active EURO Working Groups:

- EURO working group on Agriculture and Forest Management EWG-AFM,
- EURO working group on Automated Timetabling PATAT,
- EURO working group on Behavioural OR BOR,
- EURO working group on Business Analytics and Artificial Intelligence Interfaces EWGBAI,
- EURO working group on Combinatorial Optimization ECCO,
- EURO working group on Commodities and Financial Modelling CFM,
- EURO working group on Computational Biology, Bioinformatics and Medicine EWG-CBBM,
- EURO working group on Continuous Optimization EUROPT,
- EURO working group on Cutting and Packing ESICUP,
- EURO working group on Data Science meets Optimization EWG-DSO,
- EURO working group on Decision Support Systems EWG-DSS,
- EURO working group on Efficiency and Productivity Analysis EWG-EPA,
- EURO working group on Ethics and OR EWG-EOR,
- EURO working group on Experimental Economics E-CUBE,
- EURO working group on Health Services ORAHS,
- EURO working group on Humanitarian Operations HOpe,
- EURO Working Group on Locational Analysis EWGLA,
- EURO working group on Lot Sizing EWG-LS,
- EURO working group on Metaheuristics EU/ME,
- EURO working group on Multiple Criteria Decision Aiding EWG-MCDA,
- EURO working group on Network Optimization ENOG,
- EURO working group on Operations Research for Development EWG-ORD,
- EURO working group on OR in Sports EWG-ORS,
- EURO working group on Preference Handling EWG-PH,
- EURO working group on Pricing and Revenue Management EWG-PRM,
- EURO working group on Project Management and Scheduling EWG-PMS,
- EURO working group on Quantum OR EWG-QOR,
- EURO working group on Retail Operations EWG-RO,
- EURO working group on Stochastic Modelling STOCHMOD,
- EURO working group on Stochastic Optimization EWG-SO,
- EURO working group on Sustainable Development and Civil Engineering ORSDCE,
- EURO working group on Sustainable Supply Chains EWG-SSC,
- EURO working group on Transportation EWG-T,
- EURO working group on Vehicle Routing and Logistics VeRoLog,

EURO Forums are groups tasked with progressing a specific initiative that supports the ongoing health and vitality of OR research and practice. A EURO Forum differentiates itself from a EURO Working Group by promoting the health and vitality of OR without tying itself to a specific research domain or methodology. EURO has four forums:

- WISDOM (Women In Society: Doing Operational Research and Management Science)
- EUROYoung
- EURO Practitioners' Forum
- OR Education Forum

=== Education ===
EURO organizes educational meetings throughout each year:

- EURO PhD Schools are an instrument to encourage the organization of post-graduate education initiatives for PhD students under a school format.
- EURO Summer/Winter Institutes provide an opportunity for around 25 early stage researchers to meet for about two weeks. Participants present their material, discuss it with others and with a handful of specially invited senior experts in the field, and finally prepare a paper to be considered for inclusion in a feature issue of an OR publication.

=== Past Presidents ===
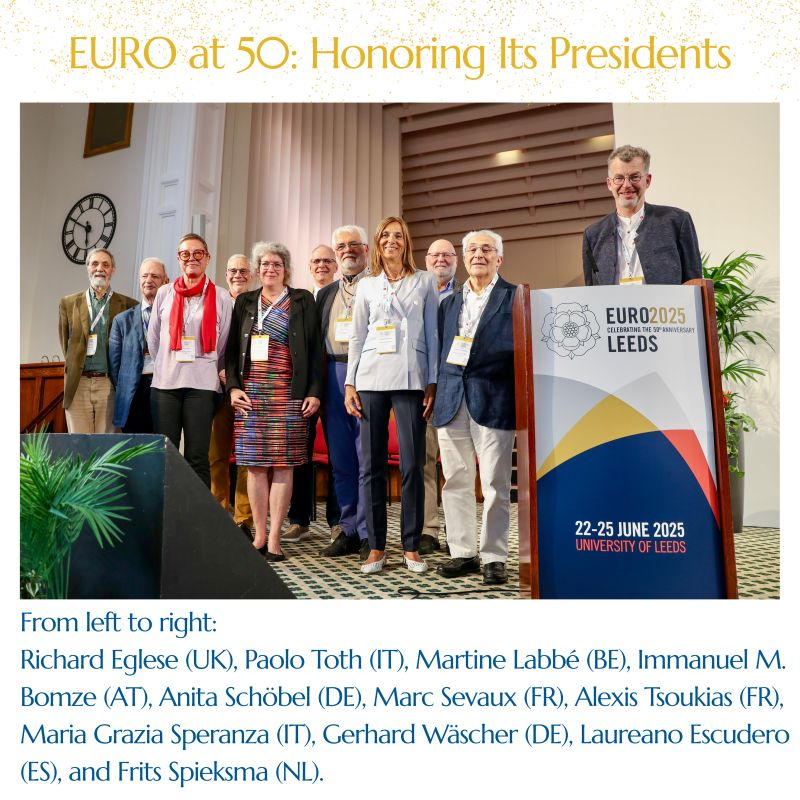
EURO Presidents (photo taken 2025)

- 1975-1978 - Hans-Jürgen Zimmermann
- 1979-1980 - Birger Rapp
- 1981-1982 - Rolfe Tomlinson
- 1983-1984 - Jean-Pierre Brans
- 1985-1986 - Bernard Roy
- 1987-1988 - Dominique de Werra
- 1989-1990 - Jakob Krarup
- 1991-1992 - Jaap Spronk
- 1993-1994 - Maurice Shutler
- 1995-1996 - Paolo Toth
- 1997-1998 - Jan Węglarz
- 1999-2000 - Christoph Schneeweiß
- 2001-2002 - Philippe Vincke
- 2003-2004 - Laureano Escudero
- 2005-2006 - Alexis Tsoukiàs
- 2007-2008 - Martine Labbé
- 2009-2010 - Valerie Belton
- 2011-2012 - M. Grazia Speranza
- 2013-2014 - Gerhard Wäscher
- 2015-2016 - Elena Fernández
- 2017-2018 - Richard Eglese
- 2019-2020 - Immanuel Bomze
- 2021-2022 - Marc Sevaux
- 2023-2024 - Anita Schöbel
- 2025-2026 - Frits Spieksma
- 2027-2028 - Dolores Romero Morales
