= VeRoLog =

European working group

VeRoLog, European Working Group on Vehicle Routing and Logistics Optimization
- Formation: 2011
- Legal status: Working group
- Purpose: To promote research and favor contact with industry on routing optimization
- Region served: Europe
- Parent organization: Association of European Operational Research Societies
- Website: www.euro-online.org/websites/verolog/

The European Working Group on Vehicle Routing and Logistics Optimization (also, EWG VeRoLog, or simply VeRoLog) is a working group within EURO, the Association of European Operational Research Societies whose objective is to promote the application of operations research models, methods and tools to the field of vehicle routing and logistics, and to encourage the exchange of information among practitioners, end-users, and researchers, stimulating the work on new and important problems with sound scientific methods.

== History ==
VeRoLog is one of the working groups of EURO, the Association of European Operational Research Societies. The Group was founded in 2011 by Daniele Vigo, Marielle Christiansen, Angel Corberan, Wout Dullaert, Richard Eglese, Geir Hasle, Stefan Irnich, Frederic Semet and Maria Grazia Speranza.

== Governance ==
The group is managed by a Coordinator and an Advisory Board including the founding members. The current coordinator is Daniele Vigo.

== Membership ==
The group is suitable for people who are presently engaged in Vehicle Routing and Logistics, either in theoretical aspects or in business, industry or public administration applications. Currently (2015), the group has about 1,500 members from 67 countries.

== Conferences ==
VeRoLog holds conferences on a regular basis (once a year during Summer) and issues every year an award to the best doctoral dissertation on vehicle routing and logistics optimization.

== Publications ==
In most cases, the annual conference is followed by a peer reviewed special issue of an international journal, presenting a selection of the contributions presented at the meeting. Recent special issues appeared on European Journal of Operational Research, and Computers and Operations Research.

A newsletter is emailed to all members every month.
