= Immanuel Bomze =

Austrian mathematician

Immanuel Bomze is an Austrian mathematician. In his doctoral thesis, he completely classified all (more than 100 topologically different) possible flows of the generalized Lotka–Volterra dynamics (generalized Lotka–Volterra equation) on the plane, employing equivalence of this dynamics to the 3-type replicator equation.

In “Non-cooperative two-person games in biology: a classification” (1986) and his book jointly authored with B. M. Pötscher (Game theoretic foundations of evolutionary stability, Springer 1989), he popularized the field of evolutionary game theory which at that time received most attention within Theoretical Biology, among researchers in Economics and Social Sciences.

Around the turn of the millennium, he coined, together with his co-authors, the now widely used terms "Standard Quadratic Optimization" and "Copositive Optimization" or "Copositive Programming". While the further deals with the simplest problem class in non-linear optimization with an NP-hard complexity, copositive optimization allows a conic reformulation of these hard problems as a linear optimization problem over a closed convex cone of symmetric matrices, a so-called conic optimization problem. In this type of problems, the full extent of complexity is put into the cone constraint, while structural constraints and also the objective function are linear and therefore easy to handle.

== Research interests ==
Bomze's research interests are in the areas of nonlinear optimization, qualitative theory of dynamical systems, game theory, mathematical modeling and statistics, where he has edited one and published four books, as well as over 100 peer-reviewed articles in scientific journals and monographs. The list of his coauthors comprises over seventy scientists from more than a dozen countries in four continents.

== Education and professional career ==
Bomze was born in Vienna, Austria, in 1958. He received the degree Magister rerum naturalium in Mathematics at the University of Vienna in 1981. After a postgraduate scholarship at the Institute for Advanced Studies, Vienna from 1981 to 1982, he received the degree Doctor rerum naturalium in Mathematics at the University of Vienna. He held several visiting research positions at various research institutions across Europe, the Americas, Asia and Australia. Since 2004, he holds a chair (full professor) of Applied Mathematics and Statistics at the University of Vienna. In 2014, he was elected EUROPT fellow. EUROPT is the Continuous Optimization Working Group of EURO.

== Professional activities ==
Bomze is currently past president of EURO, serving on the executive committee 2018 to 2021, and as president in 2019 and 2020. As a member of program and/or organizing committees, he co-organized various scientific events. He is an associate editor for five international journals. For several science foundations and councils (based in Germany, Great Britain, Hong Kong, Israel, Italy, the Netherlands, Portugal, Spain, US), and for over 50 scientific journals he acted as a reporting referee. Between 2011 and 2017 he served as an editor of the European Journal of Operational Research, one of the worldwide leading journals in the field. He is currently editor-in-chief of the EURO Journal on Computational Optimization.
