= Société française de Recherche Opérationnelle et Aide à la Décision =

Professional non-profit society in France

ROADEF, French Operations Research & Decision Support Society
- Formation: 1998
- Legal status: Society
- Purpose: To promote operations research
- Region served: France
- Parent organization: Association of European Operational Research Societies International Federation of Operational Research Societies
- Website: www.roadef.org

The French Operations Research & Decision Support Society (in French: Société française de Recherche Opérationnelle et d’Aide à la Décision - ROADEF) is a professional non-profit society that aims to promote the scientific field of Operations Research (OR) and Decision Support (DS) in France. The society is a member of the European umbrella organization, the Association of European Operational Research Societies (EURO), and of the International Federation of Operational Research Societies (IFORS).

== History ==
The society was created in 1998. Its mission is to encourage the development of operational research and decision support in France, to disseminate OR/DS knowledge and practices in industry, and to promote their teaching in education.

Founding members of ROADEF included Denis Bouyssou, Jacques Carlier, Philippe Chrétienne, Stéphane Dauzère-Pérès, Dominique Fortin, Xavier Gandibleux, Nelson Maculan Filho, Ali Ridha Mahjoub, Gérard Plateau, Jean-Charles Pomerol, Marie-Claude Portmann, Christian Proust, Catherine Roucairol, Bernard Roy, as well as some OR/DS research laboratories - LAMIH (Université de Valenciennes et du Hainaut-Cambrésis), Lamsade (Université Paris-Dauphine) - and some companies practicing OR/DS - Bouygues, Eurodecision, Gaz de France, SNCF.

== Governance ==
The ROADEF society is managed by a board composed of six officers elected by the members, including the President, a secretary, a treasurer, three vice presidents, plus a special officer in charge of OR promotion and of industrial relations.

The current president of ROADEF is Sandra Ulrich N'Gueveu. Previous presidents included François Clautiaux, Aziz Moukrim, Sourour Elloumi, Frédéric Gardi, Nadia Brauner, Francis Sourd, Olivier Hudry, Jean-Charles Billaut, Marie-Christine Costa, Arnaud Fréville, Denis Bouyssou, Marie-Claude Portmann.

== Membership ==
Currently (2016), the ROADEF society has more than 500 members - individuals and institutions from academia, industry and administration.

== Publications ==
Jointly with the Belgian Society for Operations Research and the Italian Operations Research Society, ROADEF publishes 4OR - A Quarterly Journal of Operations Research. The publisher firm is Springer. Every 6 months, a printed/online bulletin, Bulletin de la ROADEF, is sent to the members. It includes news, interviews and short presentations of research areas in OR/DS by scientific experts. In addition ROADEF holds the scientific responsibility of the journal RAIRO - Operations Research.

== Conferences ==
Once a year, ROADEF organizes a national conference, attended by about 400 participants (2017). ROADEF also organizes on a regular basis some industrial events to favor exchanges between academics and professionals.

== Challenge ==
Every second year, a challenge is proposed to the OR community. International research teams compete to solve at best a real-world optimization problem provided by a business company. Latest problems were proposed by Air Liquide, SNCF, Google, EDF. The winner of the competition is revealed during the EURO conference.

== Awards ==
- The Robert Faure Prize awards an original contribution to the field of Operations Research and Decision Sciences with both theoretical aspects and applications. This prize is given every three years by a jury composed of academics and practitioners.

Last winners included Giacomo Nannicini, Frédéric Gardi, Jérôme Malick, Walid Ben Ameur, Francis Sourd, Philippe Baptiste, Chengbin Chu, Eric Pinson, and Philippe Solot.

- The Jeune Chercheur Prize awards a young researcher (who has recently received her/his PhD or is still in thesis) for her/his contribution in Operations Research and Decision Sciences. The prize is awarded each year by a scientific jury during the ROADEF conference.
