= EURO Journal on Decision Processes =

- Discipline: Operational Research
- Language: English
- Edited by: Jutta Geldermann

Publication details
- History: 2012–present
- Publisher: Elsevier on behalf of the Association of European Operational Research Societies

Standard abbreviations
- ISO 4: EURO J. Decis. Process.

Indexing
- ISSN: 2193-9438 (print); 2193-9446 (web)

Links
- Journal homepage

The EURO Journal on Decision Processes (EJDP) is a peer-reviewed academic journal that was established in 2012 and originally published by Springer Science+Business Media. In 2021, the journal will instead be published by Elsevier.

It is an official journal of the Association of European Operational Research Societies, publishing scientific knowledge on the theoretical, methodological, behavioural and organizational topics that contribute to the understanding and appropriate use of operational research in supporting different phases of decision-making processes.

The editor-in-chief is

- Jutta Geldermann

Past Editor-in-Chief:

- Vincent Mousseau (2016 - 2021)
- Ahti Salo (2012-2016).
