= Elena Fernández =

Spanish operations researcher

- Born: July 4, 1956 (age 69)
- Occupation: Operations Researcher

Elena Fernández Aréizaga (born July 4, 1956) is a Spanish operations researcher, the former president of the Association of European Operational Research Societies. Topics in her research include facility location, network design, the vehicle routing problem, and heuristic methods for mathematical optimization. She is a professor of statistics and operations research at the University of Cádiz.

== Education and career ==
Fernández earned degrees in mathematics from the University of Zaragoza in 1979 and the University of Valencia in 1985. She completed a Ph.D. in computer science in 1988 at the Polytechnic University of Catalonia. Her doctoral dissertation, Diseño y estudio computacional de algotimos híbridos para problemas de set partitioning, concerned optimization problems for set partitions and was supervised by Jaume Barceló.

She held a faculty position as a lecturer (prof. colaboradora) at the University of the Basque Country from 1983 to 1984, when she moved to the Polytechnic University of Catalonia. She joined the department of computer science there in 1987, moved to the department of statistics and operations research as an associate professor (prof. titular) in 1989, and became a full professor (catedrática universidad) in 2007. She moved to Cádiz in 2019.

== Service ==
Fernández was president of the Association of European Operational Research Societies (EURO) for the 2015–2016 term. She headed the committee for women and mathematics of the Royal Spanish Mathematical Society (RSME) from 2009 to 2012, and in 2020 she became head of the science committee of the RSME.
