= EU/ME, the metaheuristics community =

EWG EU/ME, EURO Working Group on Metaheuristics
- Formation: 2000
- Legal status: Working group
- Purpose: A platform to share information on optimization using metaheuristics
- Region served: Europe
- Parent organization: Association of European Operational Research Societies
- Website: www.metaheuristics.eu

EWG EU/ME, the EURO Working Group on Metaheuristics, formerly referred to as EU/ME – the metaheuristics community, is a working group the main purpose of which is to provide a platform for communication among researchers in the field of metaheuristic optimization, practitioners interested in applying metaheuristic optimization techniques in practice, developers of optimization software, and the general public.

EU/ME is a EURO Working Group, officially sanctioned and financially supported by EURO, the Association of European Operational Research Societies.

== History ==
The Group was founded (under the name EU/ME – EUropean chapter on MEtaheuristics) in 2000 by Marc Sevaux, Kenneth Sörensen and Christelle Wynants, following the 2000 EURO Winter Institute on metaheuristics for combinatorial optimization held in Lac Noir, Switzerland. In 2001, the group received its status as official EURO working group. In that same year, the EU/ME website (the main tool for communication among EU/ME members) was created.

In 2010, the name was changed to EU/ME – the metaheuristics community. The name was changed again (to EWG EU/ME – EURO Working Group on Metaheuristics) in 2015 following a decision of EURO to harmonize the names of its working groups.

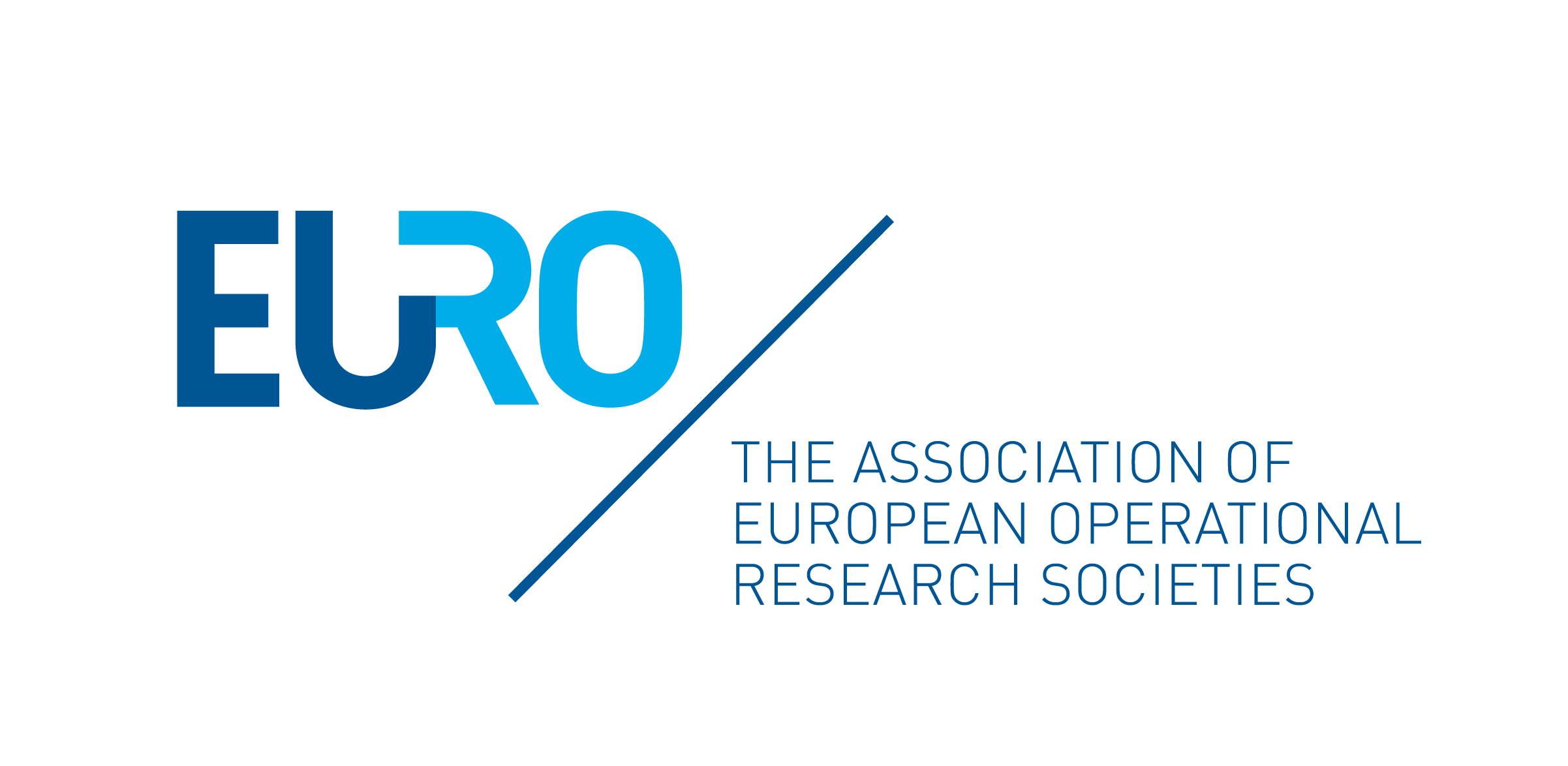
EURO, the umbrella association to which EURO belongs

The number of EU/ME members has been steadily increasing, from about 500 in 2001, and 1000 in 2004 to about 1860 now.

In 2014, a special section on Variable Neighborhood Search was created.

== Governance ==
The group is managed by 3 Coordinators and an advisory board of 3 members. The current coordinators are Andreas Reinholz, Marc Sevaux and Kenneth Sörensen.

The special section on Variable Neighborhood Search has its own board (currently Abraham Duarte and Nenad Mladenovic).

== Membership ==
Membership of EU/ME is free and open to anyone interested in metaheuristic optimization, either in the development of metaheuristics or in the use of metaheuristics to solve optimization problems. Membership of EU/ME consists largely of academic researchers, but the group has a limited number of industrial members from companies such as IBM, Thales Group, France Telecom, and Bombardier Inc.

Currently (2016), the group has about 1,865 members from 85 countries. Members of EU/ME include many notable authorities in the field of metaheuristics, such as Fred W. Glover (a supporting member since 2000), and many others. In terms of membership, EU/ME is the largest platform for researchers on metaheuristics and also the largest EURO working group. Many researchers in the group are active in the field of multi-objective optimization.

== Conferences ==
EU/ME holds conferences on a yearly basis on a specific topic. The conferences are always co-organized with a local research group. Past conferences are:

EU/MEeting 2001 with UK Local Search Group (London, UK)

EU/MEeting 2002 on Multi-Objective Metaheuristics (Paris, France)

EU/MEeting 2003 on Real-Life Applications of Metaheuristics (Antwerp, Belgium)

EU/MEeting 2004 on Design and Evaluation of Advanced Hybrid Meta-Heuristics (Nottingham, UK)

EU/MEeting 2005 on Metaheuristics and Large Scale Optimization (Vilnius Lithuania)

EU/MEeting 2006 on Combination of Metaheuristics and LS with Constraint Programming techniques (Nantes, France)

EU/MEeting 2006 on Adaptive, Self-adaptive and Multi-level Metaheuristics (Málaga, Spain)

EU/MEeting 2007 on Applications of Metaheuristics in the Service Industry (Stuttgart, Germany) Proceedings from this meeting can be found here.

EU/MEeting 2008 on Metaheuristics in Logistics and Routing, in Troyes, France.

EU/MEeting 2009 "Discussing the future" in Porto, Portugal.

EU/MEeting 2010 on the 10th anniversary of the metaheuristic community, in Lorient, France.

EU/MEeting 2011 "Client-centered Logistics and International Aid", Vienna, Austria.

EU/MEeting 2012 "Metaheuristics for global challenges", Copenhagen, Denmark.

EU/MEeting 2013 "Metaheuristics for all", Hamburg, Germany.

EU/MEeting 2014 "Metaheuristics and Engineering", Istanbul, Turkey.

EU/MEeting 2015 "Metaheuristics Applications", Madrid, Spain.

EU/MEeting 2016 "Design and Analysis of Metaheuristics", Antwerp, Belgium.

Additionally, the Variable Neighborhood Search conference series is now also organized under EU/ME flag (by the EU/ME section on Variable Neighborhood Search).

== Publications ==
The group has no newsletter but instead use a linkedIn group to distribute information to members.

Several books and special issues of academic journals have been published containing results of EU/MEetings.

== Pronunciation ==
EU/ME is pronounced [uːmɪə] or [uː ænd mɪə] (Help:IPA/English).
