= Yasemin Arda =

Turkish-Belgian management scientist and operations researcher

Yasemin Arda (born 1978) is a Turkish-Belgian management scientist and operations researcher specializing in supply chain management. She is a professor in the management school of the University of Liège, vice-dean for education in the school, and the president for the 2021–2022 term of the Belgian Society for Operations Research.

Arda graduated from Istanbul Technical University in 1999, with a bachelor's degree in engineering, earned a master's degree in industrial engineering in 2001 at Boğaziçi University, and earned a second master's degree in industrial systems in 2003 at Paul Sabatier University in France, before completing her Ph.D. in 2008 at the Institut national des sciences appliquées de Toulouse in France, under the direction of Jean-Claude Hennet.
