= EURO Advanced Tutorials in Operational Research =

- Edited by: M. Grazia Speranza and José Fernando Oliveira
- Discipline: Operational Research
- Publisher: Springer Science+Business Media on behalf of the Association of European Operational Research Societies
- Published: = 2014-present
- Website: http://www.springer.com/series/13840

The EURO Advanced Tutorials in Operational Research are a series of short books devoted to advanced topics in Operational Research that are not available in textbooks. The scope of a Tutorial is to provide more detail about advanced topics in a relevant field to researchers and practitioners. The Book Series was established in 2014 and is published by Springer Science+Business Media. It is an official publication of the Association of European Operational Research Societies.

- Renata Mansini, Włodzimierz Ogryczak, M. Grazia Speranza - Linear and Mixed Integer Programming for Portfolio Optimization
- Alves, C., Clautiaux, F., de Carvalho, J.V., Rietz, J. - Dual-Feasible Functions for Integer Programming and Combinatorial Optimization
- Henggeler Antunes, Carlos, João Alves, Maria, Clímaco, João - Multiobjective Linear and Integer Programming
- Lancia, Giuseppe, Serafini, Paolo - Compact Extended Linear Programming Models
- Duarte, Abraham, Laguna, Manuel, Marti, Rafael - Metaheuristics for Business Analytics
- Zhao, Lima, Huchzermeier, Arnd - Supply Chain Finance
- van Wageningen-Kessels, Femke - Traffic Flow Modelling
- Doumpos, M., Lemonakis, C., Niklis, D., Zopounidis, C. - Analytical Techniques in the Assessment of Credit Risk
- Bigi, G., Castellani, M., Pappalardo, M., Passacantando, M. - Nonlinear Programming Techniques for Equilibria
- Vansteenwegen, Pieter, Gunawan, Aldy - Orienteering Problems: Models and Algorithms for Vehicle Routing Problems with Profits
- Fajardo, M.D., Goberna, M.A., Rodríguez, M.M.L., Vicente-Pérez, J. - Even Convexity and Optimization
- Menoncin, Francesco - Risk Management for Pension Funds
- Brandimarte, Paolo - From Shortest Paths to Reinforcement Learning
- Maniezzo, Vittorio, Boschetti, Marco Antonio, Stützle, Thomas - Matheuristics
- Anjos, Miguel F., Vieira, Manuel V.C. - Facility layout. Mathematical optimization techniques and engineering (Review)
- Celso C. Ribeiro, Sebastian Urrutia, Dominique de Werra - Combinatorial Models for Scheduling Sports Tournaments

The editors are

- M. Grazia Speranza
- Kenneth Sörensen

The past editors are

- José Fernando Oliveira (2014–2023)
