= Begoña Vitoriano =

Spanish operations researcher

Begoña Vitoriano Villanueva (born 1967) is a Spanish applied mathematician and operations researcher whose work concerns the logistics of humanitarian aid and disaster relief. She is an associate professor in the Department of Statistics and Operational Research at the Complutense University of Madrid, and the president of the Spanish Statistics and Operations Research Society.

== Education and career ==
Vitoriano, who is Spanish, was born in 1967. She studied mathematics and operations research at the Complutense University of Madrid. Despite difficulties caused by the death of her father in the first year of her studies, the need to support herself through private tutoring, and the birth of two children during her studies, she earned a bachelor's degree there in 1990 and completed her Ph.D. in 1994.

She became an assistant professor in the Department of Statistics and Operational Research at the Complutense University of Madrid from 1990 to 1997. In 1995, when she traveled to El Salvador as part of an international collaboration to set up a master's program there, and witnessed the devastation and poverty caused in part by the recently ended Salvadoran Civil War. From 1997 to 2006 she worked as an assistant and then associate professor in the Department of Industrial Organisation and Institute for Technological Research at Comillas Pontifical University in Madrid, a private Jesuit school conflicting with her belief in public education, but with an emphasis on social justice that fit well with her research agenda. It was during this time that she changed her research focus from the management of electrical grids to disaster relief. She returned to Complutense University as an untenured associate professor in 2006, and was granted tenure in 2009.

In 2021, she was elected president of the Spanish Statistics and Operations Research Society for a three-year term, beginning in 2022.

== Selected publications ==
- Vitoriano, Begoña; Ortuño, M. Teresa; Tirado, Gregorio; Montero, Javier (2011), "A multi-criteria optimization model for humanitarian aid distribution", Journal of Global Optimization, 51 (2): 189–208, Bibcode:2011JGO....51..189V, doi:10.1007/s10898-010-9603-z, hdl:10138/158499, MR 2831951, S2CID 27827794
- Vitoriano, Begoña; Montero, Javier; Ruan, Da, eds. (2013), Decision Aid Models for Disaster Management and Emergencies, Atlantis Computational Intelligence Systems, vol. 7, Atlantis Press, doi:10.2991/978-94-91216-74-9, ISBN 978-94-91216-73-2, S2CID 11137079
- Liberatore, F.; Ortuño, M. T.; Tirado, G.; Vitoriano, B.; Scaparra, M. P. (2014), "A hierarchical compromise model for the joint optimization of recovery operations and distribution of emergency goods in Humanitarian Logistics", Computers & Operations Research, 42: 3–13, doi:10.1016/j.cor.2012.03.019, MR 3116287
- Ferrer, José M.; Martín-Campo, F. Javier; Ortuño, M. Teresa; Pedraza-Martínez, Alfonso J.; Tirado, Gregorio; Vitoriano, Begoña (September 2018), "Multi-criteria optimization for last mile distribution of disaster relief aid: Test cases and applications", European Journal of Operational Research, 269 (2): 501–515, doi:10.1016/j.ejor.2018.02.043, S2CID 19235699
