= EURO Journal on Computational Optimization =

- Discipline: Operational Research
- Language: English
- Edited by: Immanuel Bomze

Publication details
- History: 2012-present
- Publisher: Elsevier on behalf of the Association of European Operational Research Societies

Standard abbreviations
- ISO 4: EURO J. Comput. Optim.

Indexing
- ISSN: 2192-4406 (print); 2192-4414 (web)

Links
- Journal homepage

The EURO Journal on Computational Optimization (EJCO) is a peer-reviewed academic journal that was established in 2012 and is now published by Elsevier. It is an official journal of the Association of European Operational Research Societies, promoting the use of computers for the solution of optimization problems. Coverage includes both methodological contributions and innovative applications, typically validated through convincing computational experiments.

The editor-in-chief is

- Immanuel Bomze.

Past Editor-in-Chief:

- Martine Labbé (2012-2020).

== Abstracting and indexing ==
The journal is abstracted and indexed in the following databases:

- EBSCO Information Services
- Emerging Sources Citation Index
- Google Scholar
- International Abstracts in Operations Research
- Mathematical Reviews
- OCLC
- Research Papers in Economics
- Scopus
- Summon by ProQuest
- Zentralblatt Math
