= 4OR =

- Discipline: Operations Research, Decision Theory
- Language: English
- Edited by: Yves Crama, Michel Grabisch, Silvano Martello

Publication details
- History: 2003-present
- Publisher: Springer Science+Business Media
- Open access: Hybrid
- Impact factor: 1.763 (2021)

Standard abbreviations
- ISO 4: 4OR

Indexing
- ISSN: 1619-4500 (print); 1614-2411 (web)

Links
- Journal homepage; Online access

4OR - A Quarterly Journal of Operations Research is a peer-reviewed scientific journal that was established in 2003 and is published by Springer Science+Business Media. It is a joint official journal of the Belgian, French, and Italian Operations Research Societies. The journal publishes research papers and surveys on the theory and applications of Operations Research. The Editors-in-chief are Yves Crama (University of Liège), Michel Grabisch (Pantheon-Sorbonne University), and Silvano Martello (University of Bologna).

== Abstracting and indexing ==
The journal is abstracted and indexed in the following databases:

- DBLP
- EconLit
- EBSCO Information Services
- Google Scholar
- International Abstracts in Operations Research
- Journal Citation Reports
- Mathematical Reviews
- OCLC
- ProQuest
- Science Citation Index
- SCImago Journal Rank
- Scopus
- Zentralblatt Math

According to the Journal Citation Reports, the journal has a 2024 impact factor of 2.6.
