= András Prékopa =

Hungarian mathematician (1929-2016)

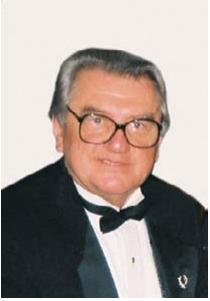
- Born: September 11, 1929; Nyíregyháza, Hungary
- Died: September 18, 2016 (aged 87); Budapest, Hungary
- Education: University of Debrecen
- Awards: Széchenyi Prize (1996)
- Scientific career
- Fields: Operations Research
- Workplaces: Rutgers University
- Doctoral advisor: Alfréd Rényi
- Doctoral students: Endre Boros
- Website: rutcor.rutgers.edu/Prekopa/index.html

András Prékopa (September 11, 1929 – September 18, 2016) was a Hungarian mathematician, a member of the Hungarian Academy of Sciences. He was one of the pioneers of stochastic programming and has been a major contributor to its literature. He amended one of the three basic model types of the discipline, chance-constrained programming, by taking into account stochastic dependence among the random variables involved. One of his main results in the area concerns the convexity theory of probabilistically constrained stochastic optimization problems. He introduced the concept of logarithmic concave measures and provided several fundamental theorems on logconcavity, which supplied proofs for the convexity of a wide class of probabilistically constrained stochastic programming problems. These results had impact far beyond the area of mathematical programming, as they found applications in physics, economics, statistics, convex geometry and other fields.

== Education ==
He received his university diploma as teacher of mathematics and physics from the University of Debrecen in 1952. In 1952, he became a Ph.D. student (aspirant) at the Institute for Applied Mathematics of the Hungarian Academy of Sciences (HAS) and defended his thesis, entitled "On Stochastic Set Functions", in 1956. His advisor was Alfréd Rényi.

== Academic career ==
Between 1956 and 1968 he was first assistant, later associate professor at the department of probability theory of the L. Eötvös University. In 1968, he became full professor at the department of mathematics of the Technical University of Budapest, where he remained until 1983. In that year he returned to the Eötvös University, and became the founder, professor and first chairman of the Department of Operations Research (OR). He retired from there in 2000. From 1985 until 2015, he was a distinguished professor of OR, statistics and mathematics at Rutgers University. He was also the graduate director of the Ph.D. program in OR. In 2015 he retired from Rutgers as a distinguished professor emeritus. Prékopa's part-time appointments were also important in his scientific career in Hungary. In 1958, he founded the first research department in OR at the Mathematics Institute of the HAS and in 1977 the department of applied mathematics at the Computing and Automation Institute of the HAS.

== Research and achievements ==
Prékopa is the father of the Hungarian Operations Research in many ways: he developed the research school and education curricula, organized international and local conferences, formed an academic committee, founded a scientific periodical, etc. He published more than a dozen books and about 350 papers alone and with co-authors and supervised 51 Ph.D. students, many of whom are internationally known academics and industrial leaders.

In 1979, Prékopa was elected a corresponding member and in 1985 full member of the Hungarian Academy of Sciences. He was also elected a foreign member of the National Academy of Engineering of Mexico, fellow of the Econometric Society, member of the International Statistical Institute and honorary president of the János Bolyai Mathematical Society and the Hungarian OR Society, among others.

== Awards ==
- INFORMS President's Award for "his significant and longstanding contributions to operations research in both basic theory and effective applications.
- Khachiyan Prize of the INFORMS Optimization Society, 2012, is awarded annually to an individual or a team for life-time achievements in the area of optimization.
- Commander's Cross of the Order of Merit of the Republic of Hungary, 2005.
- EURO Gold Medal, from the Association of European Operational Research Societies, 2003.
- Grand Prize of the Arany János Foundation (Hungary) for the creation of a scientific school, 2002.
- Prize for Excellence from the Publ. House of the H.A.S..1998, for the book 'Stochastic Programming, Kluwer, 1995.'
- Széchenyi Prize (1996), for outstanding scientific achievements.
- T. Szele medal from the János Bolyai Mathematical Society, 1994, for mentoring young scientists.
- Award from the Polish Academy of Sciences for outstanding scientific achievements and organization, 1982.
- Award from the Computer and Automation Inst. of the HAS, 1985, for outstanding scientific research.
- O. Benedikt award from the Computer and Automation Institute of the HAS, 1979, for outstanding research and leadership in Operations Research and Applied Mathematics.
- Award from the Federation of Scientific and Engineering Societies of Hungary, 1983, for outstanding activities in organization.
- G. Grünwald award from the J. Bolyai Society, 1956, given to young mathematicians for outstanding scientific achievements.

== Personal life ==
He was married to Kinga Széchenyi, educator, sculptor and writer; they had two children and two grandchildren. He was a member of the Batthyány Society of Professors.

== Selected publications ==
Prékopa is a prolific author of scientific works on various topics in operations research, probability and statistics. He along with his collaborators has published 20 books, several hundred scientific papers and 150 educational and popular scientific articles. His landmark monograph Stochastic Programming (Kluwer, 1995) describes many of his results, and provides a comprehensive presentation of the field of stochastic programming

=== Books, book parts – editorial activity ===
- A. Prékopa: Probability Theory, Műszaki Kiadó, Budapest, 440 pages. First edition 1962, second 1972, third 1974, fourth 1980 (in Hungarian).
- J. Bognár, J. Mogyoródi, A. Prékopa, A. Rényi and D. Szász: Probability Theory Problem Collection Textbook Publ. House, Budapest 1971, 330 pages. Second ed. 2001, Typotex, Budapest (in Hungarian).
- Prékopa, A., Linear Programming. J. Bolyai Mathematical Society, Budapest, 1968, 400 pages (in Hungarian).
- Prékopa, A. (editor), Colloquium on the Applications of Mathematics to Economics. Proceedings of the International Conference on the Applications of Mathematics to Economics, Budapest, Hungary, 1963. Publ. House of the H.A.S. Budapest, 1965.
- Prékopa, A. (editor), Inventory Control and Water Storage. Proceedings of the International Conference on Inventory Control and Water Storage, Györ, Hungary, 1971. Colloquia Mathematica Societatis János Bolyai 7, North Holland Publishing Company, 1973.
- Prékopa, A. (editor), Progress in Operations Research I., II. Proceedings of the International Conference on Operations Research, Eger, Hungary, 1974. Colloquia Mathematica Societatis János Bolyai 12, North Holland Publishing Company, 1976.
- Prékopa, A. (editor), Survey of Mathematical Programming I., II., III. Proceedings of the IX International Symposium on Mathematical Programming, Budapest, Hungary, 1976. North Holland Publishing Company, 1979.
- Prékopa, A. (editor), Studies on Mathematical Programming. Proceedings of the IV Conference on Mathematical Programming, Mátrafüred, Hungary, 1975. Mathematical Methods of Operations Research, Vol. 1., Publ. House of the H.A.S., Budapest, 1980.
- Prékopa, A. and J-B. Wets (editors), Stochastic Programming I. II. Mathematical Programming Study 27, 28, 1986.

=== Papers ===
- A. Prékopa: On a Problem in Probability Theory. In: Proceedings of the First Hungarian Mathematical Congress, Akadémiai Kiadó, Budapest, 1950 (in Hungarian and in French).
- A. Prékopa: On Composed Poisson Distributions IV. Acta Math. Acad. Sci. Hung., 3(1952), 317–325.
- A. Prékopa: Mathematical Treatment of the Degradation Process of Long Chain Molecules, Publications of the Mathematical Institute of the H.A.S., 2(1953), 103–123 (in Hungarian).
- A. Prékopa: On the convergence of series of independent random variables, Publicationes Mathematicae, 4(1956), 410–417.
- A. Prékopa: Extension of multiplicative set functions with values in a Banach algebra, Acta Math. Acad. Sci. Hung., 7(1956), 201–213.
- Prékopa, A., A. Rényi and K. Urbanik, On the Limiting Distribution of Sums of Independent Random Variables with Values in Compact Topological Groups. Acta Math. Acad. Sci. Hung. 7 (1956), 11–16. (in Russian).
- Prékopa, A. and A. Rényi, On the Independence in the Limit of Sums Depending on the Same Sequence of Independent Random Variables. Acta Math. Acad. Sci. Hung. 7 (1956), 319–326.
- Prékopa, A., On Stochastic Set Functions I. Acta Math. Acad. Sci. Hung. 7 (1956), 215–263.
- Prékopa, A., On Stochastic Set Functions II. Acta Math. Acad. Sci. Hung. 8 (1957), 337–374.
- Prékopa, A., On Stochastic Set Functions III. Acta Math. Acad. Sci. Hung. 8 (1957), 375–400.
- A. Prékopa: On the Compound Poisson Distribution, Acta Scientiarum Mathematicarum, 18(1957), 23–28.
- Prékopa, A., On Additive and Multiplicative Totals. Acta Math. Acad. Sci. Hung. 8 (1957), 107–126

== See also ==
- Prékopa–Leindler inequality
