= Pilar Ibarrola =

Spanish statistician

María del Pilar Ibarrola Muñoz (born 1944) is a Spanish statistician and stochastic control theorist, part of the early expansion of statistics into an academic discipline in Spain in the 1960s and 1970s. She was named professor of decision theory at Complutense University of Madrid in 1974, but soon after left for the University of La Laguna, where she was named as University Professor. She returned to the professorship of decision theory at Complutense University in 1979.

Ibarrola served as the third president of the Spanish Statistics and Operations Research Society (SEIO), from 1984 to 1986. She received the SEIO Medal in 2013.
