= EURO Journal on Transportation and Logistics =

- Discipline: Operational Research
- Language: English
- Edited by: Daniele Vigo

Publication details
- History: 2011-present
- Publisher: Elsevier on behalf of the Association of European Operational Research Societies

Standard abbreviations
- ISO 4: EURO J. Transp. Logist.

Indexing
- ISSN: 2192-4376

Links
- Journal homepage

The EURO Journal on Transportation and Logistics (EJTL) is a peer-reviewed academic journal in operations research that was established in 2011 and is now published by Elsevier. It is an official journal of the Association of European Operational Research Societies, promoting the use of mathematics in general, and operations research in particular, in the context of transportation and logistics.

The editor-in-chief is

- Daniele Vigo

Past Editor-in-Chief:

- Dominique Feillet (2020-2015)
- Michel Bierlaire (2011-2019)

== Abstracting and indexing ==
The journal is abstracted and indexed in the following databases:

- EBSCO Information Services
- Emerging Sources Citation Index
- Google Scholar
- International Abstracts in Operations Research
- OCLC
- Research Papers in Economics
- Scopus
- Summon by ProQuest
- Transportation Research International Documentation (TRID) of Transportation Research Board
