= Martine Labbé =

Belgian operations researcher

Martine Labbé (born 5 January 1958) is a Belgian operations researcher known for her work on mathematical optimization, facility location, and road pricing. She is an honorary professor of graphs and mathematical optimization in the department of computer science at the Université libre de Bruxelles, editor-in-chief of the EURO Journal on Computational Optimization, and a former president of the Association of European Operational Research Societies (EURO).

== Education and career ==
Labbé is originally from Brussels. She was educated at the Université libre de Bruxelles, earning a bachelor's degree in 1978, a master's degree in 1981, and a Ph.D. in 1985. Her dissertation, Essays in Network Location Theory, was supervised by Simone Huyberechts.

After a visiting position at Louis Pasteur University she became an assistant professor at Erasmus University Rotterdam in 1988. She returned to the Université libre de Bruxelles as a researcher for the National Fund for Scientific Research in 1992, became a faculty member in the Institute for Statistics and Operational Research (ISRO) in 1995, and was promoted to full professor in 2000. She was president of ISRO for 2003–2004, dean of sciences at the Université libre de Bruxelles for 2007–2011, and president of the Association of European Operational Research Societies for 2007–2008. She retired to become an honorary professor in 2019.

She is editor-in-chief of the EURO Journal on Computational Optimization, a position she has held since 2011.

== Recognition ==
Labbé was the 2019 winner of the EURO Gold Medal of the Association of European Operational Research Societies.
