= European Working Group on Multiple Criteria Decision Aiding =

MCDA, European Working Group on Multiple Criteria Decision Aiding
- Formation: 1975
- Legal status: Working group
- Region served: Europe
- Parent organization: Association of European Operational Research Societies
- Website: www.cs.put.poznan.pl/ewgmcda/

The European Working Group on Multiple Criteria Decision Aiding (also, EURO Working Group on Multicriteria Decision Aiding, EWG on Multicriteria Aid for Decisions, or EWG-MCDA) is a working group whose objective is to promote original research in the field of multicriteria decision aiding at the European level.

EWG-MCDA is one of the working groups of EURO, the Association of European Operational Research Societies, and has approximately 350 members from 38 countries. The Group was founded in 1975 by Bernard Roy during the First European Conference on Operational Research (EURO I) held in Brussels, Belgium.

The objectives of the EURO Working Group on MCDA are the following:

- to contribute to the development, at a European level, of an original way of thinking in the field of multicriteria decision aiding;
- to allow each member of the group to present to others methodological, theoretical or applied results, to submit his/her own work and thoughts to critical discussion by the group, and also to facilitate collaboration;
- to develop multicriteria aid for decisions by facilitating contact between all people interested in the subject, and by stimulating continuity and progress in exchanges and work;
- to keep the group alive and open by means of bi-annual meetings which should not be mini-conferences but real meetings favourable to exchanges and to the emergence of new ideas.

Since 1975, the Working Group has met invariably twice a year. The 50th Anniversary meeting of the Group was held in 1999 at the château of the Centre Culturel International de Cerisy-la-Salle, in France. At the 72nd Meeting of the Group held in 2010 at the Ecole Centrale Paris, Bernard Roy stepped down from his position of the Group Coordinator and became the Honorary Chairman.

== The European School of MCDA ==
Most of the researchers or authors distinguish two major streams of MCDA methods:

- the American School or School of the MultiAttribute Utility Theory (MAUT), and
- the European school or methods of outranking and synthesis.

The development of the European School of Multiple Criteria Decision Aiding is mainly attributed to the EURO Working Group on MCDA. The European School directs its study to methodologies where the personal preferences of decision makers have less influence on the alternative chosen.

The methods of the European School are the ELECTRE family methods (ELimination Et Choix Traduisant la REalité) which stems from the pioneering work of Bernard Roy and whose development is strongly connected with the birth of the EWG on MCDA, and the PROMETHEE (PReference ranking Organization METHod for Enrichment Evaluations) method initiated by Professor Jean-Pierre Brans in the beginning of the eighties.

== See also ==
- Multi-criteria decision analysis
- ELECTRE
- PROMETHEE
