= Italian Operations Research Society =

Italian research institute

AIRO, Italian Operations Research Society
- Formation: 1961
- Legal status: Society
- Region served: Italy
- Parent organization: Association of European Operational Research Societies, International Federation of Operational Research Societies
- Website: www.airo.org

The Associazione Italiana di Ricerca Operativa (AIRO) – Optimization and Decision Sciences – is the professional non-profit society for the scientific field of Operations Research in Italy. The society is recognized by the International Federation of Operational Research Societies and its subgrouping, the Association of European Operational Research Societies, as the main national society for Operations Research in its country. AIRO is part of FIMA, the Italian Federation of Applied Mathematics.

== History ==
AIRO was created in 1961 with the aim of promoting the development of Operations Research and mathematical programming in Italy, both from a methodological and an applied research point of views. The recognition of the role and the professional qualification of the operation researchers and the promotion of relationships between operations researchers, inside and outside Italy, are strategic goals of AIRO.

Since 1961 the society has had the following presidents:

- Benedetto Barberi (1961-1970)
- Armando Corso (1971-1975)
- Bruno Martinoli (1976-1982)
- Massimo Merlino (1983-1988)
- Paolo Toth (1989-1995)
- Giorgio Gallo (1996-2001)
- Roberto Tadei (2002-2006)
- Renato De Leone (2007-2011)
- Anna Sciomachen (2012-2015)
- Daniele Vigo (2016-2019)
- Dario Pacciarelli (2020-2023)
- Raffaele Cerulli (2024-)

== Governance ==
AIRO is governed by a president, elected for a four-year term. The president manages the association with the Council, which consists of 15 members: thirteen elected by the assembly of AIRO members, the Current President, and either the Past President or the President-Elect (depending on the year). The council chooses one or two vice presidents, a treasurer and a secretary, among its elected members. AIRO members can propose the creation of AIRO thematic sections, based on either geographical or methodological and application affinity. The headquarters of AIRO is at the Institute of System Analysis and Informatics "Antonio Ruberti" (IASI, CNR) in Rome.

== Membership ==
As of 2020, AIRO had about 250 members including individuals and institutions from academia, industry and administration.

== Youth chapter ==
Since 2016, AIRO has had a youth chapter aimed at young researchers: AIROYoung. The chapter organises workshops and PhD schools, produces training resources, maintains a mailing list with relevant job market offers, and organises sessions at international conferences.

== Publications ==
Jointly with the Belgian Society for Operations Research and the French Operations Research Society, AIRO publishes 4OR - A Quarterly Journal of Operations Research, in which methodological and applied papers are published as well as surveys on relevant topics in the field of operations research. The society's publisher is Springer. The 2015 Impact Factor of the journal was 1.371.

The AIRO Springer Series, started in 2018, publishes contributed volumes resulting from conferences and other activities carried out by AIRO.

From 1970 to 2002, AIRO was responsible for the publication of the scientific journal Ricerca Operativa.

From the beginning of 2014 AIRO is involved in the Maddmaths project, a website for the dissemination of mathematical education. In particular, AIRO collaborates in the preparation of informative articles, sent via email as madd-letters to interested people.

== Conferences ==
Once a year in September, AIRO organizes the international conference ODS (Optimization and Decision Sciences), attended by about 200 participants. In addition, the AIROYoung chapter of AIRO organizes a winter workshop, usually in February, attended by about 70 participants.
