= Dolores Romero Morales =

Spanish operations researcher

María Dolores Romero Morales (born 5th August 1971) is a Spanish operations researcher and professor of operations research at the Copenhagen Business School. Topics in her research include supply chain management, revenue management, and data mining.

== Education and career ==
Romero studied mathematics at the University of Seville, earning bachelor's and master's degrees there in 1994. She completed a Ph.D. in operations research at Erasmus University Rotterdam in 2000. Her dissertation, Optimization Problems in Supply Chain Management, was jointly promoted by Jo van Nunen and H. Edwin Romeijn.

She was an assistant professor of business administration at the University of Cádiz from 1995 to 1996, and at the University of Seville in 1998. After completing her doctorate, she became an assistant professor in operations research in the department of quantitative economics at Maastricht University in 2000. She moved to the University of Oxford in 2003 as a lecturer and fellow of St Cross College, Oxford; at Oxford, she was promoted to reader in 2006 and professor in 2012. She moved to the Copenhagen Business School in 2014.

== Contributions ==
Romero is the editor-in-chief of TOP, a Spanish journal in operations research, for 2020 to 2022. She is also the coordinator of the Network of European Data Scientists (NeEDS), an EU project founded in 2019 that aims to apply big data analysis to coronavirus-related predictions.
