= Charles Schoebel =

French ethnologist, palaeographer and linguist

Charles Schoebel, born Ludwigslust 20 October 1813, is a 19th-century French ethnologist, palaeographer and linguist.

== Works ==
- Analogies constitutives de la langue allemande avec le grec et le latin expliquées par le samskrit, 1845
- L'Éternité et la consommation des temps, 1854
- Le Bouddha et le bouddhisme, 1857
- De l'Universalité du déluge, 1858
- Démonstration critique de l'authenticité du Pentateuque sous le triple rapport de la personnalité historique de Moi͏̈se, son auteur, de son unité et de sa vérité, 1858
- Les Stations d'Israël dans le désert : examen des objections faites par les rationnalistes allemands et quelques écrivains français contre le récit de Moyse à propos des campements des Israélites dans le désert, 1859
- De l'universalité du déluge, 1859
- De l'Agitation réformiste en Allemagne, 1859
- Mémoires sur les six jours ou époques de la Genèse, 1859
- Le Centième Anniversaire de la naissance de Schiller, 1859
- Satan et la chute de l'homme, 1859
- L'Histoire de Balaam, l'authenticité de sa prophétie, 1860
- Mémoire sur le monothéisme primitif attribué par M. E. Renan à la seule race sémitique, 1860
- Examen critique du déchiffrement des Inscriptions cunéiformes assyriennes : [compte rendu critique de l'] expédition scientifique en Mésopotamie par Jules Oppert, 1861
- La Bhagavad-Gita : étude de philosophie indienne, 1861
- La Philologie comparée de l'origine du langage, Paris : Duprat, 1862
- Philosophie de la raison pure, avec un appendice de critique historique par M. Schoebel / Paris : G. Baillière, 1865
- L'Unité organique du Faust de Goethe, Paris : Challamel aîné, 1867
- Démonstration critique de l'authenticité mosai͏̈que du Deutéronome, Paris : E. Thorin, 1868
- Un Manuscrit bas-allemand restitué, annoté et traduit par C. Schoebel, / Paris : Challamel aîné, 1868
- Recherches sur la religion première de la race indo-irânienne, Paris : Maisonneuve, 1868
- Démonstration de l'authenticité mosai͏̈que du Lévitique et des Nombres, Paris : Maisonneuve, 1869
- Étude sur le rituel du respect social dans l'état brahmanique, Paris : Maisonneuve, 1870
- Démonstration de l'authenticité mosaïque de l'Exode, Paris : Maisonneuve, 1871
- La Question d'Alsace au point de vue ethnographique, Paris : Sandoz et Fischbacher, 1872
- Les Slaves du nord de l'Allemagne, Paris : Challamel aîné, 1872
- Recherches sur la religion première de la race indo-iranienne. Deuxième éd. revue et augmentée, Paris : Maisonneuve et Cie, 1872
- La question d'Alsace au point de vue ethnographique, Paris : Ch. Meyrueis, 1872
- Démonstration de l'authenticité de la Genèse, Paris : Maisonneuve, 1873-1877
- Le Buddhisme : ses origines, le Nirvana, accord de la morale avec le Nirvana, Paris : Maisonneuve, 1874
- Le Moïse historique, Paris : Maisonneuve, 1875
- Le Mythe de la femme et du serpent: étude sur les origines d'une évolution psychologique primordiale, Paris : Maisonneuve, 1876
- La Légende du Juif-errant, Paris : Maisonneuve, 1877
- L'histoire des rois mages, Paris : Maisonneuve et Cie, 1878
- L'Âme humaine au point de vue de la science ethnographique, suivi d'une note sur Claude Bernard et son principe du criterium expérimental, 2e édition / Paris : 47, avenue Duquesne, 1878?
- Inde française. L'histoire des origines et du développement des castes de l'Inde, Paris : Challamel aîné, 1884
- Les Doctrines cosmogoniques et philosophiques de l'Inde, Louvain : impr. de C. Peeters, 1886
- Le Râmâyana au point de vue religieux, philosophique et moral, Paris : E. leroux, 1888
- La Légende des Pandavas, [S. l.] : [s. n.], [1870]
- Le Rituel brahmanique du respect social, traduit du sanscrit par Charles Schoebel / Paris : impr. de Vve Bouchard-Huzard, [1874]
- Mémoire sur les origines de l'écriture alphabétique, [S. l. ] : [s. n.], [1879]
- Étude sur le verbe Être, Paris, [18??]
