= Anita Schöbel =

German mathematician

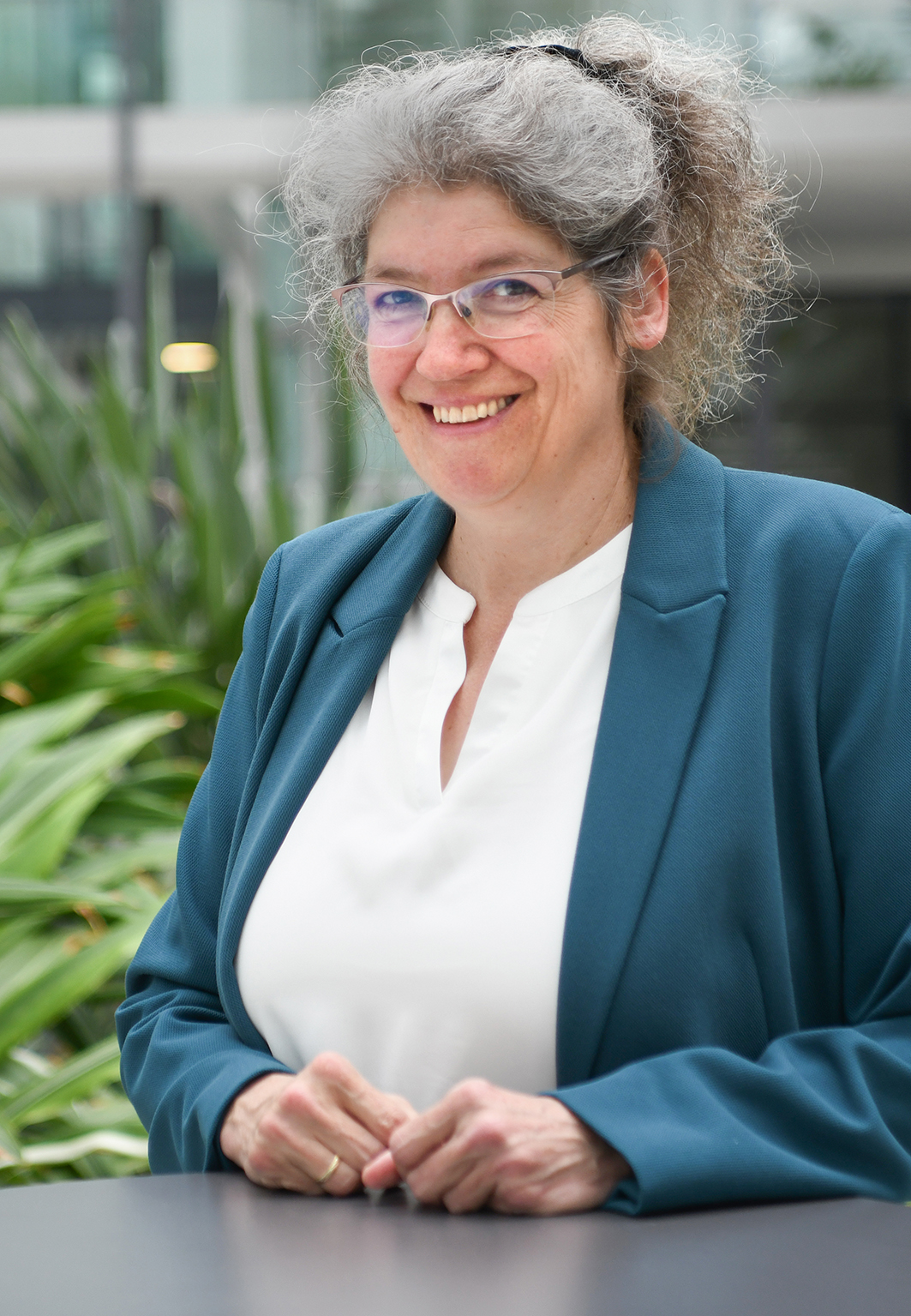
Anita Schöbel

Anita Schöbel (born 1969) is a German mathematician and operations researcher known for her work in facility location and mathematical optimization of timetables for public transportation. She is a professor of mathematics at the University of Kaiserslautern, where she is head of the optimization group and director of the Fraunhofer Institute for Industrial Mathematics. She is also the president of the German Operations Research Society.

== Education and career ==
Schöbel studied mathematics and economics at the University of Kaiserslautern, earning a diploma in mathematics in 1994 and a doctorate (Dr. rer. nat.) in 1998. Her dissertation, Locating Lines and Hyperplanes – Theory and Algorithms, was jointly supervised by Horst W. Hamacher and Horst Martini.

She remained at Kaiserslautern as a researcher in the Traffic Department in the Institute of Industrial Mathematics. She moved to the department of mathematics in 1999, and earned her habilitation at Kaiserslautern in 2003. Her habilitation thesis was Customer-oriented Optimization in Public Transportation. In 2004 she moved to the University of Göttingen as a professor, and in 2019 she returned to Kaiserslautern as a professor of mathematics and director of the Fraunhofer Institute for Industrial Mathematics.

== Books ==
Schöbel published her dissertation, Locating Lines and Hyperplanes: Theory and Algorithms, as a book with Kluwer in 1999. She is also the author of another book incorporating material from her habilitation thesis, Optimization in Public Transportation: Stop Location, Delay Management and Tariff Zone Design in a Public Transportation Network (Springer, 2006).
