= Daniel Peña (novelist) =

United States writer

- Born: Daniel Inouye Peña; February 9, 1988 (age 38); Austin, Texas, U.S.
- Citizenship: Mexico; United States
- Education: Texas A&M University; Cornell University
- Occupations: Writer, professor
- Writing career
- Language: English, Spanish
- Genre: Literary Fiction
- Notable work: Bang
- Notable awards: Pushcart Prize
- Website: danielpena.me

Daniel Inouye Peña (born February 9, 1988) is a Mexican-American novelist, essayist, and critic frequently published in The Guardian and Ploughshares blogs, as well as several other publications. He received the Pushcart Prize in 2016 for his short story "Safe Home" which appeared in the 2017 Pushcart anthology. His debut novel Bang was published on January 30, 2018, through Arte Público Press, a publisher of contemporary literature by Hispanic authors. His second book, How to Look Away: On American Cruelty and the Refusal to Disappear, is scheduled for publication on October 6, 2026, by Penguin Random House/One World. Peña lives in Dallas.

== Early life and education ==
Daniel Peña is an Austin native with dual U.S. and Mexican citizenship. His extended family resides in northern Mexico. Peña took pilot training in College Station, where he completed 150 hours of flying required for his private pilot's license while studying English at Texas A&M University. While pursuing his career in piloting private planes, he encountered Mexican aircraft used for drug cartels, which provided inspiration for his short story "Safe Home."

As an undergraduate student, Peña planned to go to law school, but changed his goal once he studied under National Book Award-winning author Larry Heinemann, who encouraged him to write. When the airline industry failed, Peña applied to Cornell University in 2014 to pursue his MFA in creative writing. He received a Fulbright scholarship and committed his research and studies to the drug war in America and its lasting impact on Mexico. During this time, his writings focused primarily on drug trafficking and his political perspective on militarized borders.

== Career ==
Peña was based out at the Universidad Nacional Autónoma de México (UNAM) in Mexico City, where he worked as a writer, blogger, book reviewer and journalist as a Fulbright-García Robles scholar. He was also a former Picador Guest Professor in Leipzig, Germany. He taught English courses at Cornell, Louisiana State University, and the University of Houston-Downtown, before arriving at The University of North Texas as an assistant professor in the Department of English in 2022. Peña teaches fiction and theory courses in their PhD program in creative writing.

Peña's writings have appeared in NBC News, Vice, Houston Public Media, Chicago Review of Books, The Rumpus, Arcturus, and the Kenyon Review. He's currently a regular contributor to the Guardian and Ploughshares blogs, where he has published critical essays and articles such as "T-Shirts, Deportation, and the Epiphanies of Clemens Meyer in Mexico City" and "Torture of ordinary Mexicans may be shocking, but not surprising." Other articles and stories can be found on his blog.

Peña was chosen as "Author of the Month" on Houston Public Media in March 2018.

== Literary contributions ==
Peña's publications have contributed to the overall awareness of drug smuggling and its effects on the American population. His novel Bang provides insight on the struggles of undocumented immigrants and the everyday and interpersonal negative effects of deregulating capital markets and lowering trade barriers in international trade, especially in regard to NAFTA. He also brings into discussion how American immigration policy and America's drug war in Mexico are inextricably interlinked.

== Selected works ==
- Bang (novel, Arte Público Press, January 2018)
- "Safe Home" (short story, Ploughshares, August 2015)
- "Writing from Exile" (critical essay, Ploughshares, November 2018)
- "The Protest Mexico's Pro-Government Twitter Bots Couldn't Silence" (article, VICE, September 2015)
- "What We Talk About When We Talk About Humanizing People In Literature" (critical essay, Ploughshares, March 2018)
