= Da Ruan =

Chinese-Belgian mathematician, scientist, and professor

- Born: September 10, 1960; Shanghai, China
- Died: July 31, 2011 (aged 50); Mol, Belgium
- Occupation: Mathematician

Da Ruan (Chinese: 阮达; September 10, 1960 – July 31, 2011) was a Chinese-Belgian mathematician, scientist, professor. He had a Ph.D. from Ghent University.

== Bibliography ==
- Fuzzy set theory and advanced mathematical applications (1995, Kluwer Academic Publishers)
