= Yili Normal University =

Teachers' university in Yining, Yili, Xinjiang Uyghur Autonomous Region, China

Coordinates: 43.9342°N 81.3026°E

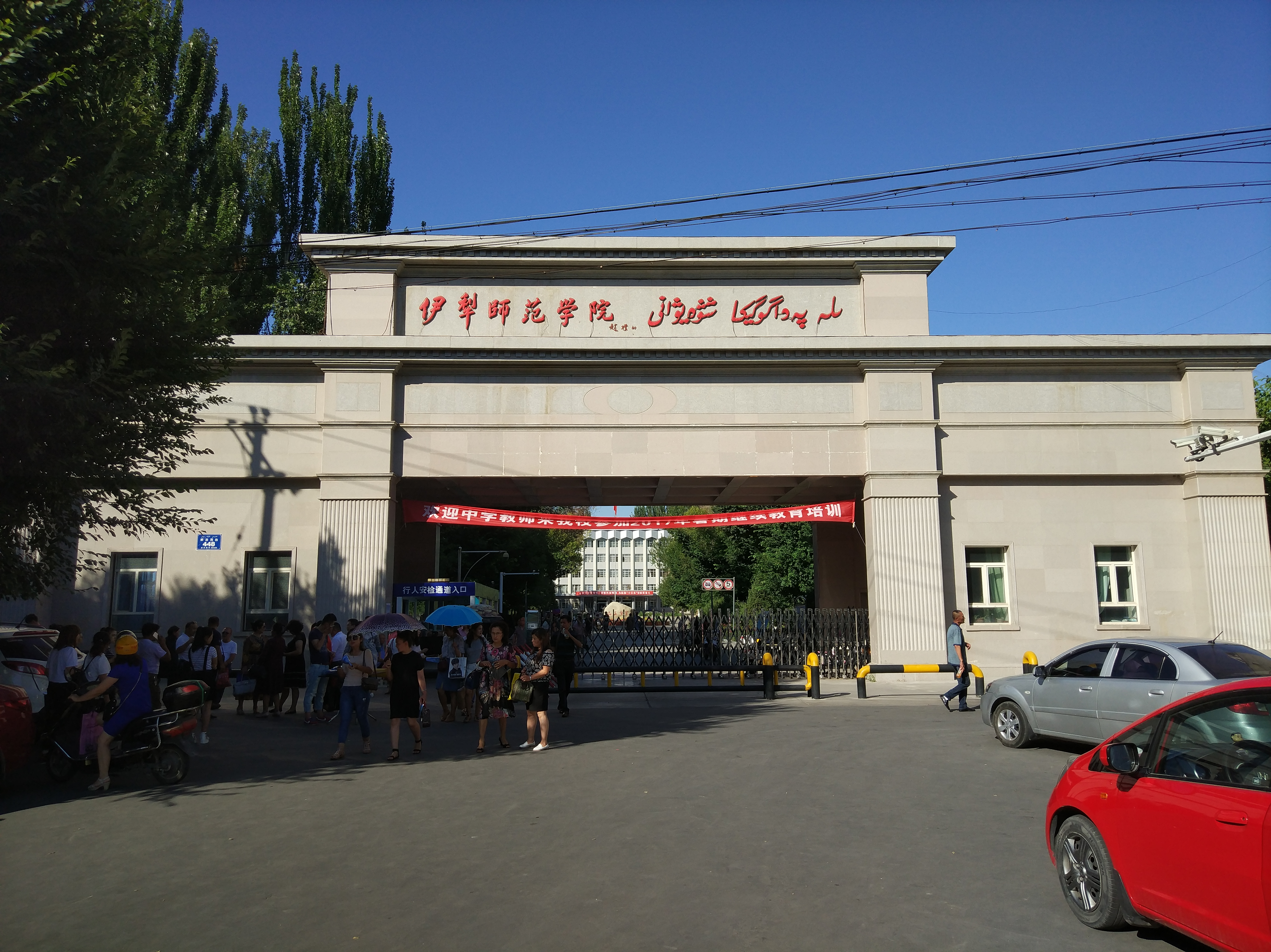
- Main Gate of Yili Normal University

Location
- 448 Jiefang Xilu, Yining, Yili, Xinjiang, China

Information
- Type: Public
- Motto: 品正学实
- Established: 17 April 1948; 78 years ago
- Staff: 941
- Faculty: 621
- Enrollment: 14,134
- Area: 1.25 square kilometers
- Website: www.ylsy.edu.cn

Yili Normal University (Chinese: 伊犁师范大学; Kazakh: ىلە سىفان داشۋەىسى) is a higher normal school in Ili Kazakh Autonomous Prefecture, Xinjiang, China. It is co-funded by the Ministry of Education, Xinjiang Uygur Autonomous Government, and Jiangsu Provincial Government with the support from Nanjing University and Nanjing Normal University.

== History ==
- April 17, 1948: Yili Vocational College
- October, 1949: Ehmetjan Vocational College
- April, 1953: Yili Normal School (伊犁师范学校; Yīlí Shīfàn Xuéxiào; 'Yili Normal School')
- May 7, 1980: Yili Normal College (伊犁师范学院; Yīlí Shīfàn Xuéyuàn; 'Yili Normal College')
- December, 2018: Yili Normal University (伊犁师范大学; Yīlí Shīfàn Dàxué; 'Yili Normal University')

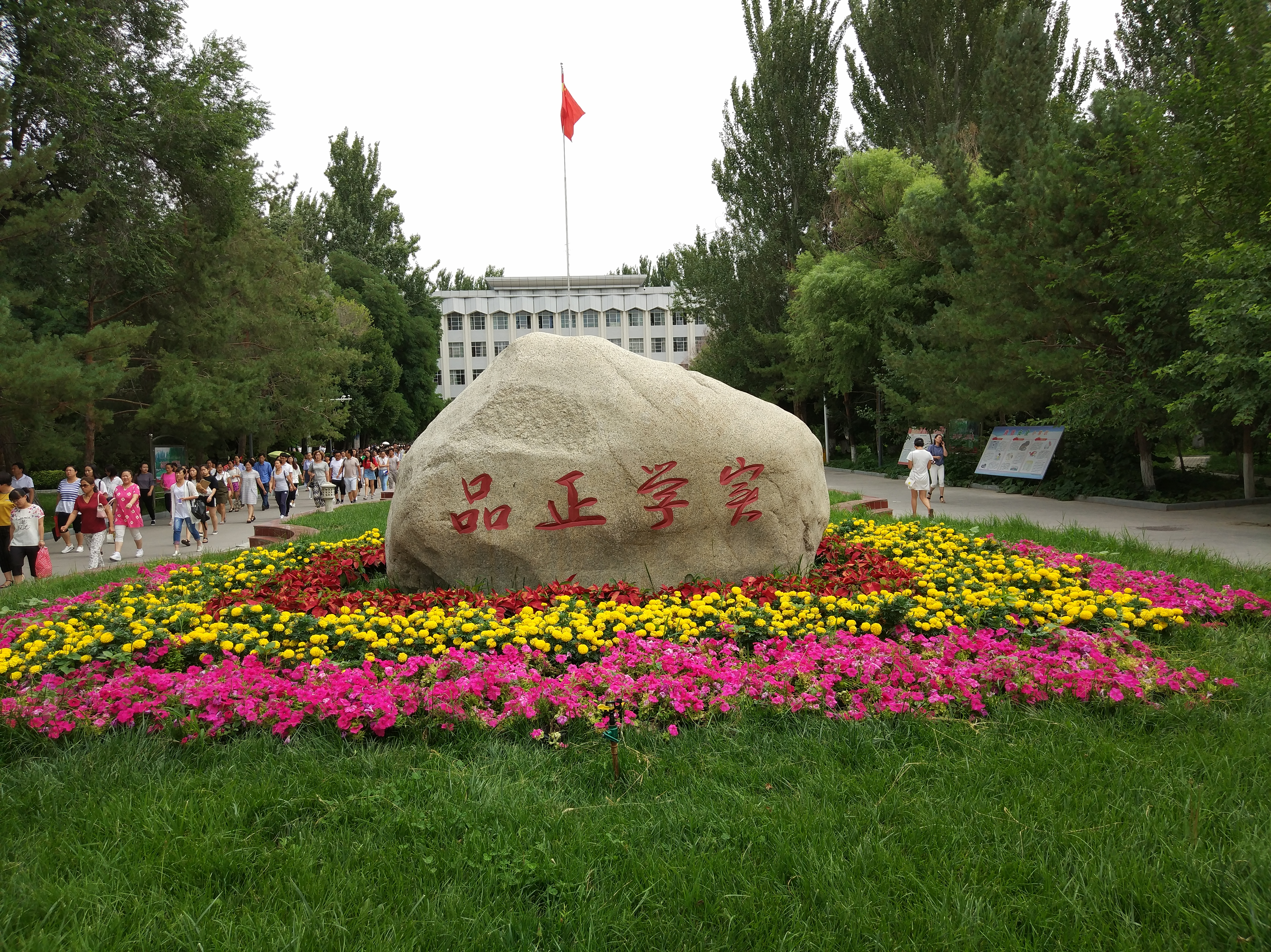
A stone with the motto "Pinzheng Xueshi" (lit. "Behave well, academic solid")
