= Austrian Society of Operations Research =

Professional non-profit scientific society

ÖGOR, Austrian Society for Operations Research
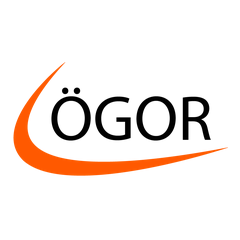
- Formation: 1978
- Legal status: Society
- Purpose: To promote operations research
- Headquarters: Vienna
- Region served: Austria
- Parent organization: Association of European Operational Research Societies; International Federation of Operational Research Societies
- Website: www.oegor.at

The Österreichische Gesellschaft für Operations Research (ÖGOR) (Austrian Society of Operations Research) is the professional non-profit society for the scientific field of Operations Research in Austria. The society, founded in 1978, is recognized by the International Federation of Operational Research Societies and its subgrouping, the Association of European Operational Research Societies, as the main national society for Operations Research in its country.

As of 2026, the President of ÖGOR is Ulrich Pferschy.

== Publications ==
ÖGOR publishes a scientific journal, the Central European Journal of Operations Research (CEJOR), which is published by Springer. The current Editor-in-Chief of CEJOR is the former ÖGOR president Ulrike Leopold-Wildburger. Furthermore, the ÖGOR News are published once or twice a year containing news about the society.

== Awards ==
Every year ÖGOR awards an award for both the best Masters Thesis as well as the best PhD Thesis in the field of Operations Research in Austria.
