= Daniel Peña (engineer) =

Spanish engineer and statistician

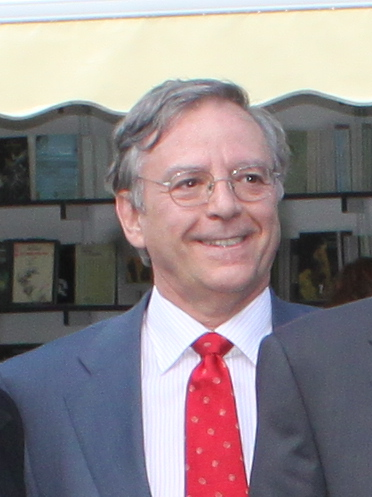
- Daniel Peña (2010)
- Born: 1948 (age 77–78); Madrid
- Education: Technical University of Madrid, Complutense University of Madrid, Harvard University
- Occupations: Engineer, statistician

Daniel Peña Sánchez de Rivera (Madrid, 1948) is a Spanish engineer and statistician.

== Education ==
Peña obtained a Ph.D. in industrial engineering from the Technical University of Madrid and studied sociology and statistics at Complutense University of Madrid and business administration Harvard University. He is an active researcher in statistics and econometrics and was rector of Charles III University of Madrid in 2007–2015.

== Career ==
He has been professor at Technical University of Madrid, and visiting professor at University of Wisconsin–Madison and University of Chicago. He is now Emeritus professor at Charles III University of Madrid. He has been director of the Journal Revista Estadística Española and President of Sociedad española de Estadística e Investigación Operativa, Vicepresident of the Interamerican Statistical Institute and President of European Courses in Advanced Statistics.

He has published fourteen books and more than 250 research articles in time series analysis, multivariate methods, Bayesian Statistics and Econometrics that have received more than 10,000 references. He is fellow of the American Statistical Association, The Institute of Mathematical Statistics and member of the International Statistical Institute and member of the Royal Academie of Sciences in Spain. He has received the Youden Prize in 2006, from ASA and ASQ, the Premio Rey Jaime I for his research in 2011 and the first "Premio Nacional de Estadística" of Spain in 2020.
