= International Federation of Operational Research Societies =

Umbrella organization of research societies

The International Federation of Operational Research Societies (IFORS) is an umbrella organization for national operations research societies of over 45 countries from four geographical regions: Asia Pacific, Europe, North America, and South America.

The organization was officially founded in 1959 by three organizations: the Operation Research Society of America (United States), the Operational Research Society (United Kingdom ), and the Société française de Recherche Opérationnelle (France), although the first IFORS conference was held in Oxford in 1957.

The Statutes, set the purpose of the IFORS to be "the development of operational research as a unified science and its advancement in all nations of the world." An interesting aspect of the Statutes is that in formal votings of the Board the voting power of each member society is proportional to the square root of the qualified membership — thus giving the greater weight of the larger societies but not overwhelming the smaller societies.

== Presidents of the IFORS ==
- 1959 – 1961 Sir Charles Goodeve
- 1962 – 1964 Philip Morse
- 1965 – 1966 Marcel Boiteux
- 1967 Charles Salzmann
- 1968 – 1970 Alec M. Lee
- 1971 – 1973 Arne Jensen
- 1974 – 1976 Takehiko Matsuda
- 1977 – 1979 David B. Hertz
- 1983 – 1985 Heiner Müller-Merbach
- 1986 – 1988 Jacques Lesourne
- 1989 – 1991 William Pierskalla
- 2013 – 2015 Nelson Maculan
- 2016 – 2018 Michael Trick
- 2019 – 2021 M. Grazia Speranza
- 2022 – 2024 Janny Leung
- 2025 – 2027 Hector Cancela
