= European Chapter on Combinatorial Optimization =

ECCO, European Chapter on Combinatorial Optimization
- Formation: 1987
- Legal status: Working group
- Purpose: To promote combinatorial optimization
- Region served: Europe
- Parent organization: Association of European Operational Research Societies
- Website: ecco.grenoble-inp.fr

The European Chapter on Combinatorial Optimization (also, EURO Working Group on Combinatorial Optimization, or EWG ECCO) is a working group whose objective is to promote original research in the field of combinatorial optimization at the European level.

== History ==
ECCO is one of the working groups of EURO, the Association of European Operational Research Societies. The Group was founded in 1987 by Catherine Roucairol, Alexander Rinnooy Kan, and Dominique de Werra.

== Governance ==
The group is managed by an Advisory Board of 4 members and a Coordinator. The Advisory Board is currently composed of Jacek Błażewicz, Van Dat Cung, Alain Hertz, and Paolo Toth. The current coordinator is Silvano Martello.

== Membership ==
The group is suitable for people who are presently engaged in Combinatorial Optimization, either in theoretical aspects or in business, industry or public administration applications. Currently (2022), the group has over 1,600 members from 75 countries.

== Conferences ==
ECCO holds conferences on a regular basis (once a year during Spring). An abstract booklet is distributed to the participants at each meeting.

== Publications ==
In most cases, the annual conference is followed by a peer reviewed special issue of an international journal, presenting a selection of the contributions presented at the meeting. Recent special issues appeared on Annals of Operations Research , Optimization, Journal of Scheduling, Discrete Applied Mathematics, and Journal of Combinatorial Optimization.

A newsletter is emailed to all members every three months.
