= Silvano Martello =

Italian scientist and engineer

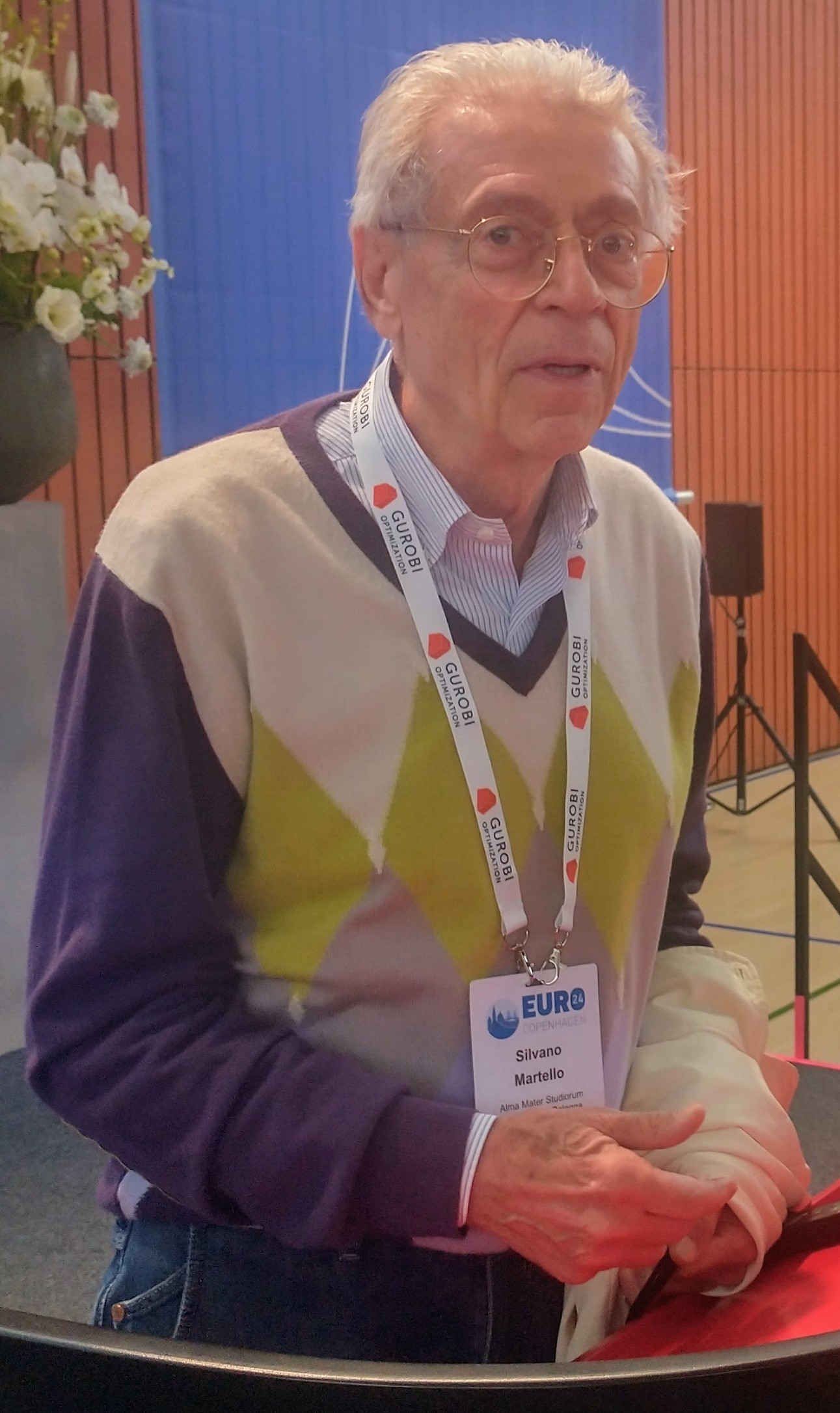
- Silvano Martello in 2024
- Born: Bologna, Italy
- Citizenship: Italian
- Occupation: Emeritus Professor of Operations Research
- Title: Emeritus Professor
- Board member of: EURO, ECCO, AIRO
- Awards: EURO Gold Medal, IFORS Distinguished Lecturer

Academic background
- Education: University of Bologna

Academic work
- Discipline: Operations Research
- Sub-discipline: Combinatorial Optimization
- Institutions: University of Bologna
- Main interests: Knapsack Problem, Assignment Problem, Packing Problems, Routing Problems
- Notable works: Knapsack problems: Algorithms and Computer implementations; Assignment Problems
- Website: https://www.unibo.it/sitoweb/silvano.martello/en

Silvano Martello (born in Bologna, Italy) is an Italian scientist and engineer, and an Emeritus Professor of Operations Research at the University of Bologna. He is known for his research in Operations Research and Mathematical Programming. In particular, he made significant contributions in the areas of knapsack and assignment problems, packing problems, and vehicle routing. As of 2023, he published 160 peer-reviewed articles and was cited more than 7000 times.

He was vice-president of the Association of European Operational Research Societies (EURO) from 2014 to 2017, and has been chairman of the European Chapter on Combinatorial Optimization (ECCO) since 1997.

He is editor-in-chief of 4OR, the joint official journal of the Belgian, French, and Italian Operations Research Societies.

Among his PhD students are Andrew H. and Ann R. Tisch Professor Andrea Lodi (Cornell Tech), and Professor Mauro dell'Amico (University of Modena and Reggio Emilia).

== Education and early career ==
Martello graduated from the University of Bologna with a degree in Electronic Engineering in 1973. He was an assistant and then an associate professor at the University of Bologna from 1980 to 1990. From 1990 to 1994 he was a full professor of Operations Research and Management Science at the University of Turin. Since 1994 he is a full professor of Operations Research at the University of Bologna.

== Research ==
Martello developed algorithms for the 0–1 knapsack problem with Paolo Toth. They wrote a paper in 1977 where they improved an upper bound for the problem and presented a branch and bound algorithm to solve it. Its performance was tested by means of computational experiments.

In 1988, Martello and Toth published another algorithm to solve the 0–1 knapsack problem. Their approach for optimally solving the problem was based on a smaller subset of items for which the core problem was solved. This provided a heuristic solution to the original problem that with high probability was optimal. The algorithm incorporated new methods to compute the upper bounds as well as procedures to reduce the size of the problem.

== Awards ==
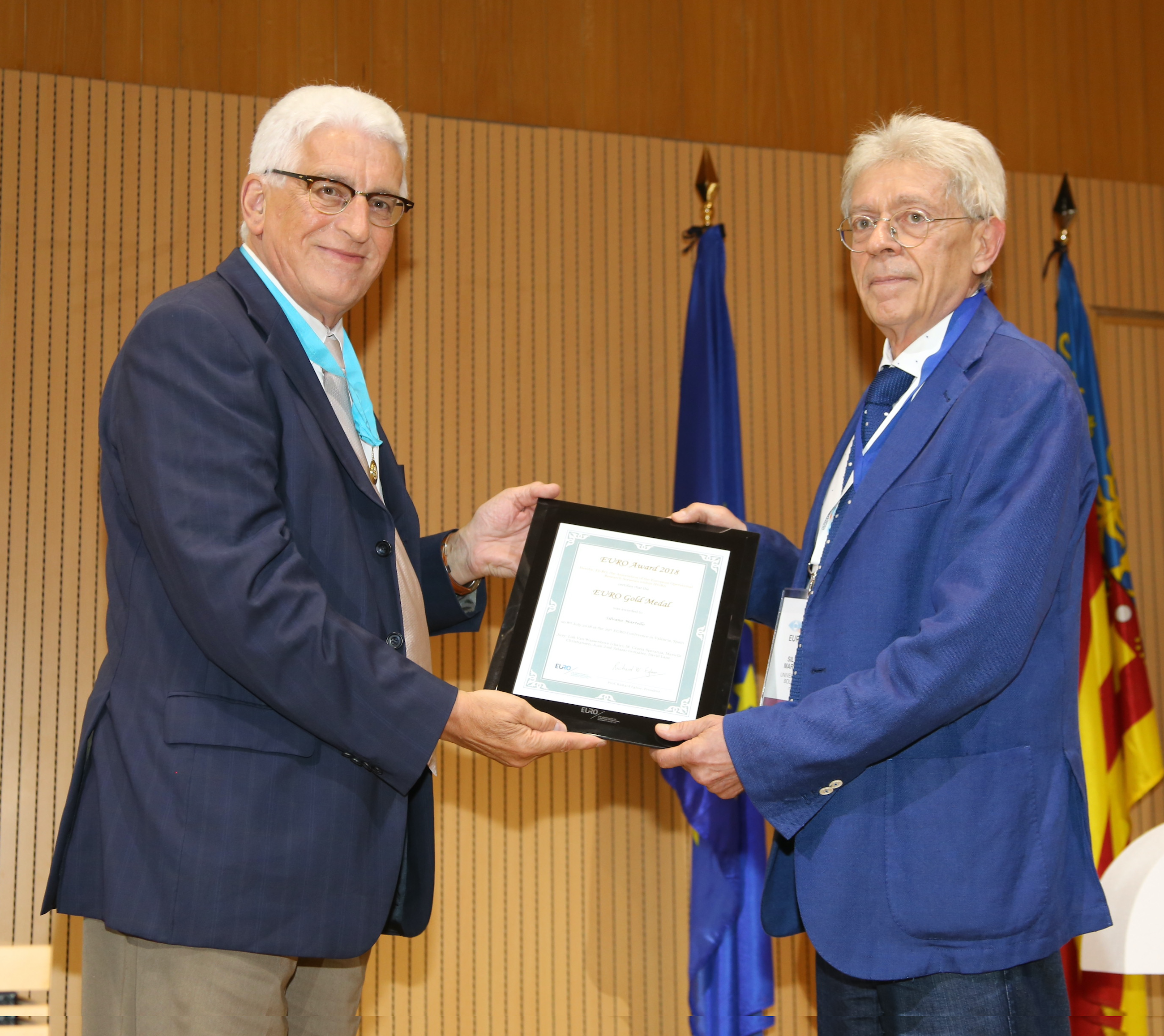
Silvano Martello (right) receives the EURO Gold Medal Award from Luk Van Wassenhove (left).

- 2012 - IFORS Distinguished Lecturer.
- 2018 - Omega (journal) best paper award.
- 2018 - EURO Gold Medal from the Association of European Operational Research Societies.

== Books ==
He is the co-author, with Paolo Toth, of the book Knapsack problems: Algorithms and Computer implementations (John Wiley & Sons, Inc., 1990). He also co-authored, with Rainer Burkard and Mauro dell'Amico, the book Assignment Problems (SIAM, 2009).
