= China Communications =

China Communications may refer to either

- China Communications Construction Company
- China Communications (journal)
