= Taniec z gwiazdami season 22 =

Polish edition of Dancing with the Stars

Taniec z gwiazdami
- Season 22
- Hosted by: Krzysztof Ibisz; Paulina Sykut-Jeżyna
- Judges: Iwona Pavlović; Andrzej Grabowski; Ola Jordan
- Celebrity winner: Joanna Mazur
- Professional winner: Jan Kliment
- No. of episodes: 11

Release
- Original network: Polsat
- Original release: 1 March – 17 May 2019

Season chronology
- ← Previous; Season 21 Next → Season 23

The 22nd season of Taniec z gwiazdami, the Polish edition of Dancing with the Stars, started on 1 March 2019. This is the ninth season aired on Polsat. Paulina Sykut-Jeżyna and Krzysztof Ibisz returned as host and Iwona Pavlović, Ola Jordan and Andrzej Grabowski returned as judges. Michał Malitowski return due to injury only in Season Finale.

On 17 May, Joanna Mazur and her partner Jan Kliment were crowned the champions.

== Couples ==
Celebrity	Notability	Professional partner	Status
Anna Jagodzińska	Model	Michał Jeziorowski	Eliminated 1st on 8 March 2019
Dominika Tajner-Wiśniewska	Music manager and Apoloniusz Tajner's daughter	Wojciech Jeschke	Eliminated 2nd on 8 March 2019
Czadoman	Disco polo singer	Valeriya Zhuravlyova	Eliminated 3rd on 15 March 2019
Sebastian Stankiewicz	Actor and comedian	Janja Lesar	Eliminated 4th on 22 March 2019
Justyna Żyła	Culinary blogger and Piotr Żyła's ex-wife	Tomasz Barański	Eliminated 5th on 29 March 2019
Daniel Kuczaj	Fitness coach known as Qczaj	Paulina Biernat	Eliminated 6th on 5 April 2019
Agnieszka Radwańska	Tennis player and 20-time WTA title winner	Stefano Terrazzino	Eliminated 7th on 12 April 2019
Mariusz Węgłowski	Policjantki i policjanci actor and former policeman	Katarzyna Vu Manh	Eliminated 8th on 26 April 2019
Jakub Kucner	Mister Poland 2017, model and actor	Lenka Klimentová	Eliminated 9th on 3 May 2019
Tamara Gonzalez Perea	Fashion blogger known as Macademian Girl and television presenter	Rafał Maserak	Third Place on 10 May 2019
Tomasz Działowy	Vlogger known as Gimper	Natalia Głębocka	Runners-up on 17 May 2019
Joanna Mazur	Blind sprinter and European Champion 2016	Jan Kliment	Winners on 17 May 2019

== Scores ==
Couple	Place	1	2	1+2	3	4	5	6	7	8	9	10		11
Joanna & Jan	1	26†	23	49†	28†	28†	24	26+28=54	24+3=27†	30+30=60†	28+30=58†	30+30=60†	—	38+36+40=114†
Tomasz & Natalia	2	16	10‡	26	13	16	21	14+26=40‡	20	23+25=48	21+17=38‡	19+14=33‡	+23=56‡	23+28+31=82‡
Tamara & Rafał	3	18	28†	46	26	28†	30†	28+28=56	23	30+30=60†	26+29=55	28+29=57	+30=87†	
Jakub & Lenka	4	13	22	35	14	21	15‡	20+26=46	22+3=25	20+21=41‡	18+23=41			
Mariusz & Katarzyna	5	17	12	29	22	23	28	24+26=50	19‡	21+21=42				
Agnieszka & Stefano	6	18	22	40	22	24	26	30+28=58†	22+3=25					
Daniel & Paulina	7	20	20	40	19	27	18	21+26=47						
Justyna & Tomasz	8	8‡	11	19‡	8‡	14‡	15‡							
Sebastian & Janja	9	22	22	44	25	22								
Czadoman & Valeriya	10	18	13	31	20									
Dominika & Wojciech	11	14	11	25										
Anna & Michał	12	18	22	40										

Red numbers indicate the lowest score for each week.
Green numbers indicate the highest score for each week.
indicates the couple eliminated that week.
indicates the returning couple that finished in the bottom two or three.
indicates the couple saved from elimination by immunity.
indicates the winning couple.
indicates the runner-up.
indicates the couple in third place.

== Average score chart ==
This table only counts for dances scored on a 30-points (scores by Michał Malitowski are excluded in Season Finale) scale.

Rank by average	Place	Couple	Total points	Number of dances	Average
1	1	Joanna & Jan	472	17	27.8
2	3	Tamara & Rafał	411	15	27.4
3	6	Agnieszka & Stefano	192	8	24.0
4	9	Sebastian & Janja	91	4	22.8
5	7	Daniel & Paulina	151	7	21.6
6	5	Mariusz & Katarzyna	213	10	21.3
7	12	Anna & Michał	40	2	20.0
8	4	Jakub & Lenka	235	12	19.6
9	2	Tomasz & Natalia	343	18	19.1
10	10	Czadoman & Valeriya	51	3	17.0
11	11	Dominika & Wojciech	25	2	12.5
12	8	Justyna & Tomasz	56	5	11.2

== Highest and lowest scoring performances ==
The best and worst performances in each dance according to the judges' 30-point scale (scores by Michał Malitowski are excluded in Season Finale) are as follows:

Dance	Best dancer(s)	Highest score	Worst dancer(s)	Lowest score
Cha-cha-cha	Tamara Gonzalez Perea; Agnieszka Radwańska	26	Justyna Żyła	8
Waltz	Joanna Mazur	30	Czadoman; Anna Jagodzińska	18
Jive	Joanna Mazur	30	Czadoman	13
Tango	Tamara Gonzalez Perea; Joanna Mazur	28	Tomasz Działowy	10
Viennese Waltz	Daniel Kuczaj	27	Justyna Żyła	15
Quickstep	Tamara Gonzalez Perea; Joanna Mazur	30	Jakub Kucner	15
Rumba	Joanna Mazur	30	Dominika Tajner-Wiśniewska	11
Foxtrot	Tamara Gonzalez Perea; Joanna Mazur	29	Justyna Żyła	11
Samba	Tamara Gonzalez Perea; Joanna Mazur	28	Tomasz Działowy	17
Salsa	Jakub Kucner	20	Justyna Żyła	8
Argentine Tango	Sebastian Stankiewicz	22		
Contemporary	Tamara Gonzalez Perea; Agnieszka Radwańska	30	Daniel Kuczaj	21
Paso Doble	Tamara Gonzalez Perea	28	Tomasz Działowy	19
Team Dance	Tamara Gonzalez Perea; Joanna Mazur; Agnieszka Radwańska	28	Daniel Kuczaj; Mariusz Węgłowski; Jakub Kucner; Tomasz Działowy	26
Freestyle	Tamara Gonzalez Perea; Joanna Mazur	30	Jakub Kucner	20
Showdance	Joanna Mazur	30	Tomasz Działowy	24

== Couples' highest and lowest scoring dances ==
According to the 30-point scale (scores by Michał Malitowski are excluded in Season Finale):

Couples	Highest scoring dance(s)	Lowest scoring dance(s)
Joanna & Jan	Freestyle, Jive, Quickstep, Waltz, Rumba, Showdance (30)	Cha-cha-cha (23)
Tomasz & Natalia	Waltz (25)	Tango (10)
Tamara & Rafał	Contemporary (twice), Freestyle, Quickstep (30)	Cha-cha-cha (18)
Jakub & Lenka	Waltz (23)	Tango (13)
Mariusz & Katarzyna	Jive (28)	Rumba (12)
Agnieszka & Stefano	Contemporary (30)	Jive (18)
Daniel & Paulina	Viennese Waltz (27)	Foxtrot (18)
Justyna & Tomasz	Viennese Waltz (15)	Cha-cha-cha, Salsa (8)
Sebastian & Janja	Cha-cha-cha (25)	Jive, Waltz, Argentine Tango (22)
Czadoman & Valeriya	Tango (20)	Jive (13)
Dominika & Wojciech	Tango (14)	Rumba (11)
Anna & Michał	Cha-cha-cha (22)	Waltz (18)

== Weekly scores ==
Unless indicated otherwise, individual judges scores in the charts below (given in parentheses) are listed in this order from left to right: Iwona Pavlović, Andrzej Grabowski and Ola Jordan (In Season Finale also Michał Malitowski).

=== Week 1: Season Premiere ===
No elimination took place.

Running order

Couple	Score	Dance	Music
Daniel & Paulina	20 (6,7,7)	Cha-cha-cha	"Promises"—Calvin Harris ft. Sam Smith
Tamara & Rafał	18 (5,7,6)	Cha-cha-cha	"Sofia"—Álvaro Soler
Czadoman & Valeriya	18 (5,7,6)	Waltz	"When I Need You"—Leo Sayer
Sebastian & Janja	22 (7,8,7)	Jive	"Małomiasteczkowy"—Dawid Podsiadło
Anna & Michał	18 (5,7,6)	Waltz	"If You Don't Know Me by Now"—Simply Red
Mariusz & Katarzyna	17 (4,6,7)	Tango	"Sweet Dreams (Are Made of This)"—Eurythmics
Justyna & Tomasz	8 (1,5,2)	Cha-cha-cha	"The Shoop Shoop Song (It's in His Kiss)"—Cher
Jakub & Lenka	13 (3,6,4)	Tango	"Łowcy gwiazd"—Cleo
Joanna & Jan	26 (8,10,8)	Viennese Waltz	"Perfect"—Ed Sheeran
Tomasz & Natalia	16 (4,7,5)	Jive	"Take On Me"—A-ha
Dominika & Wojciech	14 (4,6,4)	Tango	"Tamta dziewczyna"—Sylwia Grzeszczak
Agnieszka & Stefano	18 (5,8,5)	Jive	"Feel It Still"—Portugal. The Man

=== Week 2 ===
Running order

Couple	Score	Dance	Music	Result
Joanna & Jan	23 (6,10,7)	Cha-cha-cha	"Katchi"—Ofenbach	Safe
Tomasz & Natalia	10 (2,6,2)	Tango	"Believer"—Imagine Dragons	Safe
Anna & Michał	22 (6,9,7)	Cha-cha-cha	"I'm Every Woman"—Whitney Houston	Eliminated
Daniel & Paulina	20 (5,8,7)	Quickstep	"Umbrella"—The Baseballs	Safe
Dominika & Wojciech	11 (3,5,3)	Rumba	"Shape of My Heart"—Sting	Eliminated
Sebastian & Janja	22 (6,8,8)	Waltz	"Unchained Melody"—The Righteous Brothers	Safe
Tamara & Rafał	28 (9,10,9)	Tango	"New Rules"—Dua Lipa	Safe
Jakub & Lenka	22 (7,8,7)	Jive	"Don't Stop Me Now"—Queen	Bottom three
Agnieszka & Stefano	22 (6,9,7)	Viennese Waltz	"The Greatest Love of All"—Whitney Houston	Safe
Mariusz & Katarzyna	12 (3,6,3)	Rumba	"I'm Not the Only One"—Sam Smith	Safe
Justyna & Tomasz	11 (2,6,3)	Foxtrot	"Just the Way You Are"—Bruno Mars	Safe
Czadoman & Valeriya	13 (4,6,3)	Jive	"Treat You Better"—Shawn Mendes	Safe

=== Week 3: Integration Trip Night ===
Running order

Couple	Score	Dance	Music	Result
Daniel & Paulina	19 (5,8,6)	Jive	"All About That Bass"—Meghan Trainor	Safe
Agnieszka & Stefano	22 (7,9,6)	Samba	"Shape of You"—Ed Sheeran	Safe
Mariusz & Katarzyna	22 (6,9,7)	Viennese Waltz	"Chodź, przytul, przebacz"—Andrzej Piaseczny	Safe
Tamara & Rafał	26 (8,10,8)	Rumba	"I Want to Know What Love Is"—Foreigner	Safe
Czadoman & Valeriya	20 (5,8,7)	Tango	"Takie tango"—Budka Suflera	Eliminated
Jakub & Lenka	14 (4,6,4)	Cha-cha-cha	"Flames of Love"—Fancy	Bottom two
Joanna & Jan	28 (9,10,9)	Tango	"Don't Be So Shy"—Imany	Safe
Tomasz & Natalia	13 (4,6,3)	Cha-cha-cha	"Celebration"—Kool & the Gang	Safe
Justyna & Tomasz	8 (2,4,2)	Salsa	"Przez twe oczy zielone"—Akcent	Safe
Sebastian & Janja	25 (7,10,8)	Cha-cha-cha	"Moves like Jagger"—Maroon 5 featuring Christina Aguilera	Safe

=== Week 4: Italian Night ===
Running order

Couple	Score	Dance	Music	Result
Mariusz & Katarzyna	23 (7,9,7)	Cha-cha-cha	"Mambo Italiano"—Sophia Loren	Safe
Tomasz & Natalia	16 (5,7,4)	Foxtrot	"L'Italiano"—Toto Cutugno	Safe
Sebastian & Janja	22 (6,9,7)	Argentine Tango	"Love Theme from the Godfather"—Nino Rota	Eliminated
Joanna & Jan	28 (9,10,9)	Samba	"Volare"—Domenico Modugno	Safe
Jakub & Lenka	21 (6,8,7)	Foxtrot	"Felicità"—Al Bano & Romina Power	Bottom two
Agnieszka & Stefano	24 (7,10,7)	Quickstep	"Tu Vuò Fà L'Americano"—Renato Carosone	Safe
Justyna & Tomasz	14 (3,6,5)	Rumba	"Senza una donna"—Zucchero & Paul Young	Safe
Tamara & Rafał	28 (9,10,9)	Samba	"Quando Quando Quando"—Tony Renis & Alberto Testa	Safe
Daniel & Paulina	27 (8,9,10)	Viennese Waltz	"Ti amo"—Umberto Tozzi	Safe

=== Week 5: Animated Films Night ===
Running order

Couple	Score	Dance	Music	Film	Result
Tomasz & Natalia	21 (6,8,7)	Quickstep	"Friend Like Me"—Robin Williams	Aladdin	Safe
Justyna & Tomasz	15 (3,7,5)	Viennese Waltz	"Hedwig's Theme"—John Williams	Harry Potter	Eliminated
Mariusz & Katarzyna	28 (9,10,9)	Jive	"I'm a Believer"—Smash Mouth	Shrek	Safe
Joanna & Jan	24 (7,10,7)	Contemporary	"Mam tę moc"—Katarzyna Łaska	Frozen	Safe
Jakub & Lenka	15 (4,7,4)	Quickstep	"The Bare Necessities"—Phil Harris & Bruce Reitherman	The Jungle Book	Bottom two
Tamara & Rafał	30 (10,10,10)	Contemporary	"Kolorowy wiatr"—Edyta Górniak	Pocahontas	Safe
Daniel & Paulina	18 (5,7,6)	Foxtrot	"Beyond the Sea"—Robbie Williams	Finding Nemo	Safe
Agnieszka & Stefano	26 (8,10,8)	Cha-cha-cha	"Wyginam śmiało ciało"—Jarosław Boberek	Madagascar	Safe

=== Week 6: Hometown Glory ===
Running order

Couple	Score	Dance	Music	Result
Tamara & Rafał	28 (9,10,9)	Waltz	"Imagine"—John Lennon	Safe
Jakub & Lenka	20 (5,8,7)	Salsa	"(I've Had) The Time of My Life"—Bill Medley & Jennifer Warnes	Bottom two
Agnieszka & Stefano	30 (10,10,10)	Contemporary	"Don't Give Up"—Peter Gabriel & Kate Bush	Safe
Mariusz & Katarzyna	24 (7,9,8)	Paso Doble	"Theme from Mission: Impossible"—Lalo Schifrin	Safe
Joanna & Jan	26 (8,10,8)	Rumba	"Kto nie kochał"—Piotr Cugowski	Safe
Tomasz & Natalia	14 (3,6,5)	Salsa	"Bailando"—Enrique Iglesias	Safe
Daniel & Paulina	21 (6,8,7)	Contemporary	"Titanium"—Madilyn Bailey	Eliminated
Tamara & Rafał; Joanna & Jan; Agnieszka & Stefano	28 (9,10,9)	Swing (Girls Group)	"In the Mood"—Glenn Miller	
Daniel & Paulina; Mariusz & Katarzyna; Jakub & Lenka; Tomasz & Natalia	26 (8,10,8)	Boogie-woogie (Boys Group)	"Candyman"—Christina Aguilera	

=== Week 7 ===
Running order

Couple	Score	Dance	Music	Result
Jakub & Lenka	22 (6,9,7)	Paso Doble	"Malagueña"—Ernesto Lecuona	Safe
Mariusz & Katarzyna	19 (5,8,6)	Quickstep	"Despacito"—Luis Fonsi & Daddy Yankee	Safe
Agnieszka & Stefano	22 (6,9,7)	Tango	"Whatever It Takes"—Imagine Dragons	Eliminated
Tomasz & Natalia	20 (6,8,6)	Viennese Waltz	"To, co chciałbym Ci dać"—Pectus	Safe
Tamara & Rafał	23 (7,9,7)	Jive	"Thank You Very Much"—Margaret	Bottom two
Joanna & Jan	24 (7,10,7)	Foxtrot	"Strangers in the Night"—Frank Sinatra	Safe

Dance-offs
Couple	Judges votes	Dance	Music	Result
Tamara & Rafał	Agnieszka, Agnieszka, Tamara	Samba	"Locked Away"—R. City ft. Adam Levine	Loser
Agnieszka & Stefano	Agnieszka, Agnieszka, Tamara	Samba	"Locked Away"—R. City ft. Adam Levine	Winner (3 pts)
Mariusz & Katarzyna	Joanna, Joanna, Joanna	Cha-cha-cha	"Can't Stop The Feeling"—Justin Timberlake	Loser
Joanna & Jan	Joanna, Joanna, Joanna	Cha-cha-cha	"Can't Stop The Feeling"—Justin Timberlake	Winner (3 pts)
Jakub & Lenka	Jakub, Tomasz, Jakub	Jive	"Cheap Thrills"—Sia	Winner (3 pts)
Tomasz & Natalia	Jakub, Tomasz, Jakub	Jive	"Cheap Thrills"—Sia	Loser

=== Week 8: Hollywood Hits Night ===
Running order

Couple	Score	Dance	Music	Result
Mariusz & Katarzyna	21 (6,8,7)	Freestyle	"Indiana Jones Theme"—London Symphony Orchestra	Eliminated
Mariusz & Katarzyna	21 (6,8,7)	Foxtrot	"Story of My Life"—One Direction	Eliminated
Tomasz & Natalia	23 (7,9,7)	Freestyle	"Men in Black"—Will Smith	Safe
Tomasz & Natalia	25 (8,9,8)	Waltz	"Let Her Go"—Passenger	Safe
Jakub & Lenka	20 (6,8,6)	Freestyle	"City of Stars"—Ryan Gosling & Emma Stone	Bottom two
Jakub & Lenka	21 (5,10,6)	Samba	"Let Me Love You"—DJ Snake & Justin Bieber	Bottom two
Joanna & Jan	30 (10,10,10)	Freestyle	"Matrix Revolutions Main Title"—Don Davis	Safe
Joanna & Jan	30 (10,10,10)	Jive	"Ex's & Oh's"—Elle King	Safe
Tamara & Rafał	30 (10,10,10)	Freestyle	"Shallow"—Lady Gaga & Bradley Cooper	Safe
Tamara & Rafał	30 (10,10,10)	Quickstep	"You Can't Hurry Love"—Phil Collins	Safe

=== Week 9: Picnic Night ===
Running order

Couple	Score	Dance	Music	Result
Tamara & Rafał	26 (8,9,9)	Cha-cha-cha	"Wiosna"—Skaldowie	Safe
Tamara & Rafał	29 (9,10,10)	Foxtrot	"Feeling Good"—Nina Simone	Safe
Tomasz & Natalia	21 (6,8,7)	Foxtrot	"Always Look on the Bright Side of Life"—Monty Python	Safe
Tomasz & Natalia	17 (4,7,6)	Samba	"Love Is in the Air"—John Paul Young	Safe
Joanna & Jan	28 (9,10,9)	Samba	"Małgośka"—Maryla Rodowicz	Safe
Joanna & Jan	30 (10,10,10)	Quickstep	"Wiosna – ach to ty!"—Marek Grechuta	Safe
Jakub & Lenka	18 (5,7,6)	Cha-cha-cha	"Maj"—Varius Manx	Eliminated
Jakub & Lenka	23 (7,8,8)	Waltz	"What a Wonderful World"—Louis Armstrong	Eliminated

=== Week 10: Semifinal ===
Running order

Couple	Score	Dance	Music	Result
Tomasz & Natalia	19 (6,8,5)	Paso Doble	"Wrecking Ball"—Miley Cyrus	Bottom two
Tomasz & Natalia	14 (3,6,5)	Cha-cha-cha	"Z Tobą nie umiem wygrać"—Ania Dąbrowska	Bottom two
Joanna & Jan	30 (10,10,10)	Waltz	"What The World Needs Now Is Love"—Jackie DeShannon	Safe
Joanna & Jan	30 (10,10,10)	Rumba	"Zaskakuj mnie"—Marcin Sójka	Safe
Tamara & Rafał	28 (9,10,9)	Paso Doble	"Początek"—Męskie Granie Orkiestra	Bottom two
Tamara & Rafał	29 (9,10,10)	Jive	"Locked Out of Heaven"—Bruno Mars	Bottom two

Dance-off

Running order

Couple	Score	Dance	Music	Result
Tomasz & Natalia	23 (7,9,7)	Quickstep	"Friend Like Me"—Robin Williams	Safe
Tamara & Rafał	30 (10,10,10)	Contemporary	"Kolorowy wiatr"—Edyta Górniak	Third place

=== Week 11: Season Finale ===
Running order

Couple	Score	Dance	Music	Result
Joanna & Jan	38 (9,10,10,9)	Foxtrot	"Strangers in the Night"—Frank Sinatra	Winners
Joanna & Jan	36 (9,10,9,8)	Samba	"Tempo"—Margaret	Winners
Joanna & Jan	40 (10,10,10,10)	Showdance	"Napraw"—LemON	Winners
Tomasz & Natalia	23 (5,7,7,4)	Salsa	"Bailando"—Enrique Iglesias	Runners-up
Tomasz & Natalia	28 (7,8,7,6)	Foxtrot	"Śniadanie do łóżka"—Andrzej Piaseczny	Runners-up
Tomasz & Natalia	31 (8,9,7,7)	Showdance	"Game of Thrones Theme"—Ramin Djawadi	Runners-up

Other Dances

Couple	Dance	Music
Tamara & Rafał	Viennese Waltz	"I Have Nothing"—Whitney Houston
Jakub & Lenka	Viennese Waltz	"I Have Nothing"—Whitney Houston
Mariusz & Katarzyna	Viennese Waltz	"I Have Nothing"—Whitney Houston
Agnieszka & Stefano	Viennese Waltz	"I Have Nothing"—Whitney Houston
Daniel & Paulina	Viennese Waltz	"I Have Nothing"—Whitney Houston
Justyna & Tomasz	Viennese Waltz	"I Have Nothing"—Whitney Houston
Sebastian & Janja	Viennese Waltz	"I Have Nothing"—Whitney Houston
Czadoman & Valeriya	Viennese Waltz	"I Have Nothing"—Whitney Houston
Dominika & Wojciech	Viennese Waltz	"I Have Nothing"—Whitney Houston
Anna & Michał	Viennese Waltz	"I Have Nothing"—Whitney Houston

== Dance chart ==
The celebrities and professional partners danced one of these routines for each corresponding week:

- Week 1 (Season Premiere): Cha-cha-cha, Jive, Tango, Waltz, Viennese Waltz
- Week 2: One unlearned dance (introducing Quickstep, Rumba, Foxtrot)
- Week 3 (Integration Trip Night): One unlearned dance (introducing Salsa, Samba)
- Week 4 (Italian Night): One unlearned dance (introducing Argentine Tango)
- Week 5 (Animated Films Night): One unlearned dance (introducing Contemporary)
- Week 6 (Hometown Glory): One unlearned dance (introducing Paso Doble) and Team Dance (Swing or Boogie-woogie)
- Week 7: One unlearned dance and dance-offs
- Week 8 (Hollywood Hits Night): Freestyle and one unlearned dance
- Week 9 (Picnic Night): One repeated dance and one unlearned dance
- Week 10 (Semifinal): Internet users' choice, one repeated dance and dance offs
- Week 11 (Season Finale): Rivals' choice, couple's favorite dance of the season and Showdance

Couple	1	2	3	4	5	6		7		8		9		10			11		
Joanna & Jan	Viennese Waltz	Cha-cha-cha	Tango	Samba	Contemporary	Rumba	Swing (Group Girls)	Foxtrot	Cha-cha-cha	Freestyle	Jive	Samba	Quickstep	Waltz	Rumba	- (Immunity)	Foxtrot	Samba	Showdance
Tomasz & Natalia	Jive	Tango	Cha-cha-cha	Foxtrot	Quickstep	Salsa	Boogie-woogie (Group Boys)	Viennese Waltz	Jive	Freestyle	Waltz	Foxtrot	Samba	Paso Doble	Cha-cha-cha	Quickstep	Salsa	Foxtrot	Showdance
Tamara & Rafał	Cha-cha-cha	Tango	Rumba	Samba	Contemporary	Waltz	Swing (Group Girls)	Jive	Samba	Freestyle	Quickstep	Cha-cha-cha	Foxtrot	Paso Doble	Jive	Contemporary			Viennese Waltz
Jakub & Lenka	Tango	Jive	Cha-cha-cha	Foxtrot	Quickstep	Salsa	Boogie-woogie (Group Boys)	Paso Doble	Jive	Freestyle	Samba	Cha-cha-cha	Waltz						Viennese Waltz
Mariusz & Katarzyna	Tango	Rumba	Viennese Waltz	Cha-cha-cha	Jive	Paso Doble	Boogie-woogie (Group Boys)	Quickstep	Cha-cha-cha	Freestyle	Foxtrot								Viennese Waltz
Agnieszka & Stefano	Jive	Viennese Waltz	Samba	Quickstep	Cha-cha-cha	Contemporary	Swing (Group Girls)	Tango	Samba										Viennese Waltz
Daniel & Paulina	Cha-cha-cha	Quickstep	Jive	Viennese Waltz	Foxtrot	Contemporary	Boogie-woogie (Group Boys)												Viennese Waltz
Justyna & Tomasz	Cha-cha-cha	Foxtrot	Salsa	Rumba	Viennese Waltz														Viennese Waltz
Sebastian & Janja	Jive	Waltz	Cha-cha-cha	Argentine Tango															Viennese Waltz
Czadoman & Valeriya	Waltz	Jive	Tango																Viennese Waltz
Dominika & Wojciech	Tango	Rumba																	Viennese Waltz
Anna & Michał	Waltz	Cha-cha-cha																	Viennese Waltz

Highest scoring dance
Lowest scoring dance
Performed, but not scored
Bonus points
Gained bonus points for winning this dance-off
Gained no bonus points for losing this dance-off

== Guest performances ==
Date	Artist(s)	Song(s)	Dancers
1 March 2019	Tomasz Szymuś's Orchestra	"I Won't Dance"	All professional dancers, celebrities and judges
1 March 2019	Cleo	"Łowcy gwiazd"	Jakub Kucner and Lenka Klimentová
15 March 2019	Czadoman	"Takie tango"	Czadoman and Valeriya Zhuravlyova
22 March 2019	Stefano Terrazzino	"Bella ciao"	All professional dancers and celebrities
29 March 2019	Czadoman & Antek Scardina	"Ty druha we mnie masz"	All professional dancers and celebrities
29 March 2019	Dawid Kwiatkowski	"Friend Like Me"	Tomasz Działowy and Natalia Głębocka
29 March 2019	Natasza Kotlarska	"Mam tę moc"	Joanna Mazur and Jan Kliment
29 March 2019	Antek Scardina	"Beyond the Sea"	Daniel Kuczaj and Paulina Biernat
29 March 2019	Tomasz Szymuś's Orchestra	Peter Pan medley	All professional dancers and kids' dancers
5 April 2019	Piotr Cugowski	"Kto nie kochał"	Joanna Mazur and Jan Kliment
5 April 2019	Piotr Cugowski	"Zostań ze mną"	–
12 April 2019	Patrycja Runo	"Malagueña"	Jakub Kucner and Lenka Klimentová
12 April 2019	Pectus	"To co chciałbym Ci dać"	Tomasz Działowy and Natalia Głębocka
12 April 2019	Andrzej Grabowski	"Kwestia miesiąca"	–
12 April 2019	Patrycja Runo	"Do tańca i do różańca"	–
26 April 2019	Ewelina Lisowska & Danzel	"Shallow"	Tamara Gonzalez Perea and Rafał Maserak
26 April 2019	Chłopaky & Barbara Kurdej-Szatan	"Havana"	All professional dancers, celebrities and judges
26 April 2019	Danzel	"Pump It Up!"	–
3 May 2019	Tomasz Szymuś's Orchestra	"Happy"	All professional dancers and celebrities
10 May 2019	Marcin Sójka	"Zaskakuj mnie"	Joanna Mazur and Jan Kliment
10 May 2019	Tomasz Szymuś's Orchestra	"Buona Sera"	Massimo Arcolin and Laura Zmajkovičová
10 May 2019	Marcin Sójka	"Dalej"	–
17 May 2019	Tomasz Szymuś's Orchestra	"Yes Sir, I Can Boogie"	All professional dancers, celebrities and judges
17 May 2019	Tomasz Szymuś's Orchestra		Atom Mini
17 May 2019	Tomasz Szymuś's Orchestra		Michał Malitowski's Group
17 May 2019	Margaret	"Tempo"	Joanna Mazur and Jan Kliment
17 May 2019	Andrzej Piaseczny	"Śniadanie do łóżka"	Tomasz Działowy and Natalia Głębocka
17 May 2019	Tomasz Szymuś's Orchestra	"Unsteady"	Luka and Jenalyn
17 May 2019	Edyta Górniak	"I Have Nothing"	All professional dancers and celebrities

== Rating figures ==
Date	Episode	Official rating 4+	Share 4+	Official rating 16–49	Share 16–49	Official rating 16–59	Share 16–59
1 March 2019	1	3 053 228	20,57%	841 146	15,94%	1 380 846	17,14%
8 March 2019	2	2 461 784	17,29%	—N/a	—N/a	—N/a	—N/a
15 March 2019	3	2 506 667	17,04%	—N/a	—N/a	—N/a	—N/a
22 March 2019	4	2 810 446	18,79%	—N/a	—N/a	1 148 802	14,48%
29 March 2019	5	2 439 087	16,63%	—N/a	—N/a	—N/a	—N/a
5 April 2019	6	2 473 422	16,99%	—N/a	—N/a	—N/a	—N/a
12 April 2019	7	2 481 900	16,42%	—N/a	—N/a	—N/a	—N/a
26 April 2019	8			—N/a	—N/a	—N/a	—N/a
3 May 2019	9	2 263 521	15,51%	—N/a	—N/a	—N/a	—N/a
10 May 2019	10	2 275 451	16,11%	—N/a	—N/a	—N/a	—N/a
17 May 2019	11	2 599 730	19,18%	—N/a	—N/a	1 068 000	15,36%
Average	Spring 2019	2 506 601	17,35%	613 188	11,84%	1 016 734	13,20%
