= Wojciech Bonenberg =

Polish architect and educator (born 1950)

Wojciech Bonenberg (born 1950) is a Polish architect and educator.

== Career ==
In 1973, he graduated from the Faculty of Architecture Silesian University of Technology. Then he began to work in a design office "Mostostal" Zabrze, where he worked until 1990. At the same time he worked as an academic teacher at the Silesian University of Technology, then in the Poznań University of Technology and the Academy of Fine Arts in Poznań. He was a head of the Department of Architecture, Employment and Recreation, a director of the Institute of Architecture and Planning in the Poznań University of Technology. From 2002 to 2008, he was a dean of the Faculty of Architecture Poznań University of Technology. In 2003, he received the title of professor.

Author of over 100 designs in the field of public architecture, industrial and residential architecture, including many distinguished and rewarded. He took part in several architectural competitions at home and abroad.

He is a member of the Committee on Architecture and Urban Planning of the Polish Academy of Sciences (PAN), the Society of Architects of the Republic of Poland (SARP), the Society of Polish Urban Planners (TUP) and the Greater Poland Chamber of Architects, as well as the Central Commission for Degrees and Titles.
