= Andrzej Jajszczyk =

- Born: 23 January 1952 (age 74); Dęblin, Poland
- Education: Poznań University of Technology
- Occupations: scientist, academic
- Awards: Knight's Cross of the Order of Polonia Restituta (2017); Prize of the Foundation for Polish Science (2008); IEEE Communications Society Joseph LoCicero Award (2008)

Andrzej Bogdan Jajszczyk (born 23 January 1952) is a Polish professor at the AGH University of Science and Technology in Kraków, Poland, and President of the Kraków Branch of the Polish Academy of Sciences. From 2011 to 2015 he served as the founding Director of the National Science Center. a Polish research funding agency. He graduated from Poznań University of Technology. He was a visiting professor at the University of Adelaide in Australia, Queen's University in Kingston, Ontario, Canada, and Ecole Nationale Supérieure des Télécommunications de Bretagne, France.

== Life and career ==
He was born on 23 January 1952 in Dęblin, Poland. He graduated from the Poznań University of Technology in 1974 and obtained a doctoral degree in 1979 and habilitation in 1986. His major achievements in the theory of connecting networks include reformulation of Benes's theory of rearrangeable networks, complementing the theory by introducing a new class of repackable networks (with G. Jekel) and proving nonblocking properties of a class of multiconnection networks (with F. K. Hwang). He also proposed some new structures of photonic switching networks and networks composed of digital switching matrices. He contributed to the theory of network survivability by adding new metrics and proving some important network properties (with P. Cholda). His accomplishments include definition of new architectures and protocols for flow-aware networks (with J. Domzal and R. Wojcik).

He is a Fellow of the Institute of Electrical and Electronics Engineers (IEEE) for contributions to the theory and practice of telecommunications switching. He was the founding editor of IEEE Global Communications and Editor-in-Chief of IEEE Communications Magazine. He was involved in organization or was an active member of technical program committees of numerous scientific conferences. In 2018, he was General Chair of a flagship IEEE Communications Society conference, IEEE International Conference on Communications ICC '2018, held in Kansas City, Missouri, USA.

He was Associate Editor-in-Chief of China Communications. He served on editorial boards of various reputed journals, including Annales des Télécommunications and Journal of Security and Telecommunications. In 2014 – 2015 he was a member of the Governing Board of Science Europe. He held important positions in IEEE Communications Society, such as: Director of Magazines, Director of Europe, Africa, and Middle East Region, Vice President – Technical Activities. In 2022 - 2024 he was Finance Chair of GLOBECOM/ICC Management & Strategy (GIMS) Standing Committee responsible for the successful conduct, strategic evolution, and policies of the IEEE Global Communications Conference (GLOBECOM) and the IEEE International Conference on Communications (ICC).

He was a chair and co-chair of 13 international scientific conferences, a member of Scientific or Advisory Committees of 32 conferences, and a member of Technical Program Committees of over 100 conferences. He delivered nearly 80 tutorials and invited talks and gave 14 keynote or plenary talks at scientific conferences. Andrzej Jajszczyk is Vice-President of the Kyoto-Krakow Foundation fostering cultural and technical relations between Asia and Poland. In 2008, he was awarded the Foundation for Polish Science Prize, the highest award in Polish science. In January 2017, the European Commission appointed Andrzej Jajszczyk as member of the Scientific Council of the European Research Council (ERC). Since January 2021 he is Vice-President of the ERC. In 2013 he was elected a member of Polish Academy of Sciences and in 2017 a member of Academia Europaea. In 2020 he was elected a member of Polish Academy of Arts and Sciences. Since 2022 he is a member of Springer Nature's European Research Advisory Council

== Selected publications ==
- Introduction to Telecommunication (2007, ISBN 978-83-88309-12-0)
- Multimedia Broadcasting and Multicasting in Mobile Networks (2008, co-author, ISBN 978-0-470-69686-6)
- Proceedings of the IEEE Workshop on IP-oriented Operations & Management IPOM'2000 (2000, co-author, ISBN 83-88309-00-5)
- A Guide to the Wireless Engineering Body of Knowledge (WEBOK), 2nd Edition (2012, editor, ISBN 978-1-118-34357-9)
- Guide to Flow-Aware Networking. Quality-of-Service Architectures and Techniques for Traffic Management (2015, co-author, ISBN 978-3-319-24973-5)

== See also ==
- List of Poles
