= Roman Słowiński =

Polish computer scientist, Vice President of Polish Academy of Sciences

- Born: Roman Słowiński; March 16, 1952 (age 74); Poznań, Poland
- Education: Poznań University of Technology
- Occupation: computer scientist
- Spouse: Teresa Maciejewska
- Children: Jan, Maria, Barbara, Karol
- Awards: Humboldt Research Award (2022); Officier dans l'Ordre des Palmes Academiques (2022); Richard Price Award in Data Science (2021); Scientific Award of the Prime Minister of Poland (2020); Scientific Award of the President of the Polish Academy of Sciences (2016); Prize of the Foundation for Polish Science (2005); Edgeworth-Pareto MCDM Award (1997); EURO Gold Medal (1991)

Roman Słowiński (born 16 March 1952) is a Polish computer scientist and professor. From 2019 to 2022 he was Vice President of the Polish Academy of Sciences.

He is a Professor and Founding Chair of the Laboratory of Intelligent Decision Support Systems at the Institute of Computing Science, Poznań University of Technology, Poland. Since 2003 he is also a professor at the Systems Research Institute of the Polish Academy of Sciences in Warsaw.

His research focuses on the methodology and techniques of intelligent decision support, combining Operational Research and Artificial Intelligence.

== Education and employment ==
Roman Słowiński was born in Poznań, Poland, on 16 March 1952 into the family of Lech Słowiński, a professor of Polish philology, and Melania née Michalska. He earned his undergraduate degree from the Electrical Engineering Faculty of the Poznań University of Technology in 1974, followed by his doctorate (PhD) in 1977, his habilitation (DSc) in 1981. He got the professor title in 1989, and since 1991 he has held the post of Full Professor at the Poznań University of Technology. Since 2003 he also works as a professor at the Systems Research Institute of the Polish Academy of Sciences in Warsaw.

He became a Corresponding Member of the Polish Academy of Sciences in 2004, and an Ordinary Member in 2013. Since 2013 he has been a member of Academia Europaea. In 2024, he was elected as a Foreign Correspondent Academician of the Academy of Sciences of the Institute of Bologna (L'Accademia delle Scienze dell'Istituto di Bologna). In 2011-2018 he held the post of Chairman of the Poznań Branch of the Polish Academy of Sciences. In 2015 he was elected Chairman of the Committee on Computer Science of the Polish Academy of Sciences.

In 2019 he was elected by the General Assembly of the Polish Academy of Sciences to the post of Vice President of the Academy for the 2019–22 term.

Other posts he has held include:

- Deputy Director of the Institute of Automatics, Poznań University of Technology (1984–87),
- Vice Dean of the Electric Faculty, Poznań University of Technology (1987–93),
- head of the Laboratory of Intelligent Decision Support Systems, Institute of Computing Science, Poznań University of Technology (1989-2022),
- professeur en chaire européenne at Paris Dauphine University (2003–09),
- coordinator of the European Work Group for Multiple Criteria Decision Aiding, EURO – Association of European Operational Research Societies (since 2007);
- president (2010-2012) of the International Rough Set Society;
- expert panel member of the European Research Council, PE6-Computer Science (2009–13).

== Research activity ==
Roman Słowiński is a paradigm-creator in the field of intelligent decision support. He has authored or co-authored 14 books and more than 550 research articles, including more than 400 in major scientific journals (Web of Science h=63, Scopus h=71, Google Scholar h=95). He has been the advisor for 28 PhD students, of whom 16 have themselves gone on to become professors. Aside from the Poznań University of Technology, he has also lectured at the Paris Dauphine University, École Centrale Paris, University of Catania, University of Osaka, Yokohama National University, University of Missouri, Laval University in Quebec and several others.

Since 1999 he has been the editor-in-chief of the European Journal of Operational Research . Słowiński's research is on the topic of using rough sets in decision analysis. He started this work in 1983 with the founder of the rough set concept, the late Zdzisław Pawlak, and continued with Salvatore Greco and Benedetto Matarazzo since the early 1990s. He organized the First International Workshop on Rough Set Theory and Applications that took place in Poznań in 1992.

== Non-scientific activity ==
Since 2006 he has been a member of the Social Council to the Metropolitan Archbishop of Poznań; in 2006-2010 he was a board member of the Polish section of the Aid to the Church in Need organization.

== Awards and distinctions ==
Prof. Słowiński has been decorated with the following awards and distinctions:

- the EURO Gold Medal (European Association of Operational Research Societies) – 1991
- the Golden Cross of Merit (1994)
- the F. Edgeworth and V. Pareto Award of the International Society on Multiple Criteria Decision Making, Cape Town (1997)
- the Knight's Cross (2001) and Officer's Cross (2012) of the Polonia Restituta Order
- the title of "Outstanding Personage of Organic Work" (2017) from the Hipolit Cegielski Society (named after the 19th-century Polish positivist Hipolit Cegielski)
- the title of "Distinguished Citizen of the City of Poznań" (2018) from the City Council of Poznań
- IRSS Fellow (International Rough Set Society) – 2015
- IEEE Fellow (The Institute of Electrical and Electronics Engineers) – 2017
- INFORMS Fellow (Institute for Operations Research and the Management Sciences) – 2019
- IFIP Fellow (International Federation for Information Processing) – 2020
- IFORS Fellow (International Federation of Operational Research Societies) – 2022
- IAITQM Fellow (International Academy of Information Technology and Quantitative Management) – 2022
- AAIA Fellow (Asia-Pacific Artificial Intelligence Association) – 2022
- AIIA Fellow (International Artificial Intelligence Industry Alliance) – 2024
- The EURO Award for the Best EJOR Paper in the Theory & Methodology category - 2024

For his scientific activity, he has received numerous awards and honors, including the EURO Gold Medal in 1991, the Foundation for Polish Science Award in 2005, the Humboldt Research Award by Alexander von Humboldt Foundation in 2022, the Prime Minister's Science Award in 2020, the Polish Academy of Sciences Science Award in 2016. In 2003, he received the Scientific Award of the City of Poznań, and in 2018, the title of "Meritorious for the City of Poznań".

He received 6 Honorary Doctorates: from Faculté Polytechnique de Mons (Belgium) in 2000, from Université Paris Dauphine (France) in 2001, from Technical University of Crete (Greece) in 2008, from Nanjing University of Aeronautics and Astronautics (China) in 2018, from Hellenic Mediterranean University (Greece) in 2022, and from University of West Attica (Greece) in 2024.

In 2022, he was promoted by the Prime Minister of France to the rank of "Officier dans l'Ordre des Palmes Academiques" ("Officer in the Order of Academic Palms").
