= List of universities and colleges in Poznań =

Poznań is an important academic center in Poland. It operates here 8 public (state) schools – including 5 universities – and 20 private universities (non-state) (2012). In Poznań there are studying, according to data from 2012, more than 135,000 students.

== Public universities ==
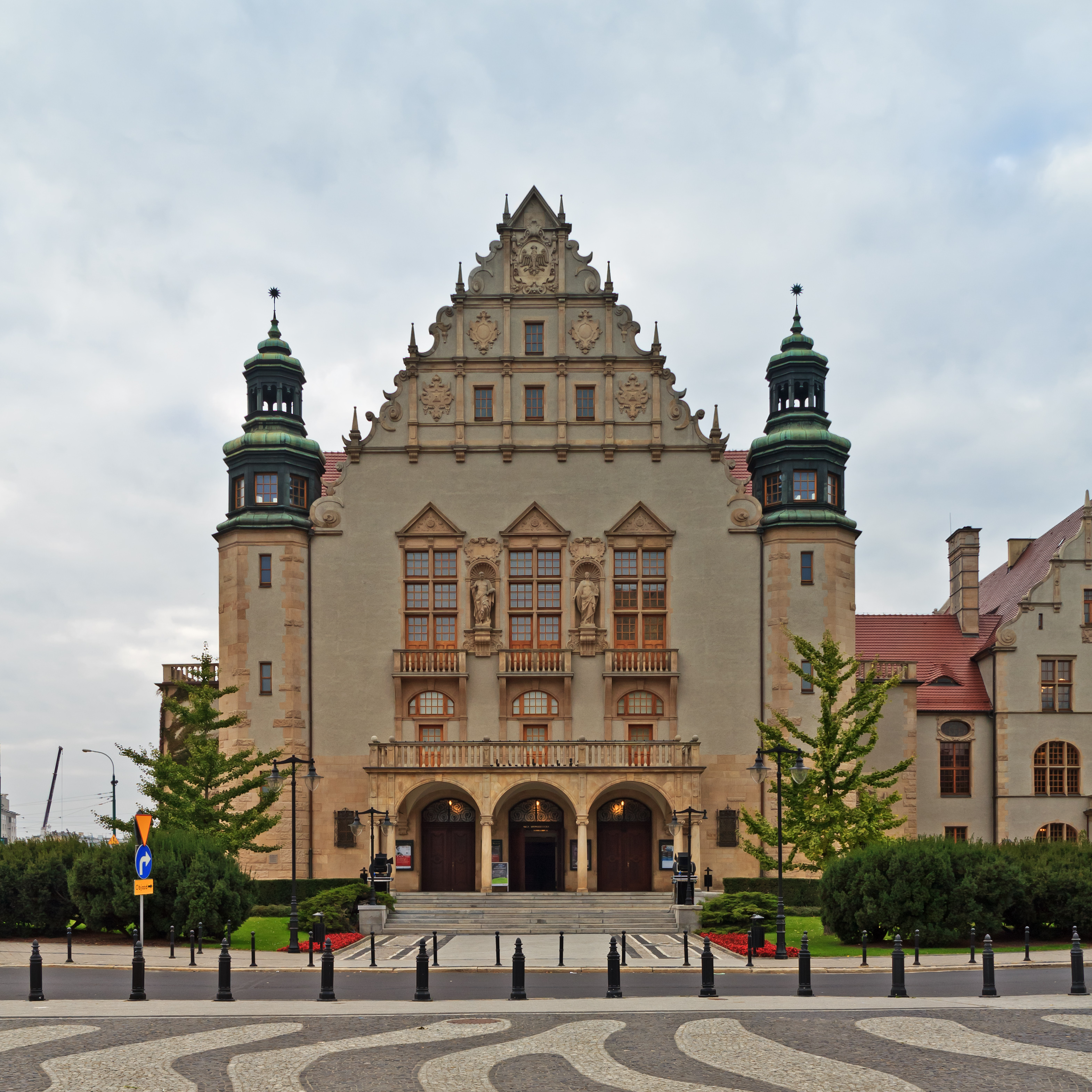
The Collegium Minus – Adam Mickiewicz University

- Adam Mickiewicz University in Poznań
- Poznań University of Technology
- Poznań University of Medical Sciences
- University of Life Sciences in Poznań
- Poznań University of Economics
- University of Fine Arts in Poznań
- Academy of Music named Ignacy Jan Paderewski in Poznań
- Academy of Physical Education named Eugene Piasecki in Poznań

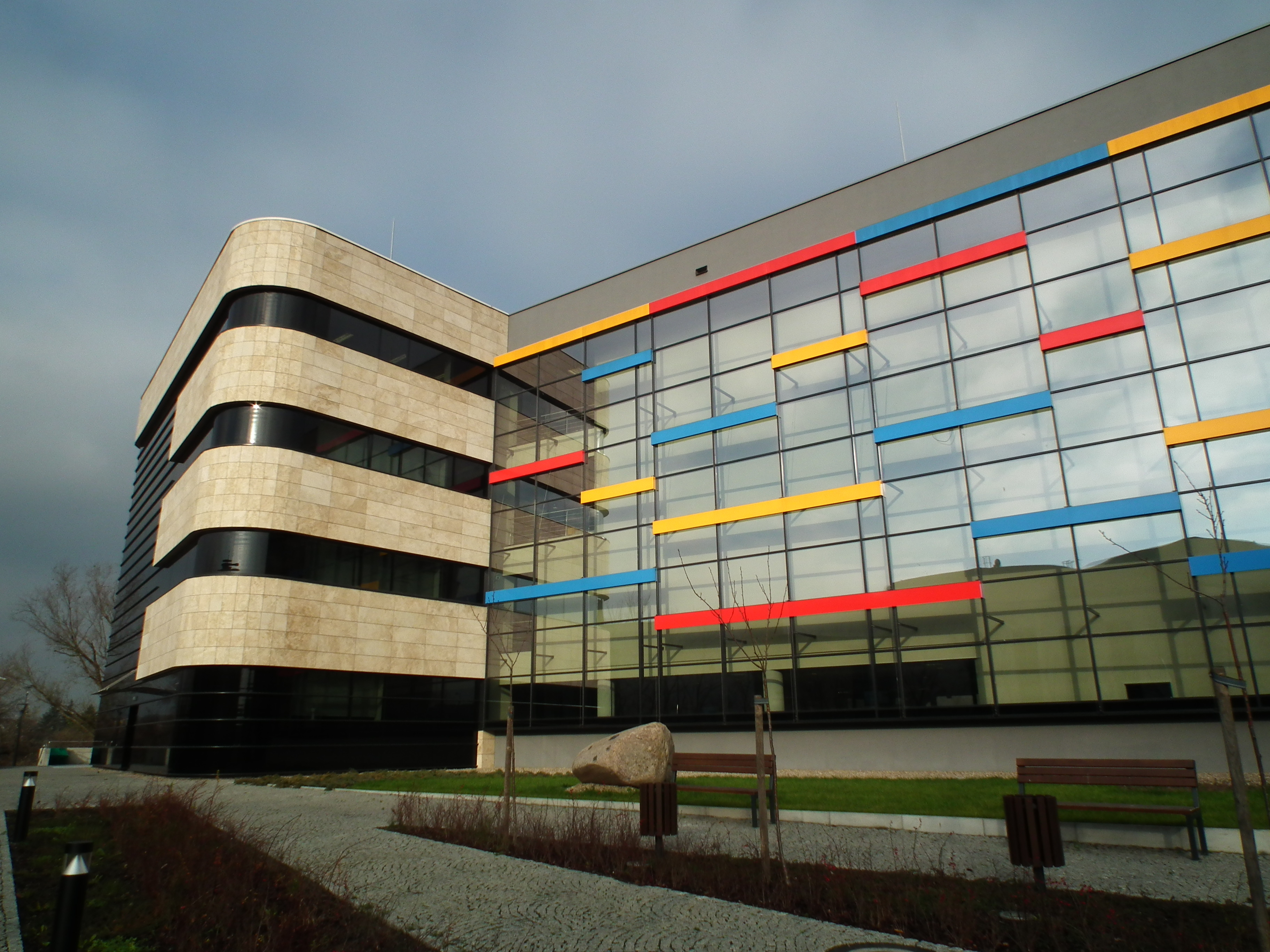
Poznań University of Technology

== Private universities ==
- Archiepiscopal Seminary of Poznań
- Poznań School of Business
- Greater College of Tourism and Management in Poznań
- School of Banking in Poznań
- School Safety in Poznań
- College of Education and Therapy in Poznań
- School Integration and Intercultural Education in Poznań
- College of Commerce and Accountancy
- Higher School of Commerce and Services in Poznań
- College of Hotel and Catering
- College of Foreign Languages named Samuel Bogumil Linde
- School of Communication and Management in Poznań
- School of Logistics
- The School of Humanities and Journalism
- College of Education and Administration named in Poznań
- School of Social Sciences
- School of Management and Banking in Poznań
- Higher Vocational School "Human Resources for Europe" in Poznań
- University of Applied Sciences Health Care and Beauty
- Seminary of the Society of Christ

== Departments fledging private universities ==
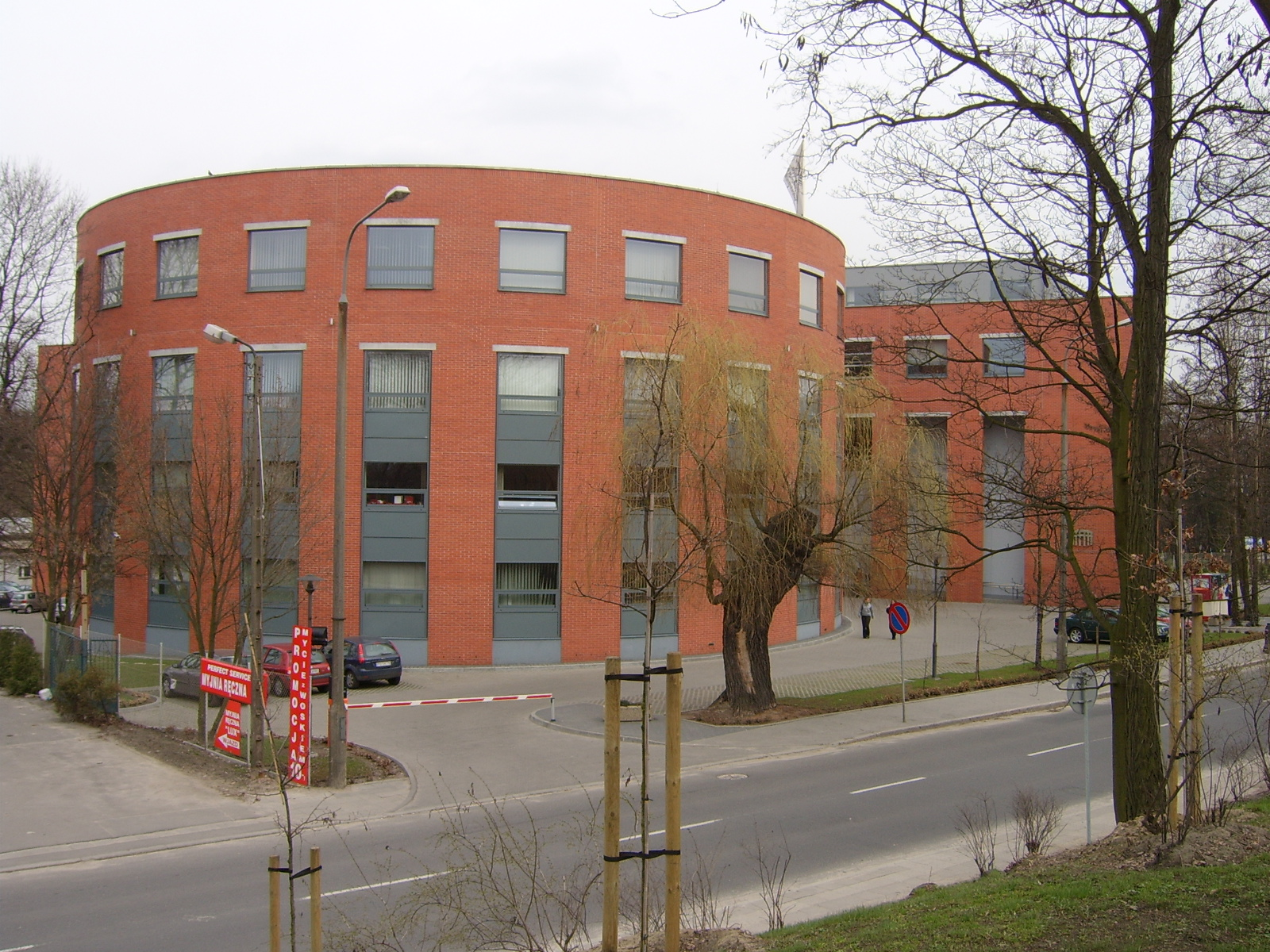
Collegium Da Vinci

- Collegium Humanum – Warsaw Management University
- SWPS University of Social Sciences and Humanities
- SWPS School of Form

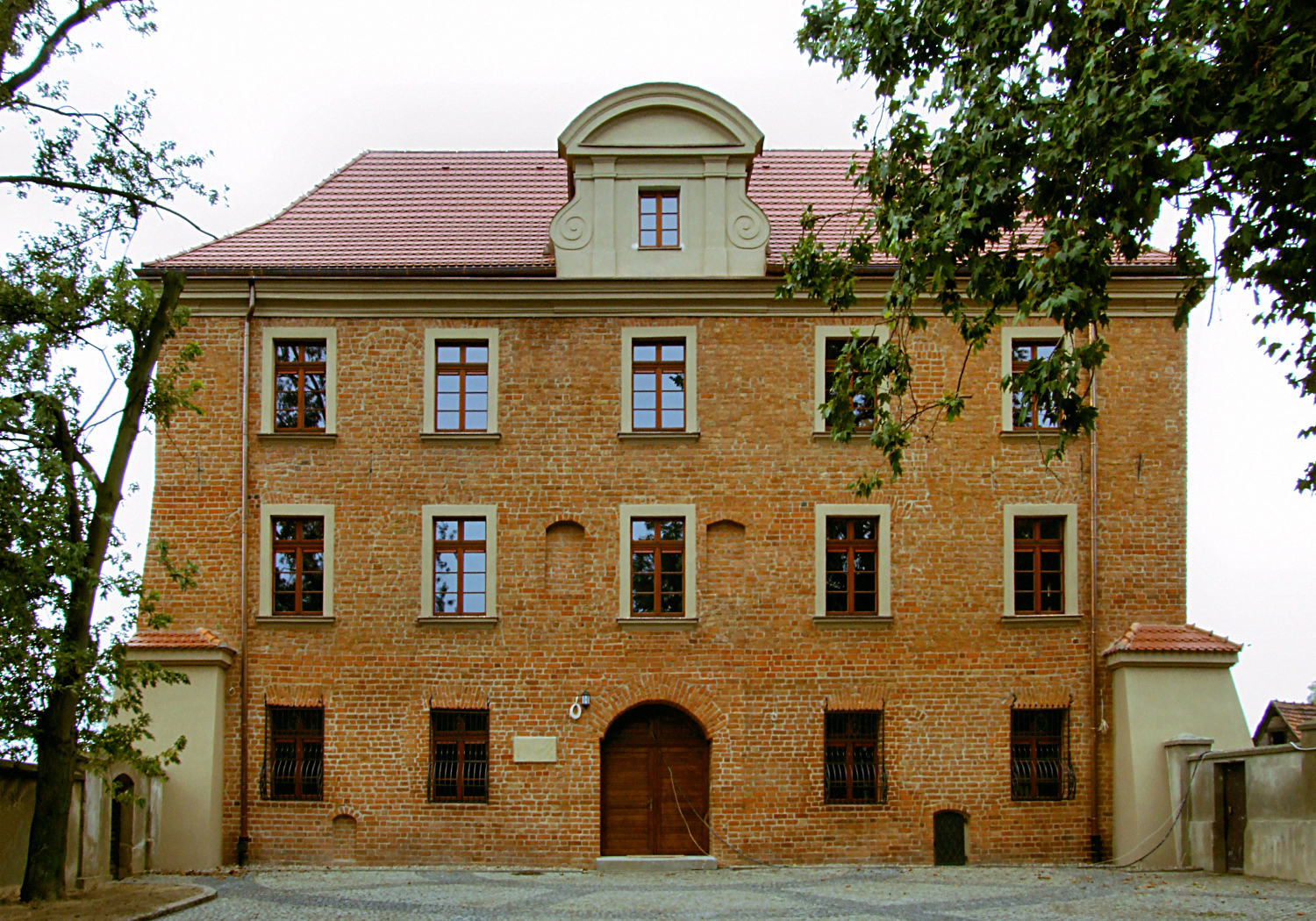
Lubrański Academy

== Historical universities ==
- Lubrański Academy
- Jesuit College in Poznań
- Higher School Officers Armour
- College of Quartermaster Service Officers
- School Officers named Stefan Czarniecki
- School Posnaniensis - College of Applied Arts
