= Masaaki Kijima =

Japanese mathematician

Masaaki Kijima (born 1957) is a Japanese economist and mathematician. The Dean of the School of Informatics and Data Science at Hiroshima University, he has made significant contributions to applied probability and financial engineering. The most familiar of his contributions in the field of applied probability was the development of the G-renewal process. Kijima graduated with a bachelor's degree from the Tokyo Institute of Technology in 1980, then obtained a Ph.D. in business from the University of Rochester in 1986.

== Work ==
Kijima and Sumita were the first to develop the generalized renewal process (GRP). Two years later, Kijima, Morimura, and Suzuki adapted the G-Renewal process to model the failure process of repairable systems with general repair conditions through the notion of the virtual age.

== Published books ==
- Stochastic Processes with Applications to Finance 2nd Edition, Kijima Masaaki, CRC Press LLC, April 2013, ISBN 143988482X
- Stochastic Processes with Applications to Finance, Kijima Masaaki, CRC Press LLC, July 2002, ISBN 1584882247
- Markov Processes for Stochastic Modeling, Kijima Masaaki, Springer, January 1997, ISBN 0412606607

== Selected scholarly papers ==
- Some results for repairable systems with general repair, Masaaki Kijima, Journal of Applied Probability, Vol. 26(1), pages: 89–102, 1989
- Periodical replacement problem without assuming minimal repair, Masaaki Kijima, European Journal of Operational Research, Vol. 37(2), pages: 194–203, 1988
- Economic models for the environmental Kuznets curve: A survey, Journal of Economic Dynamics and Control, Masaaki Kijima, Katsumasa Nishide, Atsuyuki Ohyama, Vol. 34(7), pages: 1187–1201, 2010
- A useful generalization of renewal theory: Counting processes governed by nonnegative Markovian increments, Masaaki Kijima and Ushio Sumita, Journal of Applied Probability, Vol. 23(1), pages: 71–88, 1986
- A Markov chain model for valuing credit risk derivatives, Masaaki Kijima and Katsuya Komoribayashi, Journal of Derivatives, Vol. 6(1), pages: 97–108, 1998
- On the significance of expected shortfall as a coherent risk measure, Masaaki Kijima and Koji Inui, Journal of Banking and Finance, Vol. 29, pages: 853–864, 2005
- A Markovian framework in multi-factor Heath-Jarrow-Morton models, Masaaki Kijima and Koji Inui, Journal of Financial and Quantitative Analysis, Vol. 33(3), pages: 423–440, 1998
- A multi-quality model of interest rates, Masaaki Kijima, Keiichi Tanaka, and Tony Wong, Quantitative Finance, vol. 9(2), pages: 133–145, 2009
