= Rainer Burkard =

Austrian mathematician

Rainer Ernst Burkard (born 28 January 1943, Graz, Austria ) is an Austrian mathematician. His research interests include discrete optimization, graph theory, applied discrete mathematics, and applied number theory.

He earned his Ph.D. from the University of Vienna in 1967 and received his habilitation from the University of Graz in 1971. From 1973–1981 Rainer Burkard was a full professor of Applied Mathematics at the University of Cologne (Germany). Since 1981 Rainer Burkard is a full professor at the Graz University of Technology.

== Positions held ==
- 1984-1986 Vice President of GMÖOR
- 1986-1988 President of the Austrian Society of Operations Research
- 1995-1997 EURO Vice President of IFORS
- 1993-1996 Dean of the Faculty of Science, Graz University of Technology
- 1994-1998 Member of the Council of the European Consortium of Mathematics in Industry
- 1991-2000 Member of the Senate of the Christian Doppler Research Society
- 2001-2002 Vice President of EURO

== Awards ==
- Prize of the Austrian Mathematical Society in 1972
- The Scientific Prize of the Society of Mathematics, Economics and Operations Research in 1991
- The EURO Gold Medal 1997
- Since 1998 Honorary Member of the Hungarian Academy of Sciences
- Since 2011 Honorary Member of the Austrian Society of Operations Research

== Books ==
- Methoden der ganzzahligen Optimierung, Springer Wien, 1972
- with Ulrich Derigs: Assignment and Matching Problems: Solution Methods with FORTRAN- Programs. Lecture Notes in Economics and Mathematical Systems, Band 184, Berlin-New York: Springer 1980.
- Graph Algorithms in Computer Science. HyperCOSTOC Computer Science, Vol. 36, Hofbauer Publ., Wiener Neustadt, 1989.
- With Mauro Dell' Amico and Silvano Martello: Assignment Problems, SIAM, Philadelphia, 2009. ISBN 978-0-89871-663-4
