= Generalized renewal process =

In the mathematical theory of probability, a generalized renewal process (GRP) or G-renewal process is a stochastic point process used to model failure/repair behavior of repairable systems in reliability engineering. Poisson point process is a particular case of GRP.

== Probabilistic model ==
=== Virtual age ===
The G-renewal process is introduced by Kijima and Sumita through the notion of the virtual age.

$y_i = q t_i$

where:
$t_i$ and $y_i$ is real and virtual age (respectively) of the system at/after the i^{th} repair,
$q$ is the restoration factor (a.k.a., repair effectiveness factor),

$q=0$, represents the condition of a perfect repair, where the system age is reset to zero after the repair. This condition corresponds to the Ordinary Renewal Process.
$q=1$, represents the condition of a minimal repair, where the system condition after the repair remains the same as right before the repair. This condition corresponds to the Non-Homogeneous Poisson Process.
$0<q<1$, represents the condition of a general repair, where the system condition is between perfect repair and minimal repair. This condition corresponds to the Generalized Renewal Process.

Kaminskiy and Krivtsov extended the Kijima models by allowing q > 1, so that the repair damages (ages) the system to a higher degree than it was just before the respective failure.

=== G-renewal equation ===
Mathematically, the G-renewal process is quantified through the solution of the G-renewal equation:

$$W(t) = \int_0^t(  g(\tau \mid 0) + \int_0^\tau w(x) \cdot (g(\tau - x \mid x) \,dx  )\,d\tau$$
where,

$g(\tau \mid x) = \frac{(t+qx,\theta)}{1-F(qx,\theta)}$ $t,x \geq 0$
$$w(x) = \frac{dW(x)}{dx}$$
f(t) is the probability density function (PDF) of the underlying failure time distribution,
F(t) is the cumulative distribution function (CDF) of the underlying failure time distribution,
q is the restoration factor,
${\theta}$ is the vector of parameters of the underlying failure-time distribution.

A closed-form solution to the G-renewal equation is not possible. Also, numerical approximations are difficult to obtain due to the recurrent infinite series. A Monte Carlo based approach to solving the G-renewal equation was developed by Kaminiskiy and Krivtsov.

== Statistical estimation ==
The G–renewal process gained its practical popularity in reliability engineering only after methods for estimating its parameters had become available.

=== Monte Carlo approach ===
The nonlinear LSQ estimation of the G–renewal process was first offered by Kaminskiy & Krivtsov. A random inter-arrival time from a parameterized G-Renewal process is given by:

$$X_i = F^{-1} (1-U_i[1- F(qS_{i-1})]) - qS_{i-1}$$
where,

$S_{i-1}$ is the cumulative real age before the i^{th} inter-arrival,
$U_i$ is a uniformly distributed random variable,
$F$ is the CDF of the underlying failure-time distribution.

The Monte Carlo solution was subsequently improved and implemented as a web resource.

=== Maximum likelihood approach ===
The maximum likelihood procedures were subsequently discussed by Yañez, et al., and Mettas & Zhao. The estimation of the G–renewal restoration factor was addressed in detail by Kahle & Love.

=== Regularization method in estimating GRP parameters ===
The estimation of G–renewal process parameters is an ill–posed inverse problem, and therefore, the solution may not be unique and is sensitive to the input data. Krivtsov & Yevkin suggested first to estimate the underlying distribution parameters using the time to first failures only. Then, the obtained parameters are used as the initial values for the second step, whereat all model parameters (including the restoration factor(s)) are estimated simultaneously. This approach allows, on the one hand, to avoid irrelevant solutions (wrong local maximums or minimums of the objective function) and on the other hand, to improve computational speed, as the number of iterations significantly depends on the selected initial values.

== Limitations ==
One limitation of the Generalized Renewal Process is that it cannot account for "better-than-new" repair. The G1-renewal process has been developed which applies the restoration factor to the life parameter of a location-scale distribution to be able to account for "better-than-new" repair in addition to other repair types.
