= Faculty of Architecture Poznań University of Technology =

Coordinates: 52°25′00″N 16°58′53″E

- Type: Faculty
- Established: 1950 (1999)
- President: Ewa Pruszewicz-Sipińska
- Location: Poznań, Greater Poland Voivodeship, Poland
- Website: http://architektura.put.poznan.pl/n/

The Faculty of Architecture Poznań University of Technology (Pl. Wydział Architektury Politechniki Poznańskiej) is one of the schools of architecture in Poland. It was founded in 1950, existed until 1954. The founder was Władysław Czarnecki. In 1999 the faculty was revived by Robert Ast.

Departments:

- Department of Architecture of the Services and Housing
- Institute of Architecture and Planning
- Department of Drawing, Painting, Sculpture

List of presidents:

- Władysław Czarnecki (1950-1954)
- Robert Ast (1999-2002)
- Wojciech Bonenberg (2002-2008)
- Jerzy Suchanek (2008-2016)
- Ewa Pruszewicz-Sipińska (2016-)
