= University of Life Sciences in Poznań =

Poznań University of Life Sciences

Coordinates: 52°25′32″N 16°54′23″E

Poznań University of Life Sciences
- Uniwersytet Przyrodniczy w Poznaniu
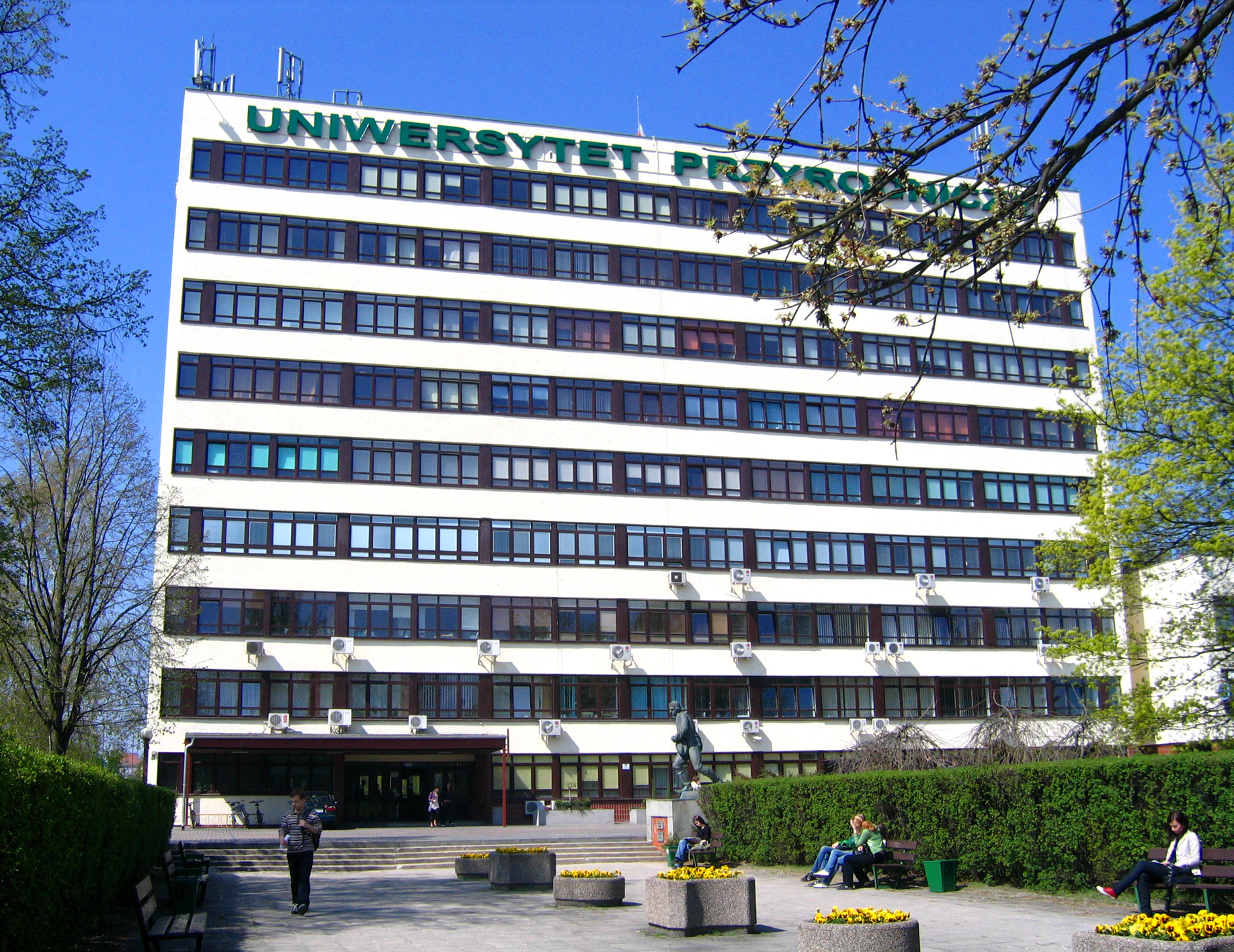
- Latin: Universitas Rerum Naturalium Posnaniensis
- Type: Public
- Established: 1919; 106 years ago
- Rector: Prof. Krzysztof Szoszkiewicz
- Students: 6,791 (12.2023)
- Address: ul. Wojska Polskiego 28; 60-637 Poznań, Greater Poland Voivodeship, Poland
- Campus: Urban
- Website: www.puls.edu.pl

University rankings

Global – Overall
- CWTS World: 521-530 (2023)

Regional – Overall
- QS Emerging Europe and Central Asia: 114 (2022)

The University of Life Sciences in Poznań (Polish: Uniwersytet Przyrodniczy w Poznaniu, literally "University of Nature in Poznań") is a higher-education institution in Poznań, Poland. It officially gained university status on 11 April 2008. Its previous name was Akademia Rolnicza im. Augusta Cieszkowskiego w Poznaniu, literally "August Cieszkowski Agricultural Academy in Poznań", although it styled itself in English as "The August Cieszkowski Agricultural University of Poznań".

The institution was established in 1951 from Agriculture and Forestry faculties which had existed since 1919 at Adam Mickiewicz University.

The university has faculties of Agronomy, Forestry, Animal Breeding and Biology, Wood Technology, Horticulture, Food Science and Nutrition, Land Reclamation and Environmental Engineering, and Economics and Social Sciences.

== See also ==
- List of forestry universities and colleges
- List of universities and colleges in Poznań
