= Jakub Kucner =

Polish male fashion model, actor, TV presenter, trainer and activist

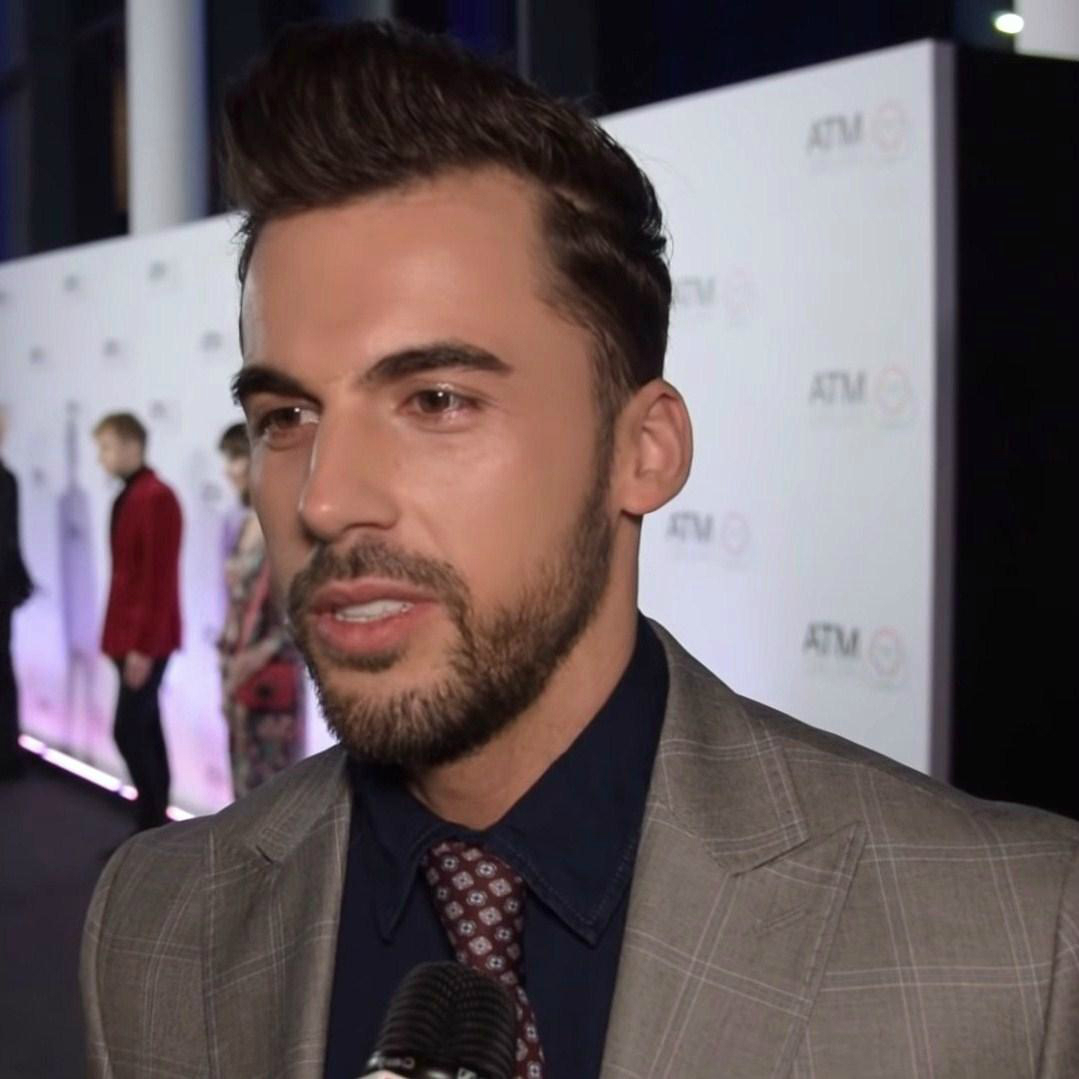
- Jakub in 2017
- Born: March 28, 1988 (age 38); Poznań, Poland
- Modeling information
- Height: 183 cm (6 ft)
- Hair color: Brown
- Eye color: Brown

Jakub Kucner (born 28 March 1988, Poznań) is a Polish fashion model, actor, television presenter, personal trainer, social activist and Mister Poland 2017.

== Life and career ==
He was born on 28 March 1988 in Poznań. He graduated in cultural studies from the Collegium Da Vinci in Poznań. He also completed an acting course. Before pursuing a career in media and modelling he had worked at a sales department of a fitness club. He subsequently became a personal trainer. He appeared in such TV series as Barwy szczęścia (2013), Na sygnale (2016), Lekarze na start (2017), Zawsze warto (2019) and M jak miłość (2019). In 2017, he won the title of Mister Poland. In 2018, he represented Poland at the Mister Global in Thailand. He reached the final and received the title of II Vice-Mister Global 2018.

In 2019, he took part in an entertainment show broadcast on Polsat Channel Dancing with the Stars: Taniec z gwiazdami.

== Personal life ==
He has a younger sister, Judyta. He practiced rowing and played football at high school. He was in a relationship with model Karolina Zagozdon, whom he met during auditions for the Mister Poland beauty pageant. He is known for his involvement in charity campaigns. He has collaborated with the Mali Bracia Ubodzy Association and has taken part in humanitarian missions in Gambia. In 2018, he and Karolina Zagozdon set up the "Power Changers" foundation which helps fight poverty in African countries.

== See also ==
- Male modeling
- List of Poles
