= EURO Gold Medal =

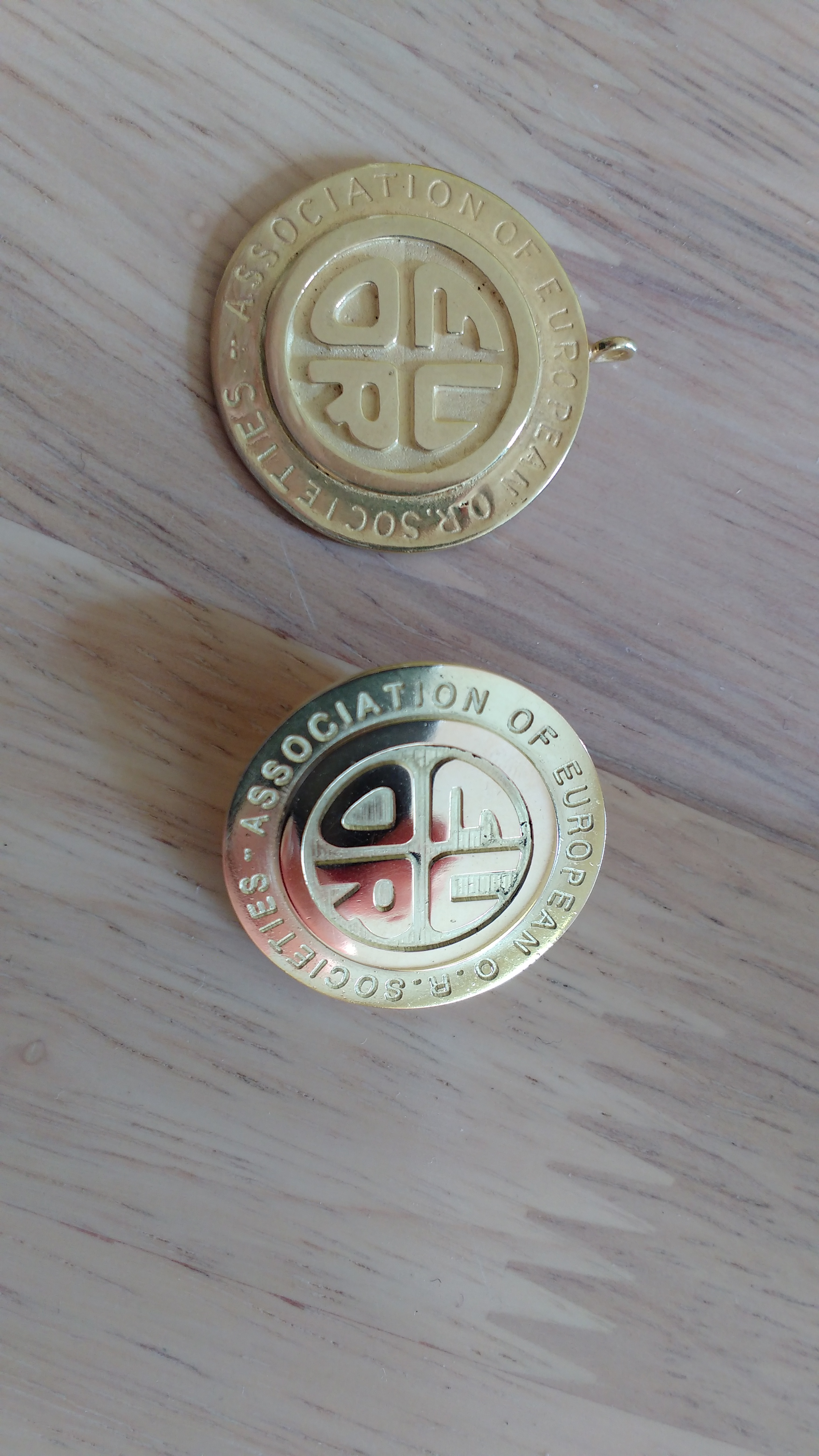
- Awarded for: Outstanding contributions to the development of Operations Research
- First award: 1985
- Website: https://www.euro-online.org/web/pages/212/gold-medal-egm

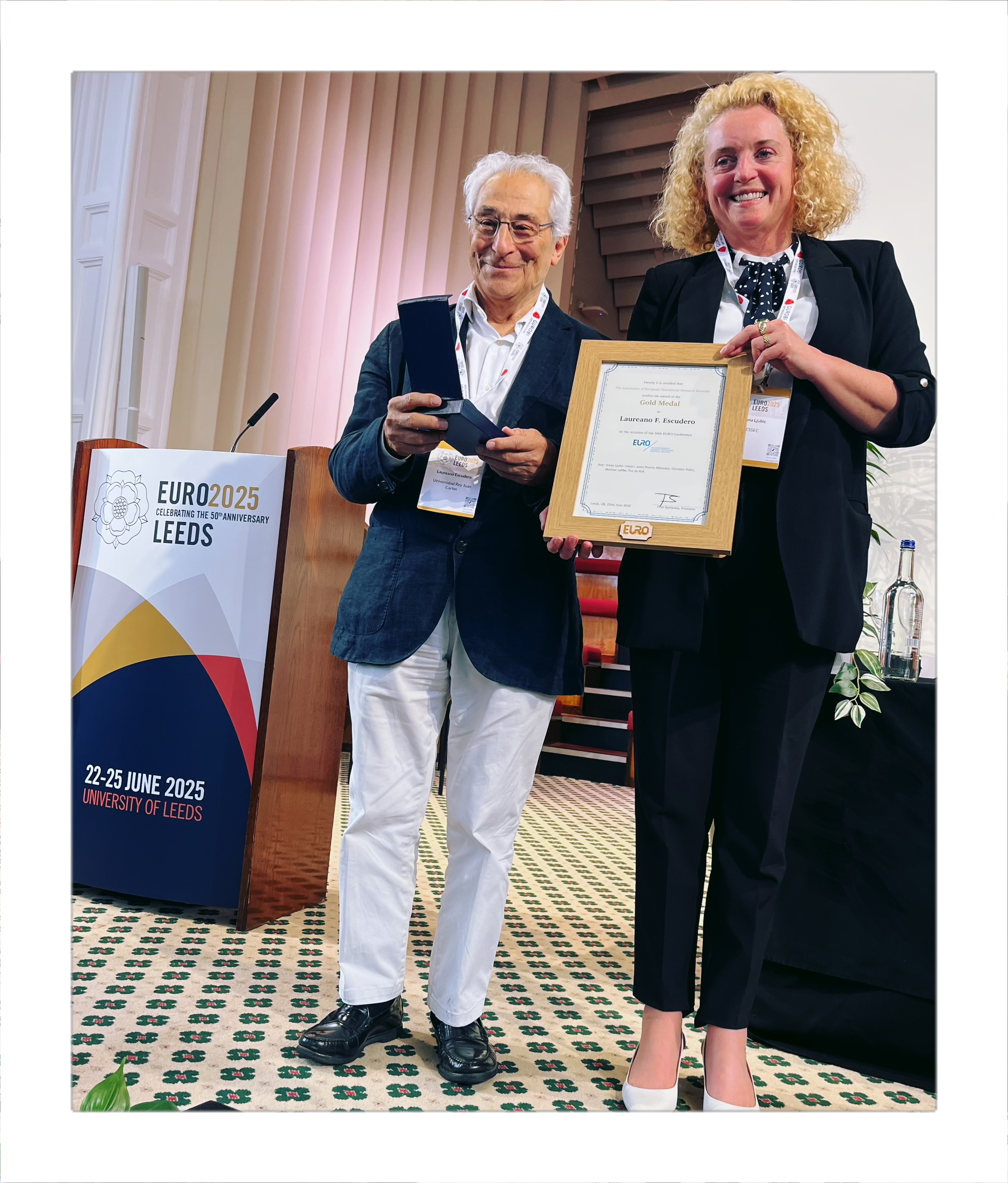
Prof. Laureano Escudero (left) receives the EURO Gold Medal 2025—the highest distinction in Operational Research in Europe—for his outstanding contribution to OR science. The award was presented by the Chair of the Jury, Ivana Ljubić (right), during the Opening Ceremony of the 34th European Conference on Operational Research, held in 2025 in Leeds.

The EURO Gold medal of the Association of European Operational Research Societies (EURO) is the highest distinction within Operations Research (OR) in Europe. The prize was first awarded to Hans-Jürgen Zimmermann in 1985.

The medal is awarded at EURO-k Conferences, which usually take place twice every three years. It is granted to an individual or a group for an outstanding contribution to the field of Operations Research. The Prize is intended to reflect contributions that have stood the test of time, and hence it is awarded for a body of work, rather than a single piece. The award is a medal in gold, a diploma, and a fee waiver for all future EURO-k conferences.

== List of recipients ==
- 2025 Laureano F. Escudero
- 2024 M. Grazia Speranza
- 2022 Gilbert Laporte
- 2021 Ailsa Land (posthumously)
- 2019 Martine Labbé
- 2018 Silvano Martello
- 2016 Yurii Nesterov and Maurice Queyranne
- 2015 Alexander Schrijver
- 2013 Panos M. Pardalos
- 2012 Boris Polyak
- 2010 Rolf Möhring
- 2009 Jacques Benders and Frank Kelly
- 2007 Aharon Ben-Tal
- 2006 Luk Van Wassenhove
- 2004 Martin Grötschel
- 2003 András Prékopa
- 2001 Egon Balas
- 1998 Paolo Toth
- 1997 Rainer Burkard and Jan Karel Lenstra
- 1995 Dominique de Werra
- 1994 Jean-Pierre Brans and Laurence Wolsey
- 1992 Bernard Roy
- 1991 Jacek Błażewicz, Roman Słowiński, and Jan Węglarz
- 1989 Claude Berge
- 1988 Martin Beale (posthumously)
- 1986 Pierre Hansen and Alexander Rinnooy Kan
- 1985 Hans-Jürgen Zimmermann
