= Paolo Toth =

Italian electronic engineer

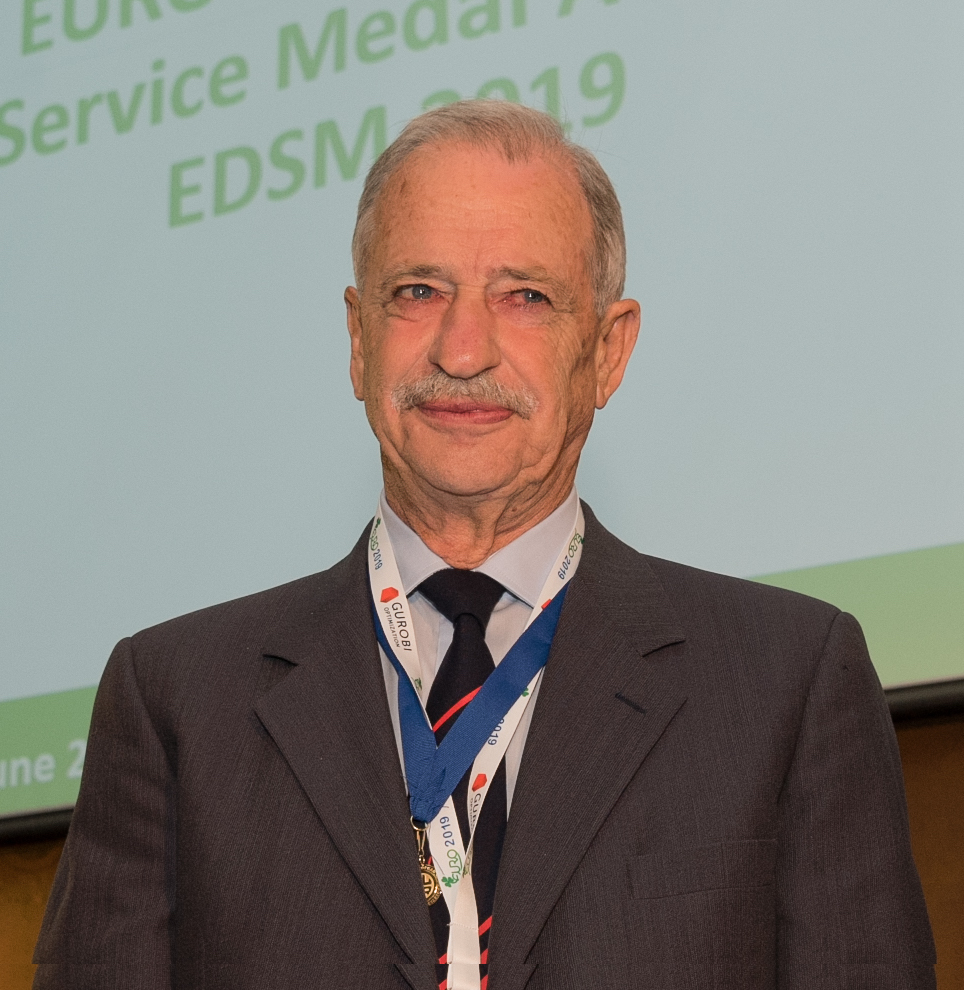
- Paolo Toth in 2019
- Born: 29 December 1941 (age 84); Zara, Italy (currently Zadar, Croatia)
- Title: Emeritus Professor
- Board member of: IFORS, EURO, AIRO
- Awards: EURO Gold Medal, Robert Herman Lifetime Achievement, INFORMS Fellow, EURO Distinguished Service Award, Harold Larnder Prize

Academic background
- Education: University of Bologna

Academic work
- Discipline: Operations Research
- Sub-discipline: Combinatorial Optimization
- Institutions: University of Bologna
- Notable students: Daniele Vigo, Andrea Lodi
- Main interests: Vehicle Routing, Knapsack Problem, Set Covering, Vertex Coloring
- Notable works: Knapsack problems: Algorithms and Computer implementations; Vehicle Routing: Problems, Methods, and Applications
- Website: https://www.unibo.it/sitoweb/paolo.toth/en

Paolo Toth (born 29 December 1941 in Zara, Italy) is an Italian scientist and engineer, and an Emeritus Professor of Operations Research at the University of Bologna. He is known for his research in operations research and mathematical programming. He made significant contributions in the areas of vehicle routing, knapsack and other cutting and packing problems, train scheduling, set covering, vertex coloring and, in general, combinatorial optimization. As of 2023, he published over 170 peer-reviewed articles and was cited more than 10,000 times.

He was President of the Italian Operations Research Society (AIRO) from 1988 to 1995, of the Association of European Operational Research Societies (EURO) from 1995 to 1996, and of the International Federation of Operational Research Societies (IFORS) from 2001 to 2003.

Among his PhD students are Andrew H. and Ann R. Tisch Professor Andrea Lodi (Cornell Tech), and Professor Daniele Vigo (University of Bologna).

== Education and early career ==
Toth graduated from the University of Bologna with a degree in Electronic Engineering in 1965. He was an assistant and associate professor of computer science at the University of Bologna from 1968 to 1980. From 1980 to 1983, he was a full professor of Automatic Control at the University of Florence, before returning to the University of Bologna as a full professor of combinatorial optimization.

== Awards ==
- 1998 - EURO Gold Medal from the Association of European Operational Research Societies.
- 1998 - Harold Larnder Prize from the Canadian Operational Research Society.
- 2003 - Honorary Doctorate in Operational Research from the University of Montreal.
- 2005 - Robert Herman Lifetime Achievement Award from Institute for Operations Research and the Management Sciences.
- 2012 - IFORS Distinguished Lectures from International Federation of Operational Research Societies.
- 2016 - INFORMS Elected Fellows from Institute for Operations Research and the Management Sciences.
- 2019 - EURO Distinguished Service Award from Association of European Operational Research Societies.

== Books ==
He is the co-author, with Silvano Martello, of the book Knapsack problems: Algorithms and Computer implementations (John Wiley & Sons, Inc., 1990) and is also the co-author, with Daniele Vigo, of the book Vehicle Routing: Problems, Methods, and Applications (Society for Industrial and Applied Mathematics, 2014)
