= European Journal of Operational Research =

- Discipline: Operational research
- Language: English
- Edited by: Roman Słowiński; Emanuele Borgonovo; José-Fernando Oliveira; Steffen Rebennack; Ruud Teunter; Mike Yearworth

Publication details
- History: 1977–present
- Publisher: Elsevier on behalf of the Association of European Operational Research Societies
- Frequency: 24/year
- Impact factor: 6.0 (2024)

Standard abbreviations
- ISO 4: Eur. J. Oper. Res.
- MathSciNet: European J. Oper. Res.

Indexing
- CODEN: EJORDT
- ISSN: 0377-2217
- LCCN: 77643872

Links
- Journal homepage

The European Journal of Operational Research (EJOR) is a peer-reviewed academic journal in operational research. It was founded in 1977 by the Association of European Operational Research Societies, and is published by Elsevier, with Roman Słowiński as its Co-ordinating Editor-in-Chief. Currently, it publishes at a rate of 24 issues per annual volume, with approximately 250 pages per issue.

It is a top journal (CABS 4; ABDC A*) and the primary journal for Europe-based studies of operational research. It is the world's largest operational research journal. For most years since 1999 it has been ranked by SCImago Journal Rank as a top-quartile journal in information systems and management, management science and operational research, and modelling and simulation.
