= Poznań University of Technology =

Technical university in Poznań, Poland

Coordinates: 52.3942°N 16.9183°E

- Politechnika Poznańska
- Latin: Polytechnica Posnaniensis
- Motto: Technologies in a positive climate
- Type: Public
- Established: 1955 (1919)
- Affiliations: CESAER, ERASMUS, EUA, EAIE, SEFI, LEONET
- Rector: PhD, Prof. Teofil Jesionowski
- Students: 14,138 (12.2023)
- Location: ul. Jacka Rychlewskiego 1; 61-131 Poznań, Poznań, Greater Poland Voivodeship, Poland
- Campus: Piotrowo, Nieszawska
- Website: put.poznan.pl

University rankings

Regional – Overall
- QS Emerging Europe and Central Asia: 85 (2022)

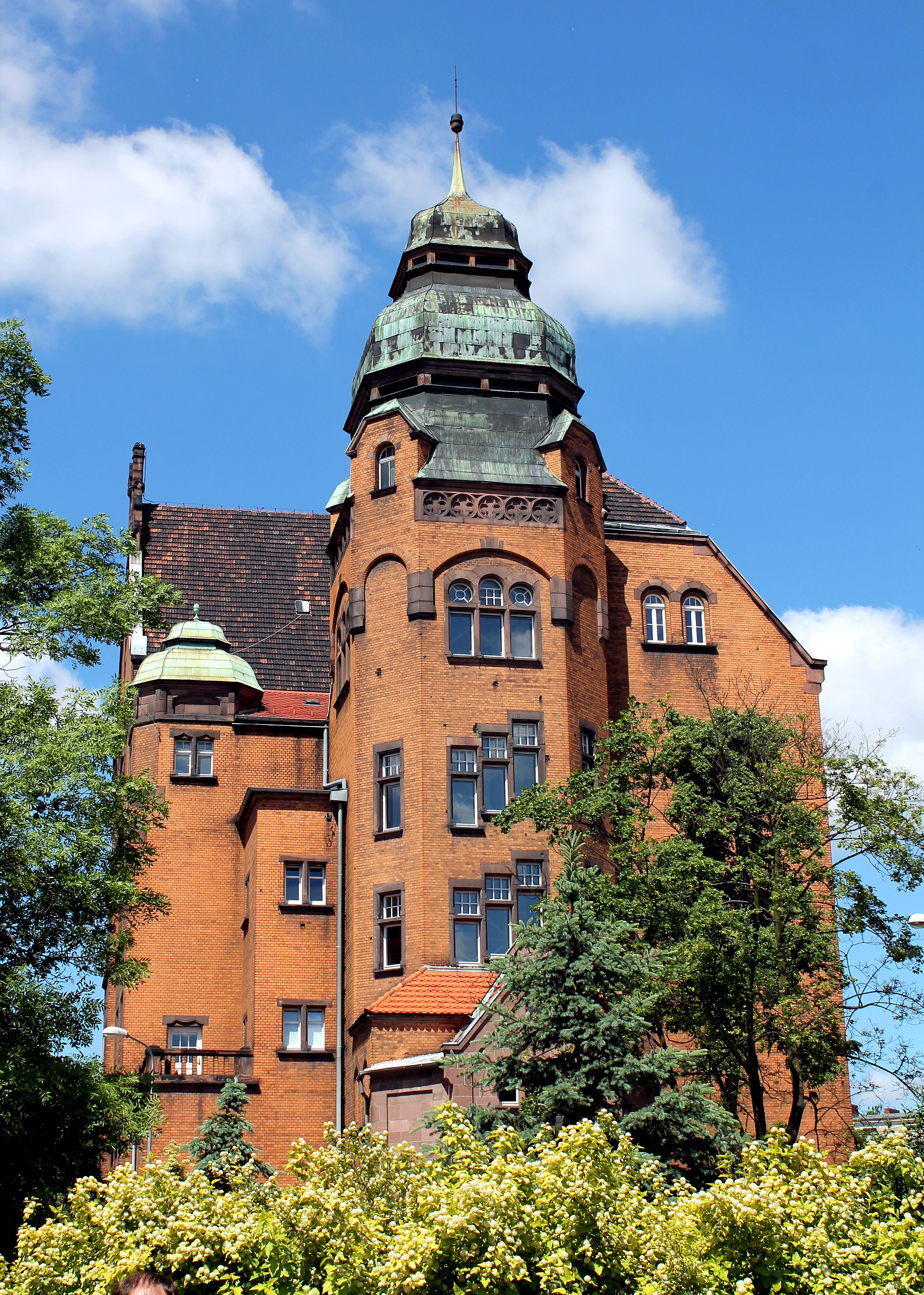
Rector's Office

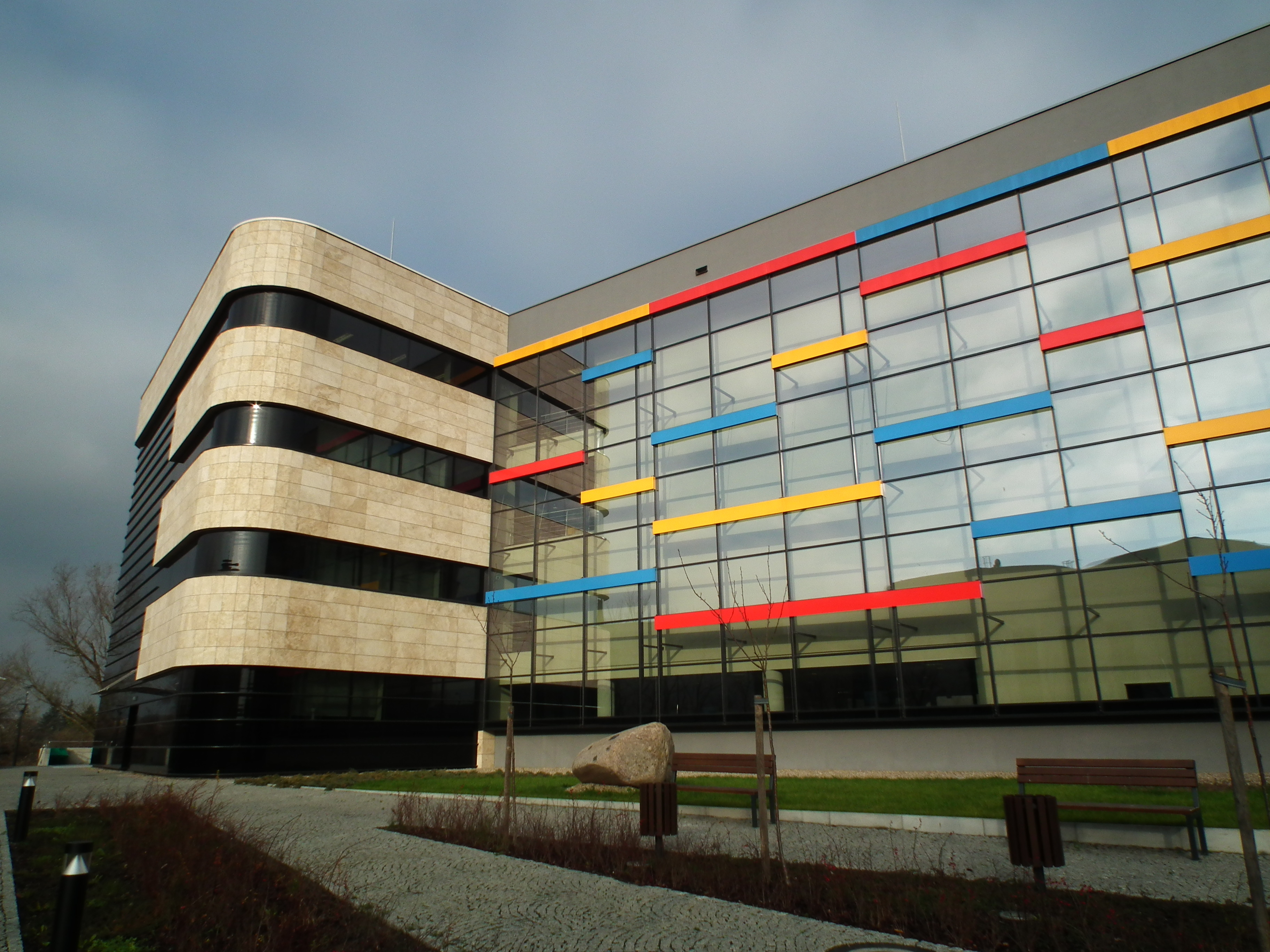
Faculty of Chemical Technology

Poznań University of Technology, PUT (Polish: Politechnika Poznańska) is a university in Poznań, Poland. Poznań University of Technology is known as one of the best technical universities in Poland. URAP ranked PUT among the top 6% of world universities and Webometrics ranked it at no. 842 in the world by Google citations for the year 2015. In 1995, it became the first Polish university to become a member of the Conference of European Schools for Advanced Engineering Education and Research (CESAER), an organization comprising the best technical universities in Europe. The university is also a member of the Socrates-Erasmus programme for exchange students from all over Europe, promoting advanced engineering and a European dimension. The university is home to many organizations and student circles, and the radio station Afera 98.6 MHz. The university has over 21,000 students and over 1,100 academic staff.

== Faculties ==
There are nine faculties (since 2020):

- Architecture
- Automatic Control, Robotics and Electrical Engineering
- Chemical Technology
- Computing and Telecommunications
- Civil and Transport Engineering
- Materials Engineering and Technical Physics
- Mechanical Engineering
- Environmental Engineering and Energy
- Engineering Management

== History ==
Poznan University of Technology (PUT) was officially founded in 1955 and the first rector was Roman Kozak. But a state school had existed in Poznań since 1919, named the Higher State School of Machinery. After adding a second department in 1929, its name was changed to the Higher State School of Machinery and Electrotechnics. It was supposed to become the University of Technology in 1940, but its development was interrupted by World War II. In 1945 the school received the status of Higher Engineering School and in 1955 it became the University of Technology.

In 1999 PUT celebrated the 80th anniversary of the higher educational technical system in Poznan. It continues traditions of the State Higher School of Mechanical Engineering, which was opened in August 1919. The school remained open at the outbreak of the Second World War, during which time 716 graduates had completed their studies there. It was allocated in a building nowadays situated at Marie Skłodowska-Curie Square, today the Rector's Office. In 1929, the school changed its name to the State Higher School of Mechanical and Electrical Engineering. As a result of further development, the Higher School was to be given the status of a university in 1940. This did not occur during the war period. In September 1945, the school received the title High School of Engineering, and ten years later, it became Poznan University of Technology.

PUT is now an autonomous state institution consisting of nine faculties, with over one thousand academic staff members and over fourteen thousand students, both full-time and part-time. PUT has been granted the right to confer doctorates in technical science. Moreover, it runs postgraduate studies within different faculties.

In 1995, PUT, as the first Polish University of Technology, became a member of the Conference of European Schools for Advanced Engineering Education and Research – CESAER-bringing together the best European Engineering Colleges and Universities of Technology. In 1999 PUT was the host organization of the IX CESAER Conference.

In the academic year 1999 / 2000 European Credit Transfer System –ECTS-was introduced at the PUT.

From the academic year 2006/2007, Poznan University of Technology also conducts its existing doctoral studies as third-cycle studies.

On 1 January 2026 PUT changed its address to the new rectorate building at the Piotrowo campus.

== Successes ==
Students from the Faculty of Computer Science started few times in CSIDC computer systems projecting world championships organised by Institute of Electrical and Electronics Engineers (IEEE) Computer Society and ImagineCup (Microsoft). Four different teams in 2001–2006 managed by Doctor of Engineering Jan Kniat were three-time world champions. Many graduates from Computer science and Management faculty work in Microsoft corporation in Redmond, Washington, US. PUT is a member of CESAER Association and was the first Polish technical university to receive membership of that organisation.

== Notable alumni ==
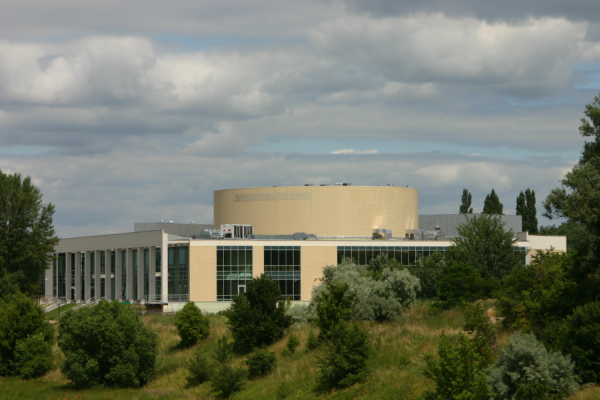
Conference Hall of the Poznań University of Technology

- Paweł Arndt (b. 1954), politician
- Jacek Błażewicz (b. 1951), computer scientist
- Janusz Centka (b. 1950), glider pilot, winner of three World Gliding Championships
- Witold Czarnecki (b. 1953), politician
- Aleksander Doba (b. 1946), explorer, traveller
- Waldy Dzikowski (b. 1959), politician
- Andrzej Jajszczyk (b. 1952), scientist, academic
- Fiann Paul (b. 1980), ocean rower
- Roman Słowiński (b. 1952), computer scientist, academic
- Piotr Szczerek (b. 1975), entrepreneur, CEO of the Drogbruk paving company
- Jan Węglarz (b. 1947), computer scientist

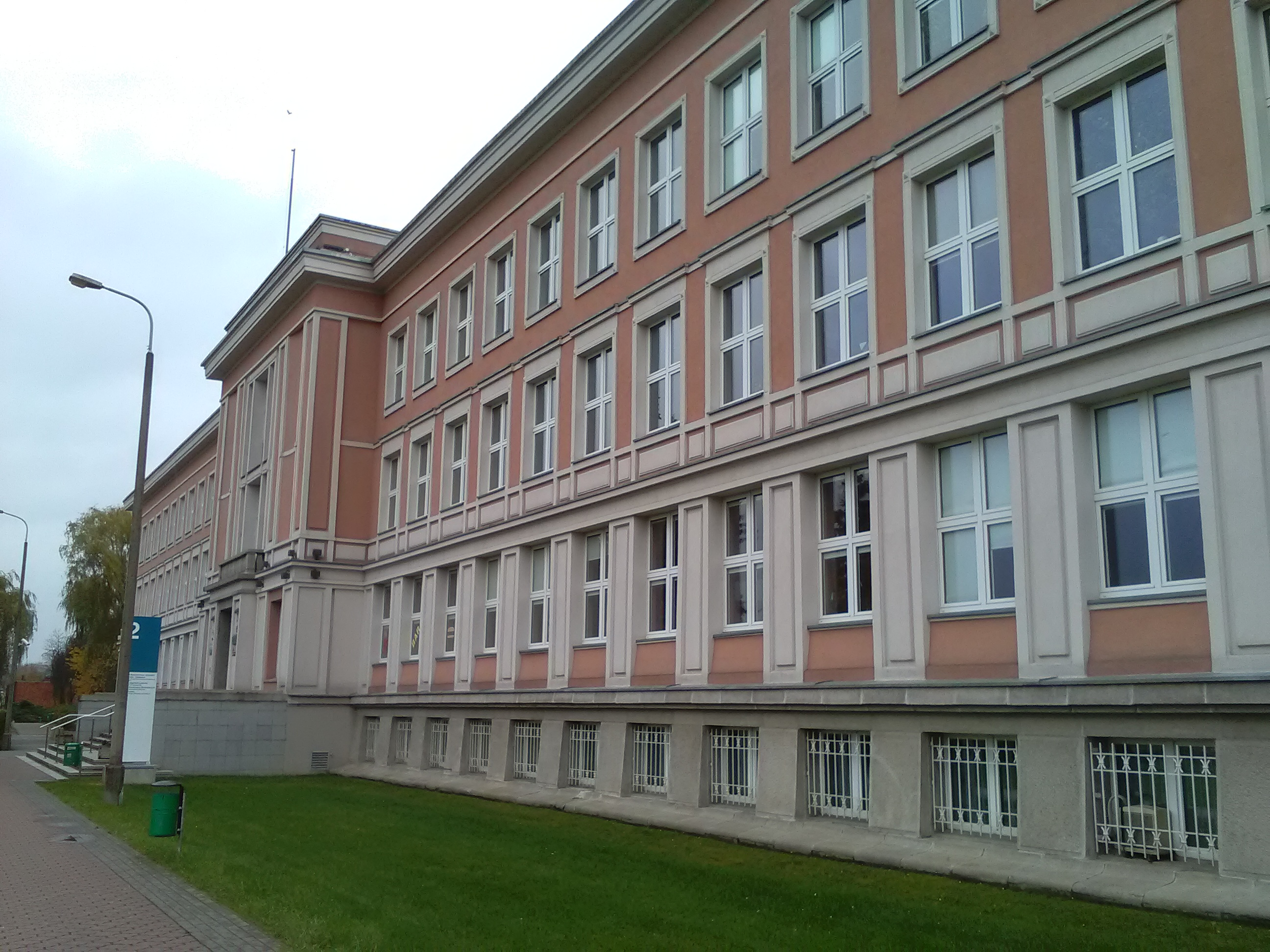
Poznań University of Technology PUT-1

== See also ==
- List of universities in Poland
- Universities in Poznan
