= Luk Van Wassenhove =

Professor of operations management

Luk van Wassenhove is a management thinker and educator. He is a professor of technology operations management at INSEAD, where he holds the Henry Ford Chaired Professorship in Manufacturing. He is also the Director of the Humanitarian Research Group and a Fellow of CEDEP, the European Center for Executive Education, based in France.

== Career ==
A graduate of the Katholieke Universiteit Leuven (Catholic University of Louvain), professor Van Wassenhove was on the faculty there and at Erasmus University in Rotterdam before joining INSEAD. He created the INSEAD Social Innovation Center and currently leads INSEAD's Humanitarian Research Group.

Professor Van Wassenhove is senior editor for Manufacturing and Service Operations Management and departmental editor for Production and Operations Management.

== Honors ==
Professor Van Wassenhove is a Fellow of the Production and Operations Management Society, a Distinguished Fellow of the Manufacturing and Services Operations Management Society, and Honorary Fellow of the European Operations Management Association. He is also a member of the Royal Flemish Academy of Sciences. In 2006, he received the EURO Gold Medal for outstanding academic achievement and in 2009 received the Lifetime Achievement Faculty Pioneer Award from the European Academy of Business in Society (EABIS) and the Aspen Institute. With 2018's naming as a Fellow of INFORMS for pioneering work on closed loop supply chains (sustainability) and humanitarian operations, Luk is the first professor to be recognised by five major professional Operations Management and Management Science societies.

== Work ==
Professor Van Wassenhove's work has covered a wide range of topics. His work on manufacturing and operational excellence has centered largely on understanding how to create operating environments that facilitate learning and the evolution of best practices. In his 2003 Harvard Business Review article with Daniel Guide he explored the challenges of managing a "reverse supply chain" in which manufacturers take back used products and repurpose them. He pursued this theme further in two books, looking in detail at the key differences between managing these types of supply chains and managing regular supply chains. More recently, his work has focused on managing humanitarian logistics. In his 2009 book with Rolando Tomasini he explored the challenges of creating logistics capabilities for situations of high uncertainty in terms of timing and location. Professor Van Wassenhove has also explored issues around project management and in a 2008 article for Harvard Business Review argued that experience could paradoxically be a disadvantage in managing complex projects with significant time lags between cause and effect.

== Recent publications ==
Professor Van Wassenhove has authored/co-aouthored the following recent academic papers:

- Plant Networks for Processing Recyclable Materials, Manufacturing and Services Operations Management Vol. 15, N°4, October 2013
- How Collection Cost Structure Drives a Manufacturer's Reverse Channel Choice, Production and Operations Management Journal Vol. 22, N°5, September 2013
- Anatomy of a Decision Trap in Complex New Product Development Projects, Academy of Management Journal Vol. 56, February 2013
- An Operations Perspective on Product Take-back Legislation for e-waste: Theory, Practice, and Research Needs, Production and Operations Management Journal Vol. 21, N°3, May 2012
- Lifecycle Pricing for Installed Base Management with Constrained Capacity and Remanufacturing, Production and Operations Management Journal Vol. 21, N°2, March 2012
- Field Vehicle Fleet Management in Humanitarian Operations: A Case-based Approach, Journal of Operations Management Vol. 29, N°5, July 2011
- Do Random Errors Explain Newsvendor Behavior?, Manufacturing and Services Operations Management Vol. 12, N°4, October 2010
- So What if Remanufacturing Cannibalizes my New Product Sales?, California Management Review Vol. 52, N°2, February 2010
