= Jacek Błażewicz =

Polish computer scientist and bioinformatician

- Born: August 11, 1951 (age 75); Poznań, Polish People's Republic
- Education: Poznań University of Technology
- Occupation: computer scientist
- Known for: research on theory of algorithms and bioinformatics
- Awards: Copernicus Award (2012); EURO Gold Medal (1991)
- Scientific career
- Thesis: Szeregowanie zadań przed liniami krytycznymi na procesorach systemów cyfrowych (1977)
- Doctoral advisor: Jan Węglarz

Jacek Antoni Błażewicz (born 11 August 1951, Poznań) is a Polish computer scientist specializing in the theory of algorithms and bioinformatics. He has been working as Director of the Institute of Computer Sciences of the Poznań University of Technology. He is also Head of the Department of Bioinformatics at the Institute of Bioorganic Chemistry of the Polish Academy of Sciences.

== Life and career ==
He was born on 11 August 1951, in Poznań, Polish People's Republic. He graduated in control engineering with honours from the Poznań University of Technology in 1974. In 1977, he obtained a doctoral degree at the Faculty of Electrical Engineering. In 1980, he received his habilitation and in 1987 he became a full professor. Between 1981-1984, he worked as a vice-Dean of the Electrical Engineering Faculty of the Poznan University of Technology. In 1995, he was appointed Head of the Laboratory of Algorithm Design and Programming Systems. In the years 1994-1999 he was also employed at the Faculty of Mathematics and Computer Science of the Adam Mickiewicz University in Poznań. Since 1999 he has been working at the Institute of Bioorganic Chemistry of the Polish Academy of Sciences. Between 2012-2013, he was a member of the National Science Centre. He is most notable for his research into DNA sequencing, DNA computing and the theory of algorithms. In 2012, he shared the Copernicus Award (together with Erwin Pesch) "for their joint research and development of algorithms in the field of scheduling and bioinformatics".

He is a member of a number of scientific associations including Polish Cybernetics Association, Polish Society of Bioinformatics, American Association for the Advancement of Science, American Mathematical Society and Polish Information Processing Society. In 2023, he was elected a member of the Academia Europaea. Błażewicz is also a member of editorial boards of numerous scientific journals and magazines such as Journal of Heuristics, Journal of Scheduling, Parallel Computing, Memetic Algorithms, Computational Methods in Science and Technology and Foundations of Computing and Decision Sciences. He has been a visiting professor at such universities and institutions as National Research Council, Rome; Clausthal University of Technology, Clausthal-Zellerfeld; Technical University of Nova Scotia, Halifax; Saarland University, Saarbrücken; Grenoble Institute of Technology; École Polytechnique Fédérale de Lausanne; he has also been an EPSRC Fellow at University of Nottingham and a member of EPSRC Peer Review College.

== Awards ==
- Fellow of the Institute of Electrical and Electronics Engineers (IEEE) (2013)
- Copernicus Award (2012)
- Honorary degree of the University of Siegen (2006)
- Scientific Award of the City Council of Poznań (2006)
- EURO Gold Medal of the Association of European Operational Research Societies (1991)
- Scientific Award of the Scientific Secretary of the Polish Academy of Sciences (1980)

== Selected publications ==
Błażewicz is an author and co-author of around 300 scientific publications and 15 monographs, some of which include:

- Scheduling in Computer and Manufacturing Systems (co-author with K.H. Ecker, G. Schmidt, J. Weglarz), Springer 1994, ISBN 978-3-540-58049-2
- Scheduling computer and manufacturing processes, Springer 1996, ISBN 3-540-61496-6
- Handbook on Parallel and Distributed Processing (co-editor with K. Ecker, B. Plateau, D. Trystram), Springer 2000, ISBN 978-3-540-66441-3
- Handbook on Data Management in Information Systems (co-editor with W. Kubiak, T. Morzy, M. Rusinkiewicz), Springer 2003, ISBN 978-3-540-43893-9
- Handbook on Scheduling. From Theory to Applications (co-author with K.H. Ecker, E. Pesch, G. Schmidt, J. Węglarz), Springer 2007, ISBN 978-3-540-28046-0

== See also ==
- List of Poles
- Timeline of Polish science and technology
