= Collegium Da Vinci =

Private university in Poznań, Poland

Coordinates: 52.4158°N 16.9313°E

- Collegium Da Vinci
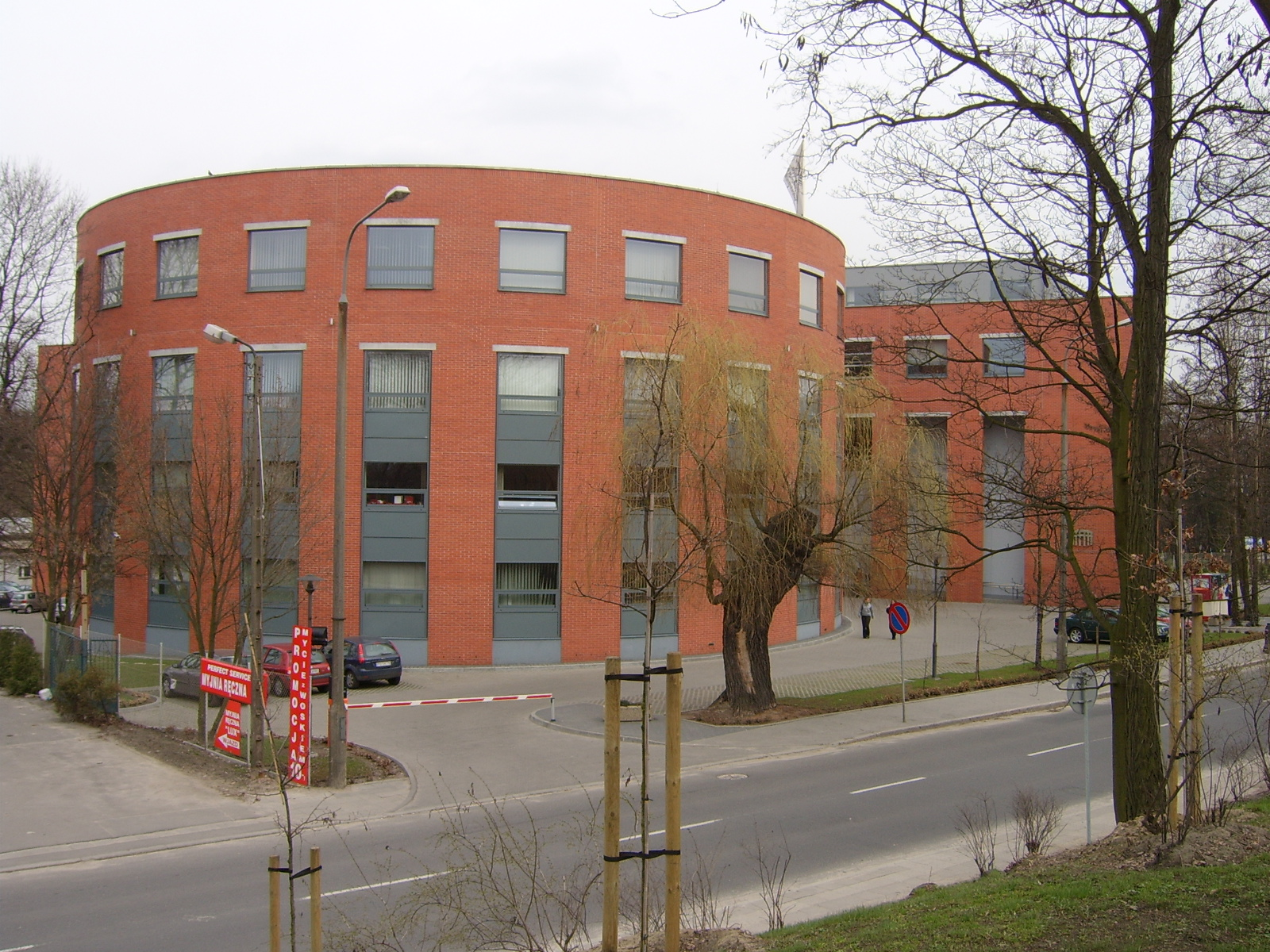
- The building at ul. Kutrzeby (proj. Mariusz Wrzeszcz) refers to a form located here once redoubt of Fort St. Wojciech
- Type: Private university
- Established: June 10, 1996
- Rector: Marek Zieliński
- Students: 3,375 (12.2023)
- Location: ul. gen. Tadeusza Kutrzeby 10, Poznań, Greater Poland Voivodeship, Poland
- Language: Polish, English
- Website: www.cdv.pl

Collegium Da Vinci is a private university in Poznań, Poland.

== History ==
June 10, 1996 the Minister of Education granted permission for the establishment of the Higher School of Humanities and Journalism in Poznań, where the initiator and founder is Piotr Voelkel. WSNHiD was included in the list of private universities at number 90. In the same year, the first students began their training at the direction of political science and social sciences. Two years later, WSNHiD added a new direction - international relations. In 2000, running are further directions - sociology and cultural studies, and in the following year - computer science. In 2006, the university obtains authorization to education in educational theory.

In July 2004 an agreement was concluded with the Institute of the Western Institute joint venture research and teaching, while in February 2008 WSNHiD has established close cooperation with the University of Social Sciences and Humanities in Warsaw. In June 2014 WSNHiD and Western Institute in Poznań signed an agreement to establish a Center for Scientific under the name Greater Scientific and Research Centre.

In 2014, The School of Humanities has changed its name to the Collegium Da Vinci.

== Rectors ==
- 1996–1999: Kazimierz Robakowski
- 1999–2002: Anna Michalska
- 2002–2008: Waldemar Łazuga
- 2008–2012: Karol Olejnik
- 2012–2022: Krzysztof Nowakowski
- 2022–present: Marek Zieliński
