= China Communications (journal) =

- Discipline: Information and communications technology
- Language: English
- Edited by: Jianhua Lu

Publication details
- History: 2004-present
- Publisher: China Communications Magazine
- Frequency: Monthly
- Impact factor: 2.688 (2020)

Standard abbreviations
- ISO 4: China Commun.

Indexing
- ISSN: 1673-5447
- OCLC no.: 947096268

Links
- Journal homepage; Online access; Online archive

China Communications is a monthly peer-reviewed academic journal covering all aspects of information and communications technology. It is published by China Communications Magazine and co-sponsored by the China Institute of Communications and the IEEE Communications Society. The editor-in-chief is Jianhua Lu (Tsinghua University).

== Abstracting and indexing ==
The journal is abstracted and indexed by the following databases:

- Inspec
- Science Citation Index Expanded
- Scopus

According to the Journal Citation Reports, the journal has a 2020 impact factor of 2.688.
