= Beale Medal =

Award by the Operational Research Society

The Beale Medal is the Operational Research Society's award for sustained contribution to the theory, practice, or philosophy of operations research in the UK over a period of years. It is first awarded in 1992 and named after the late Martin Beale, a British mathematician and a pioneer of operations research in the UK.

== Past recipients ==
The list of past recipients of the medal are

- 1992 Jonathan V. Rosenhead
- 1993 Douglas J. White
- 1994 not awarded
- 1995 Anthony (Tony) H. Christer
- 1996–1997 not awarded
- 1998 George H. Mitchell
- 1999 H. Paul Williams
- 2000–2004 not awarded
- 2005 Rolfe C. Tomlinson
- 2006 Peter Checkland
- 2007 Colin Eden
- 2008 Lyn Thomas
- 2009 Jeff Griffiths
- 2010 K. Brian Haley
- 2011 Frank P. Kelly
- 2012 Mark Elder
- 2013 Kevin Glazebrook
- 2014 Robert Fildes
- 2015 John Friend
- 2016 Richard Ormerod
- 2017 Michael C. Jackson
- 2018 Russell Cheng
- 2019 Ailsa Land
- 2020 Val Belton
- 2021 Chris Potts
- 2023 Robert G. Dyson
- 2024 Sally Brailsford
- 2025 Stewart Robinson
- 2026 Martin Pitt
