= Valerie Belton =

British professor of management

- Occupation: Professor
- Awards: Georg Cantor Lifetime Achievement Award 2008; Presidential Award of the European Association of Operational Research Societies 2012; Companion of the UK 2011; Presidential Award of the International Society for Multiple Criteria Decision Making 2004

Academic background
- Education: University of Cambridge (Ph.D); Lancaster University (M.Sc.); Durham University (B.Sc.)
- Thesis: A comparative study of methods for multiple criteria decision aid

Academic work
- Discipline: Operational research, Management science, decision analysis, problem structuring
- Notable works: Pioneer in the creation of visual interactive software for multicriteria analysis, V.I.S.A. Co-author of the book Multicriteria Decision Analysis: An Integrated Approach

Valerie Belton, commonly known as Val Belton, is a retired professor of management science at University of Strathclyde. She is a researcher who has worked on the design and application of multi-criteria decision making (MCDM) approaches for over 30 years. She co-authored a book on this field Multicriteria Decision Analysis: An Integrated Approach, that was released in 2002. She has attempted to incorporate multi-criteria decision analysis with problem structuring techniques, system dynamics, and other analytical approaches. She has a number of scholarly articles to her name and served as the editor of the journal Multi-Criteria Decision Analysis.

== Education and early career ==
Valerie Belton's journey in operational research commenced in 1977, when she received a first-class degree in mathematics from the University of Durham and proceeded to get a master's degree in operational research at the Lancaster University. Her first employment was as an OR analyst for the Civil Aviation Authority, where she worked on a huge social study to look at the impacts of aircraft noise at night on communities near Heathrow and Gatwick airports, as well as statistical modelling of the trans-Atlantic track systems' safety. She got associated with the UK OR Society during this time, serving as associate editor of the LASEORS (London and South East OR Society) bulletin and being the first female candidate to the OR Society's Council. Her passion in multiple criteria decision analysis, which she developed as a scholar at Lancaster, grew throughout her stay at CAA, and she left in 1984 to pursue a PhD in Multicriteria Decision Analysis with Stephen Watson at Cambridge University. She began her teaching career at the University of Kent in Canterbury after graduating from Cambridge, and then moved on to the University of Strathclyde in 1988.

== Research area / interests ==
Professor Belton's research in multiple-criteria decision analysis (MCDA) has earned her a worldwide recognition during the last 30 years. The subject of her PhD was "A comparative study of methods for multiple criteria decision aid". Her research has focused on supporting the theoretically and practically well-founded application of MCDA approaches to enhance management decision making in action as a result of this work.

She was particularly interested in integrating multiple criteria analysis with other techniques, such as expert systems, data envelopment analysis, scheduling methods, and issue structuring methods, with the goal of improving both.

The use of visual interactive modelling and integration of MCDA with other management science methods and methodologies, as well as across MCDA methods, are two major themes in this work, which are also explored in her book, Multicriteria Decision Analysis: An Integrated Approach, co-authored with Theo Stewart, published in 2002. She has a number of publications to her credit in this field, and she was a pioneer in the creation of visual interactive software for multicriteria analysis. V.I.S.A, her 1987 software product, is utilized for decision support and education all throughout the world.

Her interest in visual interactive modelling stretches to its application in education, which led to the co-direction of the MENTOR project with Mark Elder in the mid-1990s. The MENTOR project, which received a £500,000 funding from the UK government, created multimedia assets to teach OR.

Belton has also researched on public-sector performance assessment, how decision-makers benefit through models, and how student-centered teaching and learning may help build reflective OR practitioners.

== Services ==
=== Committee appointments ===
Belton has been very active in the national and international OR communities throughout her career. In 1980 she was the first woman to be elected to the Council of the UK OR Society and since then has served in many roles. She has been the President of EURO, The European Federation of OR Societies (2009-2010), Editor of the Journal of Multicriteria Decision Analysis (2000 - 2009), President of the UK OR Society (2004-2006), and President of the International Society for MCDM from 2000- 2004. Before being appointed as the President, Belton has also served as a vice-president of EURO from 1996 to 2000. Along with being President of both UK and Europe OR societies, she chaired the 1994 EURO-k conference and co-chaired the 2015 conference, both of which were held in Glasgow. She is on the Editorial Boards of the Journal of Multicriteria Decision Analysis (appointed 2009); European Journal of Operational Research (appointed 2010); and the European Journal of Decision Processes (appointed 2011).

=== University appointments ===
In relation to learning & teaching, Belton also held academic roles in University of Strathclyde Faculty as Vice Dean and Associate Deputy Principal. She spent almost 25 years as a professor at Strathclyde Business School's Department of Management Science. She worked as a lecturer in the University of Kent's Operational Research Department before moving to the University of Strathclyde in 1988.

== Membership activities ==
She has been a member of The OR Society UK and EURO for a long time. She has attended and organized streams at UK and worldwide OR conferences on a regular basis. During her term as President of The OR Society UK, she worked behind the ESRC and EPSRC's high-profile International Review of Research in Operational Research in the UK, which resulted in financial assistance for academic members. She headed the EURO XIII/OR 36 organizing committee in Glasgow in 1994.

== Awards and honors ==
She was awarded the Beale Medal in 2020. In 2008, Belton was awarded with the Georg Cantor Lifetime Achievement Award of the International Society for Multiple Criteria Decision Making. The Georg Cantor Award is given to a researcher who, over the course of an illustrious career, has embodied the spirit of impartial investigation and whose many new innovations and accomplishments are clearly reflected in the theory, methodology, and modern methods of MCDM. In 2004, she was awarded the Presidential Award of the International Society for Multiple Criteria Decision Making.

Belton was named a Companion of OR by the UK Operational Research Society during the annual Blackett Lecture at the Royal Society in London.

Some of her other awards and honors in the past decade are,

- Presidential Award of the European Association of Operational Research Societies (2012)
- Companion of the UK Operational Research Society (2011)
- President of the European Association of Operational Research Societies (EURO) - (President Elect 2008, Past President 2010–2009)

== Select publications ==
She has published over 163 scientific articles in all the leading OR journals with over 11,343 citations as of December 2021.

=== Peer-reviewed articles ===
- Belton, V., 1986. "A comparison of the analytic hierarchy process and a simple multi-attribute value function". European Journal of Operational Research, 26(1), pp. 7–21.
- Belton, V., Montibeller, G., Lucertini, G. and Tsoukias, A., 2013. "Policy analytics: an agenda for research and practice". EURO Journal on Decision Processes, 1(1-2), pp. 115–134.
- Valerie Belton, Tony Gear, "On a short-coming of Saaty's method of analytic hierarchies", Omega, Volume 11, Issue 3, 1983, Pages 228–230, ISSN 0305-0483, https://doi.org/10.1016/0305-0483(83)90047-6.
- Santos, S.P., Belton, V. and Howick, S. (2002), "Adding value to performance measurement by using system dynamics and multicriteria analysis", International Journal of Operations & Production Management, Vol. 22 No. 11, pp. 1246-1272. https://doi.org/10.1108/01443570210450284
- Tsoukias, A., Montibeller, G., Lucertini, G. et al. Policy analytics: an agenda for research and practice. EURO J Decis Process 1, 115–134 (2013). https://doi.org/10.1007/s40070-013-0008-3

More articles can be accessed through Valerie Belton's Google Scholar page.

=== Books ===
- Belton, V., and Stewart, T. 2002. Multiple Criteria Decision Analysis: An Integrated Approach. Springer Science & Business Media.
- Belton, V. 1997. DEA and MCDA: Competing Or Complementary Approaches?

== Other memberships ==
- EURO Journal on Decision Processes - Editorial board member (2012)
- PhD, Miloslawa Fink, An original multi-stage MCDA framework for supplier selection - Member (8/2011)
- HDR, Dr Miriam Merdad, Processus d’aide à la decision en gestion des risques - Member (5/2011)
- Editorial board member, European Journal of Operational Research - Editorial board member (2010)
- Journal of Multicriteria Decision Analysis - Associate editor (2009)

== Research grants ==
- Doctoral Training Grant | Kemp, Neil (co-investigator) 1-Oct-2009 - 16-Jun-2015
- Doctoral Training Grant 2006 | Morgan, Jennifer (principal investigator) 1-Jan-2008 - 25-Sep-2013

== Projects ==
- Improving Problem Structuring in Multi-Criteria Decision Analysis
- MCA4climate: A practical framework for pro-development climate policy planning

== See also ==
- Sally Brailsford
- Ruth Kauffman
