= Admiralty Research Laboratory =

Former UK military research laboratory

Coordinates: 51.4223°N 0.3383°W

Department overview
- Formed: 1921
- Preceding Department: Admiralty Experimental Station
- Dissolved: 1977
- Superseding Department: Admiralty Surface Weapons Establishment
- Jurisdiction: Government of the United Kingdom
- Headquarters: Admiralty Building Whitehall London
- Parent Department: Admiralty, Ministry of Defence

The Admiralty Research Laboratory (ARL) was a research laboratory that supported the work of the UK Admiralty. It was located in Teddington, London, England from 1921 to 1977.

== History ==
During the First World War, the Anti-Submarine Division of the Admiralty had established experimental stations at Hawkcraig (Aberdour) and Parkeston Quay, Harwich, with out-stations at Dartmouth and Wemyss Bay, to work on submarine detection methods. The Admiralty also established an experimental station at Shandon, Dunbartonshire, working with the Lancashire Anti-Submarine Committee and the Clyde Anti-Submarine Committee, which subsequently moved to Teddington in 1921, becoming the Admiralty Research Laboratory.

Its main fields of research expanded to include oceanography (it housed the National Institute of Oceanography from 1949 to 1953); electromagnetics and degaussing; underwater ballistics; visual aids; acoustics; infra-red radiation; photography and assessment techniques. It moved to Teddington, south west of London, so that it could benefit from the expertise of the National Physical Laboratory.

== Notable employees ==
- Francis Crick - worked on the design of magnetic and acoustic mines that were less susceptible to German minesweepers. Later, together with James Watson, Rosalind Franklin, and Maurice Wilkins, Crick played a crucial role in deciphering the helical structure of the DNA molecule and was jointly awarded the 1962 Nobel Prize in Physiology or Medicine.
- Martin Beale - member of the Mathematics Group; developed pioneering techniques for mathematical programming.
- Steven Vajda - contributed to the development of mathematical programming and operational research.
- Edward Lee - director of operational research. Later joined the National Physical Laboratory.
- Jack Good - cryptologist and statistician
- Reginald Victor Jones - air defence research specialist. Later principal scientific adviser to MI6 throughout the Second World War.
- Charles Drysdale (superintendent 1921–1929)
- Cyril Hilsum - electronics researcher. Later codeveloped the Ridley-Watkins-Hilsum theory that provided the theoretical basis of the transferred electron device, also known as the Gunn diode; his research also helped form the basis of modern LCD displays.
- Alister Watson - head of the Submarine Detection Research Section. Later suspected Soviet spy.
- Peter Wright - degaussing specialist. Later principal scientific officer for MI5.
- Thomas Gaskell - oceanographer and geophysicist, advised on anti-mine countermeasures. Later Chief Scientist on the worldwide oceanographic expedition of HMS Challenger that identified the record-setting depth now known as Challenger Deep,
- Albert Beaumont Wood - physicist who performed pioneering work related to underwater acoustics, developed sonar.
