= Christina Pagel =

British German mathematician

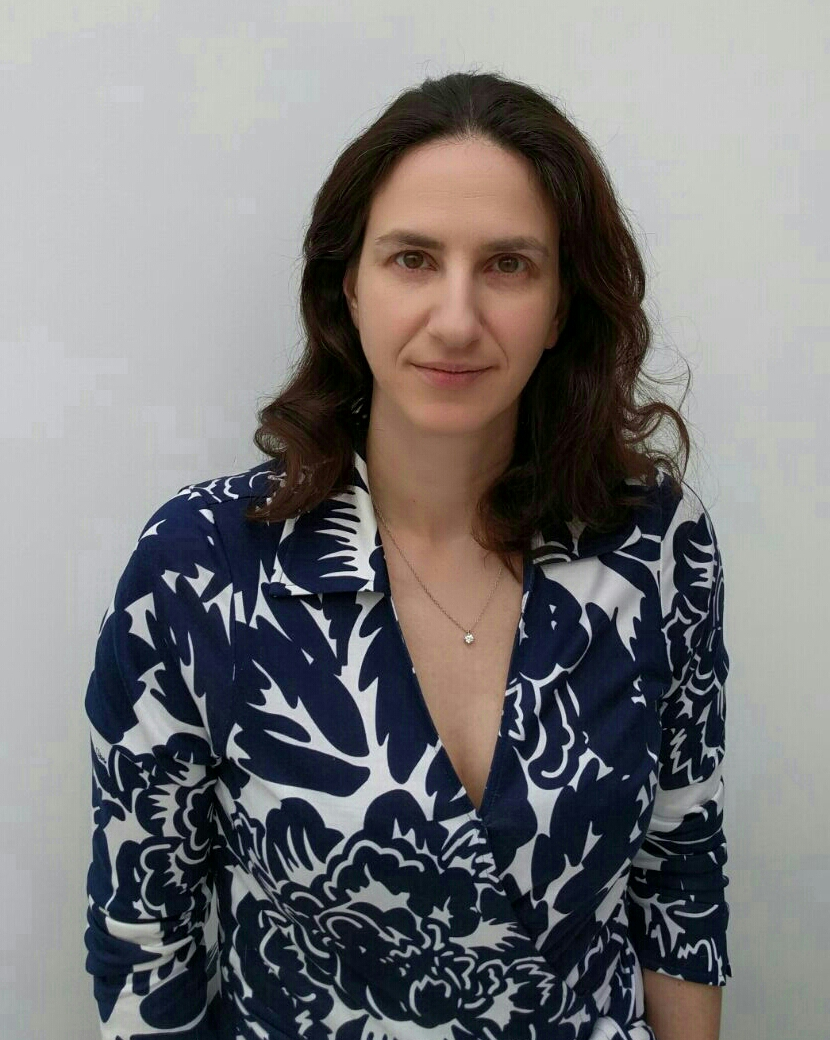
- Pagel in 2016
- Born: London, England
- Citizenship: United Kingdom, Germany
- Education: St Paul's Girls' School
- Alma mater: The Queen's College, Oxford; King's College London; Birkbeck College, University of London; Imperial College London
- Occupation: Professor of operational research
- Scientific career
- Workplaces: University College London
- Thesis: Analysis of turbulent intermittency in the heliospheric magnetic field using Ulysses data (2002)

Christina Pagel (/ˈpɑːɡəl/ PAH-gəl) FMedSci HonFFPH is a German-British mathematician and professor of operational research at University College London (UCL) within UCL's Clinical Operational Research Unit (CORU), which applies operational research, data analysis and mathematical modelling to topics in healthcare. She was Director of UCL CORU from 2017 to 2022 and is currently Vice President of the UK Operational Research Society. She also co-leads, alongside Rebecca Shipley, UCL's CHIMERA research hub which analyses data from critically ill hospital patients.

== Early life and education ==
Pagel graduated with a BA in mathematics from The Queen's College, Oxford in 1996. She also holds an MSc in Mathematical Physics from King's College London, and MAs in Classical Civilisation, Medieval History and an MSc in Applied Statistics with Medical Applications from Birkbeck College, University of London. In 2002 Pagel was awarded a PhD in Space Physics on Turbulence in the interplanetary magnetic field from Imperial College London.

== Research ==
Pagel's early career was spent in Boston, Massachusetts, studying the scattering of electrons in interplanetary space using data from the ACE spacecraft at Boston University with Professor Nancy Crooker. In 2005 she left physics, returning to London to take up a position with the UCL Clinical Operational Research Unit applying mathematics to problems in health care.

In 2016, Pagel was awarded a Harkness Fellowship in Health Care Policy and Practice by the Commonwealth Fund, through which Pagel spent 2016–2017 in the USA researching (a) the priorities of Republican and Democrat politicians for the goals of national health policy working with the Milbank Memorial Fund and (b) how clinical decision support systems can be better implemented within intensive care settings. During that year, she also completed a fellowship at the Institute for Healthcare Improvement.

Pagel was appointed as director of UCL's Clinical Operational Research Unit (CORU) in 2017. Her research uses approaches from mathematical modelling, operational research and data sciences to help people within the health service make better decisions. She focuses on mortality and morbidity outcomes following cardiac surgery in children and adults in the UK, leading and contributing to several large national projects; understanding the course of a child's stay in paediatric intensive care; mathematical methods to support service delivery within hospitals.

In her role since 2020 at UCL's CHIMERA centre (Collaborative Healthcare Innovation through Mathematics, EngineeRing and AI), Pagel co-leads a multidisciplinary team which analyses anonymised data from intensive care patients at University College Hospital and Great Ormond Street Hospital. Using tools including machine learning, the centre aims to improve understanding of the physiology of patients during illness and recovery, in order to improve their care.

Pagel was instrumental in developing a statistical model to take into account the complexity of individual children with congenital heart disease, when considering a hospital's survival rate. This led to the Partial Risk Adjustment in Surgery (PRAiS) model, which has been used by the National Congenital Heart Disease Audit since 2013 to publish hospital survival rates, and the associated software, developed by Pagel, has been purchased by all UK hospitals performing children's heart surgery. She then led a multidisciplinary project working with the Children's Heart Federation, Sense about Science and Sir David Spiegelhalter to build a website on survival after children's heart surgery, launched in 2016.

== Outreach and public engagement ==
Pagel is active in school and university outreach, encouraging participation in mathematics and science subjects.

Her work in developing the children's heart surgery website formed the basis of a national guide for researchers on how to involve the public and was separately featured in a Health Foundation guide on engagement.

She also contributed to the Sense about Science guide "Making Sense of Statistics".

In 2023, she was the Mathematics Section President for the annual British Science Festival.

== Politics, policy and Covid-19 ==
Pagel uses tools from her research to design and analyse political data from public polls, particularly in the context of Brexit and health policy, and she is known as a regular podcast contributor on both themes.

In May 2020, Pagel joined the Independent SAGE committee, whose aim is to offer independent advice to the UK Government during the COVID-19 pandemic. As part of her work for Independent SAGE, she is regularly quoted in several newspapers, writes for national newspapers and appeared on national and international broadcast media (e.g. ITV News, Sky News, Channel 4 News, and BBC Newsnight, India NDTV) and various podcasts discussing the UK's response to the pandemic.

She contributed to the UK Covid-19 Inquiry as an expert witness and built the website SageSearch to help journalists, lawyers, academics and the public search all documents submitted or produced by SAGE from 2020 to 2022.

Since November 2024, Pagel has been writing regularly about the Trump Administration, covering its attacks on science, health and democratic norms more broadly. She launched the TrumpActionTracker website in July 2025, which keeps track of authoritarian-like actions of the administration since January 2025.

== Awards and recognition ==
In 2019, Pagel was awarded the Lyn Thomas Impact Medal from the Operational Research Society, along with her colleagues Sonya Crowe and Martin Utley. The award was made for their work related to congenital heart disease and recognised the "significant impact on the lives of children with congenital heart disease, as well on their families and the growing population of adults with the condition".

In September 2021, Pagel was one of two recipients (alongside Devi Sridhar) of a special recognition award from The BMJ, and in October 2021 she won a HealthWatch UK award, both for her work in public engagement in science during the COVID-19 pandemic. She was a Turing Fellow of the Alan Turing Institute by special appointment from 2021 to 2022. In November 2021, she was awarded the "Companion of OR" prize by the UK Operational Research Society.

She was appointed as Vice President of the UK Operational Research Society for a three-year period from January 2022 to December 2024, and extended for a second term (2025-2027). She delivered the prestigious annual Blackett Lecture in December 2022.

In 2023 she was named as the Mathematics Section President for the annual British Science Festival. Presidents are considered leaders in their fields.

She was a Royal Statistical Society 2023 "Statistical Excellence in Journalism Award" winner, in the category "Best statistical commentary by a non-journalist" for her article "Physics: Do girls avoid it because it's too hard?" – BBC Science Focus, 9 May 2022.

Pagel was elected as an Honorary Fellow of the UK Faculty of Public Health (FPH) in 2024, the highest category of FPH membership and a Fellow of the Academy of Medical Sciences in 2025.
