= International Transactions in Operational Research =

- Discipline: Operations Research and Management Science and Management
- Language: English
- Edited by: Celso C. Ribeiro

Publication details
- History: 1994-Present
- Publisher: Wiley-Blackwell on behalf of the International Federation of Operational Research Societies.
- Frequency: Bimonthly
- Impact factor: 3.1 (2022)

Standard abbreviations
- ISO 4: Int. Trans. Oper. Res.

Indexing
- ISSN: 0969-6016 (print); 1475-3995 (web)
- OCLC no.: 49890081

Links
- Journal homepage; Online access

International Transactions in Operational Research is a peer-reviewed academic journal which is published six times a year by Wiley-Blackwell on behalf of the International Federation of Operational Research Societies. The editorial mission of the journal is to advance the theory and practice of Operational Research and Management Science internationally. The current Editor is Celso C. Ribeiro, Universidade Federal Fluminense.

== Abstracting and Indexing ==
International Transactions in Operational Research is abstracted and indexed in the Social Sciences Citation Index, Scopus, ProQuest, EBSCO, and International Abstracts in Operations Research. According to the Journal Citation Reports, the journal has a 2022 impact factor of 3.1, ranking it 32nd out of 86 journals in the category "Operations Research & Management Science".

== Operational Research Hall of Fame ==
In 2003, International Transactions in Operational Research introduced its ‘Hall of Fame’ feature, in which brief biographies of key figures in the OR field are published. Individuals who have been celebrated in this section of the journal include George Dantzig, Russell L. Ackoff and Jay Wright Forrester.
