= Douglas J. White =

British operations researcher (1933–2012)

Douglas John White (1933 – 27 July 2012) was a British operations researcher and mathematician. He is one of the founding figures of operational research (OR) in academic institutions in the United Kingdom. Over a career spanning more than four decades, he made foundational contributions to decision theory, dynamic programming, Markov decision processes, and multi-objective optimization.

== Education and career ==
White studied mathematics at the University of Oxford, graduating with a BA in 1956 and an MA in 1960. He subsequently pursued graduate study at the University of Birmingham, where he earned an MSc and PhD in Operational Research in 1959 and 1962, respectively. His PhD thesis was on dynamic programming. At this time, the University of Birmingham housed the first academic course in OR in the world, established in the early 1950s, and White was among the earliest generation of scholars to train in the discipline at the university level.

In 1965, White joined the University of Strathclyde, where he was a Reader until 1968. He went on to found the Department of Operational Research there, serving as its head from 1968 to 1971. During the same period, he also founded and directed the Centre for Operational Research and the Health Services Operational Research Unit. In 1971, White joined the University of Manchester as a professor of decision theory. In 1972, he founded the Department of Decision Theory at Manchester and served as the head of the department from 1972 to 1988. In 1987, White was awarded a DSc in Operational Research from the University of Birmingham. White moved to the US in the late 1980s and was a professor at the University of Virginia from 1988 to 1994 and served as Chair of the Department of Systems Engineering from 1988 to 1989. White returned to the University of Manchester in the 1990s and became professor emeritus from 2000 until his death.

== Honors and awards ==
White received an honorary MA in economics from the University of Manchester in 1974. He is a fellow of the Institute of Mathematics and its Applications. In 1993, he was awarded the Beale Medal of the Operational Research Society.

== Bibliography ==
- White, D. J. (1969). Dynamic programming. Mathematical economics texts. Edinburgh, London, San Francisco: Oliver & Boyd; Holden-Day. ISBN 978-0-05-001624-4.
- White, D. J.; Donaldson, William Anderson; Lawrie, Norman (1969). Operational research techniques. Vol. 1. London: Business Books. ISBN 978-0-220-79949-6.
- White, D. J.; Donaldson, William; Lawrie, Norman (1974), Operational research techniques, vol. 2, London: Business Books, ISBN 978-0-220-66250-9
- White, Douglas John (1975). Decision Methodology: A Formalization of the OR Process. Wiley. ISBN 978-0-471-94045-6.
- White, Douglas John (1976). Fundamentals of Decision Theory. North-Holland. ISBN 978-0-7204-8605-6.
- White, Douglas John (1978). Finite Dynamic Programming: An Approach to Finite Markov Decision Processes. Wiley. ISBN 978-0-471-99629-3.
- White, Douglas John (1982). Optimality and Efficiency. Wiley. ISBN 978-0-471-10223-6.
- Hartley, Roger; Hartley, R.; Thomas, L. C.; White, Douglas John, eds. (1980). Recent Developments in Markov Decision Processes. Academic Press. ISBN 978-0-12-328460-0.
- White, Douglas John (1985). Operational Research. Wiley. ISBN 978-0-471-90718-3.
- French, S.; Hartley, R.; Thomas, L. C.; White, D. J. (1986). Operational research techniques. London; Baltimore, Md., USA: E. Arnold. ISBN 978-0-7131-3557-2.
- White, D. J. (1993). Markov decision processes. Chichester, England; New York: John Wiley & Sons. ISBN 978-0-471-93627-5.
