= OR Insight =

- Discipline: Operations research, management
- Language: English
- Edited by: Alistar Clark

Publication details
- History: 1988-2013
- Publisher: Palgrave Macmillan
- Frequency: Quarterly

Standard abbreviations
- ISO 4: OR Insight

Indexing
- ISSN: 0953-5543 (print); 1759-0477 (web)
- OCLC no.: 629771117

Links
- Journal homepage; Online access; Online archive

OR Insight is a discontinued peer-reviewed academic journal covering operations research. It is an official journal of The Operational Research Society. OR Insight published full length case-oriented papers aimed at managers, consultants and operational research practitioners.

== Abstracting and indexing ==
The journal is abstracted and indexed by Association of Business Schools' Academic Journal Quality Guide, International Abstracts in Operations Research, and PASCAL.
