= Admiralty station =

Admiralty station may refer to:

- Admiralty station (MTR), in Admiralty, Hong Kong
- Admiralty MRT station, in Woodlands, Singapore

== See also ==
- Admiralty Experimental Station, a research department of the British Admiralty 1915–1921
- Admiralty Pier railway station, in Dover, England 1864–1914
- Admiralty (disambiguation)
