= Martin Beale =

British mathematician

- Beale in 1979 by Godfrey Argent
- Born: Evelyn Martin Lansdowne Beale; 8 September 1928; Stanwell Moor, England
- Died: 23 December 1985 (aged 57); Cornwall, England
- Education: Trinity College, Cambridge
- Scientific career
- Fields: Mathematical programming
- Workplaces: Admiralty Research Laboratory; CEIR; Imperial College, London

Evelyn Martin Lansdowne Beale FRS (8 September 1928 – 23 December 1985) was a British applied mathematician and statistician who was one of the pioneers of mathematical programming.

== Education and career ==
Beale was born in Stanwell Moor in the Middlesex county (now in Surrey) of England. His father, Evelyn Stewart Lansdowne Beale, was a senior physicist at the Anglo-Persian Oil Company. His mother, Muriel Rebecca (Betsy) Slade, was a leader in the Women's Institute and the great-niece of Edmond Warre.

Beale was educated at Winchester College and at Trinity College, Cambridge, graduating with First Class Honours in mathematics in 1949 and gaining a diploma in mathematical statistics in 1950. He then joined the Mathematics Group at the UK Admiralty Research Laboratory, working under Steven Vajda for 11 years, except for a leave of absence in 1957/58 to assist the Statistical Techniques Research Group at Princeton University. In 1955 he extended George Dantzig's Simplex Algorithm to minimise a quadratic function.

In 1961, Beale became a founder member of a computer services company CEIR (Corporation for Economic and Industrial Research), which BP bought and renamed Scicon, and in 1967 he became visiting professor at Imperial College, London.

== Honors ==
Beale was chairman of the Mathematical Programming Society from 1974 to 1976, vice-president of the Royal Statistical Society from 1978 to 1980, a Fellow of the British Computer Society, and a member of the International Statistical Institute. In 1979, he was elected a Fellow of the Royal Society "for his applications of mathematical and statistical techniques to industrial problems and for his contributions to the theory of mathematical programming", and he was elected to the Council of the Royal Society in 1984. He was awarded the Silver Medal of the Operational Research Society in 1980, and became vice-president of the Institute of Mathematics and its Applications. He was also non-executive chairman of Beale International Technology.

The Times suggested that he "used his blend of theory and state-of-the-art practice to encourage several generations of young mathematicians and computer scientists," and that his "many papers and his seminal book Mathematical Programming in Practice were major influences in their field, with their succinctness and clarity."

Beale's FRS memoir mentioned his "extraordinary skill" and "substantial contributions to knowledge".

== Memorials ==
- The Mathematical Programming Society awards the "Beale–Orchard-Hays" Prize in memory of him and William Orchard-Hays.
- The Operational Research Society awards the Beale Medal for "the most outstanding sustained contribution to Operational Research", and hosts the Beale Lectures in his honour as "one of OR's true greats".
- A two-day symposium was held in his memory at the Royal Society in 1987.
- The book Questions of Truth is dedicated to him and Ruth Polkinghorne.
- He makes a cameo appearance in E.M. Delafield's A Provincial Lady Goes Further.

== Publications ==
Beale produced over 100 scholarly papers and two books:

- Beale, Evelyn Martin Lansdowne (1968). Mathematical programming in practice. John Wiley & Sons. ISBN 9780471060857.
- Beale, Evelyn Martin Landsdowne; MacKley, Lynne (1988). Introduction to optimization. Wiley. ISBN 9780471917601. (Based on his lecture notes and working papers at Scicon and edited by his former colleague Lynne Mackley.)

== Family ==
Beale was a son of Muriel Rebecca Beale OBE, descendant of General Sir John Slade, grandniece of Edmond Warre, niece of Henry Adolphus Warre Slade, daughter of Marcus Warre Slade Queen's Counsel, and first cousin of Madelaine Slade.
