= Ruth Kaufman =

British operations research specialist

- Education: Mathematics and Social Sciences from the University of Sussex
- Known for: Contribution to the field of operational research
- Awards: Companion of OR
- Honours: OBE "for services to Operational Research"

Ruth Kaufman OBE is a British specialist in operations research (OR). As of 2018 she is a visiting senior fellow at the London School of Economics, where her role is to create links between academics and OR practitioners, and also practises as a consultant.

== Education ==
Kaufman has a B.A. (1974) in mathematics and social sciences from the University of Sussex.

== Career ==
She has worked in OR in the fields of transport and electricity, and as a principal OR analyst at the Department of Health. Staying in government posts, she led the OR unit of the Export Credits Guarantee Department (ECGD) and became the chair of the Government Operational Research Service and chair of the Heads of OR Forum. She was head of strategy, change and OR at the ECGD before retiring from that post in 2008.

She was the president of the Operational Research Society 1 January 2016 - 31 December 2017. She was a co-founder of the society's Pro Bono OR scheme, launched in 2013.

== Other activities ==
Outside work she was chair for five years to 2014 of Woman's Trust, a charity supporting women in London who face domestic violence.

== Recognition ==
In 2011 she was made a Companion of OR, an award "for sustained support and encouragement for the development of Operational Research".

In the 2016 New Year Honours she was appointed OBE "for services to Operational Research".
