= Journal of Simulation =

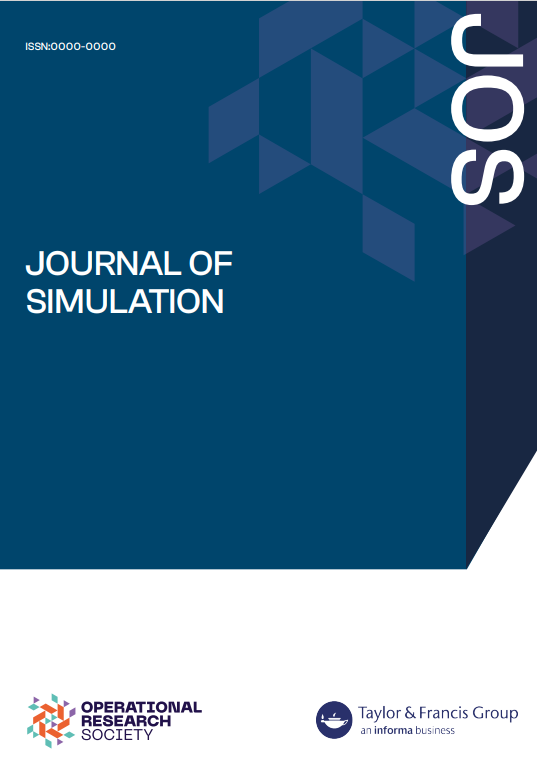
- Language: English
- Edited by: Charles Macal, Navonil Mustafee, Claudia Szabo, Enlu Zhou

Publication details
- History: 2006-present
- Publisher: Taylor & Francis
- Frequency: Quarterly
- Open access: Hybrid
- Impact factor: 1.3 (2023)

Standard abbreviations
- ISO 4: J. Simul.

Indexing
- ISSN: 1747-7778 (print); 1747-7786 (web)
- OCLC no.: 174289573

Links
- Journal homepage; Online access; Online archive

The Journal of Simulation is a peer-reviewed scientific journal covering research and practice in the field of simulation. It is an official journal of the Operational Research Society. It publishes both full length articles and technical notes.

== Abstracting and indexing ==
The journal is abstracted and indexed in Ei Compendex, International Abstracts in Operations Research, Science Citation Index Expanded, and Scopus. According to the Journal Citation Reports, the journal has a 2023 impact factor of 1.3.
