= Sally Brailsford =

British professor of management science (born 1951)

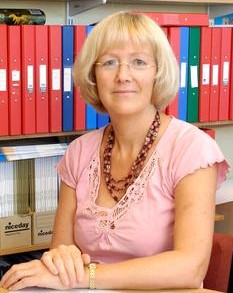
- Education: University of Southampton (MSc., Ph.D), King's College London (BSc.),
- Occupation: Professor of Management Science
- Employer: University of Southampton (1990 - 2025)
- Awards: Goodeve Medal (Operational Research Society) in 2004, 2006, 2015; Companion of Operational Research (Operational Research Society) in 2016.

Sally Brailsford (born 1951) is a British professor of management science within Southampton Business School at the University of Southampton. Her research focuses on operational research and healthcare modelling to evaluate treatments and screening programmes, and to improve health service delivery.

== Education and early career ==
Brailsford was born in Cheltenham and studied at Pate's Grammar School for Girls. She graduated with a B.Sc. in mathematics from King's College London in 1973.

In 1974 she studied Russian at the Polytechnic of Central London (now the University of Westminster), gaining a Distinction in the Intermediate Diploma of the Chartered Institute of Linguists in 1975.

In 1976 she moved to Hampshire, and completed two years of nurse training at Southampton General Hospital. She worked as a translator for eight years, and also occasionally as an agency nurse.

In 1987 she gave up both jobs and returned to academia, obtaining an M.Sc. (with Distinction) in Operational Research from the University of Southampton in 1988, and a Ph.D. in mathematics from the same institution in 1993.

== Research area ==
Her major research interest is health care simulation modelling aimed at improving service delivery or evaluating screening programmes and treatments. This has encompassed work in a broad range of clinical application areas including diabetes, cancer, mental health and HIV/AIDS, emergency care and end-of-life care. Her interests span simulation methodologies, discrete event simulation, system dynamics, disease and vaccination modelling, and the modelling of human behaviour in healthcare systems. Later, Brailsford's interests focused on understanding why modelling approaches do not have as much influence in health care services as they have in other industries and the challenges of conducting impactful operational research in health

== Services ==
=== University appointments ===
Within the University of Southampton, Brailsford is Associate Dean for Research & Enterprise in the Faculty of Social Sciences and was previously Associate Dean for Research in the former Faculty of Business & Law (2010-2013). She has also served as Head of the Management Science Department and has twice acted as Director of Southampton's Centre for Operational Research, Management Science & Information Systems CORMSIS). Brailsford held a number of fixed term research posts in the Faculty of Mathematical Studies at the University of Southampton (1988-1997) before moving to the former School of Management at Southampton, first as a Lecturer and later a Senior Lecturer in Management Science. In 2007 Brailsford was appointed as a Professor in Management Science within Southampton Business School. She has formally retired from her post in November 2025.

=== Committee appointments ===
Brailsford served as a Council member of I-Sim, the INFORMS Simulation Society (2016-2017). From 2010 to 2019 she was Chair of the EURO Working Group on OR Applied to Health Services (ORAHS) and between 2012 and 2015 she was Vice President 1 of EURO (the Association of European OR Societies). Within the UK, Brailsford has been active in the Operational Research Society, serving as vice-president from 2006 to 2008 and as a member of several of the society's committees. She co-founded, and for a number of years was chair of, two of the society's special interest groups: SD+ (originally aimed to promote the wider use of system dynamics, but now subsumed into the Simulation SIG) and the Behavioural OR SIG.

Together with Paul Harper, she chaired the society's 50th Anniversary Conference OR50 in York in 2008. She was a founding co-Editor-in-Chief of the journal Health Systems (2011–2019). She served as Chair of the UK Committee of Professors in Operational Research (COPIOR) (2014-2017). She was also a member of the Policy Council of the UK Chapter of the System Dynamics Society (2014-2016) and is a founding member of MASHnet, the UK Network for Modelling & Simulation in Healthcare.

=== Conferences and workshops ===
She has been an invited plenary or keynote speaker at numerous international conferences and workshops, including most recently:

- Interdisciplinarity of Health and Healthcare 2019, Lodz, Poland (June 2019)
- 30th European Conference on Operational Research, Dublin, Ireland (June 2019)
- 39th Operations Research / Industrial Engineering National Congress, YAEM 2019, Ankara, Turkey (June 2019)
- Optimization Days, Montreal, Canada (May 2019)
- The Operational Research Society's Simulation Workshop (SW18), Stratford-upon-Avon, UK (March 2018)
- CIIO, Medellin, Colombia (August 2017)
- International Symposium on Modeling and Simulation of Complex Management Systems, Shenzhen, China (May 2016)

She was one of only three UK researchers to contribute to a special invited track on the history of simulation at the 50th US Winter Simulation Conference, held in Las Vegas in December 2017. Her paper was entitled ‘Five Decades of Healthcare Simulation’.

== Awards and recognitions ==
Brailsford has won the Operational Research Society's Goodeve Medal (awarded for the best paper in the Journal of the Operational Research Society each year) a record-breaking three times (in 2004, 2006 and 2015). In 2016, she was also awarded the Companion of Operational Research by the Operational Research Society.

== Selected publications ==
She has a total of 215 publications with around 6626 citations as of December 2021.

=== Peer-reviewed articles ===
- Brailsford, S., Potts, C., Smith, B., 1999. "Constraint satisfaction problems: Algorithms and applications". European journal of operational research 119 (3), 557-581
- Brailsford, S., Harper, P., Patel, B., Pitt, M., 2009. "An analysis of the academic literature on simulation and modelling in health care". Journal of simulation 3 (3), 130-140
- Young, T., Brailsford, S., Connell, S., Davies, R., Harper, P., Klein, J., 2004. "Using industrial processes to improve patient care". Bmj 328 (7432), 162-164
- Brailsford, S., Lattimer, V., Tarnaras, P., Turnbull, J., 2004. "Emergency and on-demand health care: modelling a large complex system". Journal of the Operational Research Society 55 (1), 34-42
- Katsaliaki, K., Brailsford, S., 2007. "Using simulation to improve the blood supply chain". Journal of the Operational Research Society 58 (2), 219-227

=== Books ===
She is an editor of the book Discrete-Event Simulation and System Dynamics for Management Decision Making.

== Projects ==
- Adding social ties to the Schelling model (with Seth Bullock (investigator), Elisabeth zu-Erbach-Schoenberg)
- Care Life Cycle (with Seth Bullock, Jason Noble, Jakub Bijak (investigators), Elisabeth zu-Erbach-Schoenberg, Jason Hilton, Jonathan Gray)
- Fracturing of small social networks (with Seth Bullock (investigator), Elisabeth zu-Erbach-Schoenberg)

== Personal life ==
In 2000 Brailsford married Chris Potts, professor of Operational Research at the University of Southampton. She has three children from her previous marriage.
