= Arthur Eve (disambiguation) =

Arthur Eve (born 1933) is a New York politician.

Arthur Eve may also refer to:

- Arthur Stewart Eve (1862–1948), English-Canadian physicist
- Arthur Malcolm Trustram Eve, 1st Baron Silsoe (1894–1976), British barrister
