= Steven Vajda =

Hungarian-British mathematician

Steven Vajda (20 August 1901 – 10 December 1995) was a Hungarian-British mathematician who contributed to the development of mathematical programming and operational research. He was a member of a circle of researchers that included George Dantzig, Abraham Charnes, W.W. Cooper, William Orchard-Hays, Martin Beale and others. He worked and taught as an actuary and as a mathematician in operational research from 1925 to 1995.

From 1939 until his death in 1995, he lived in the U.K. where he was a defence scientist with the Royal Naval Scientific Service, and a professor at Birmingham and Sussex Universities. He was a Companion of the Operational Research Society, a Fellow of the Royal Statistical Society, a Fellow of the Institute of Mathematical Statistics and a member of the Mathematical Association.

He is the author or coauthor of at least a dozen books on mathematical programming, game theory, manpower planning and statistics and of many journal publications and conference papers.

== Early life ==
Steven (originally István) Vajda was born in Budapest in 1901, to Josef and Aurelia Wollak. His family moved to Vienna in 1903, and it was in this city that Steven was raised and educated. He read mathematics and received a Dr. Phil. Degree in 1925 from the University of Vienna. One of his first appointments was in Romania where he was an actuarial advisor to the Romanian government. He eventually returned to Vienna to continue his work as an actuary and was married there in 1929.

In 1939, Steven, wife Eva and their two children, Hedy and Robert, fled the Nazi regime that had taken over Austria in the 1938 Anschluss. The children were sent to Sweden and Eva was admitted to the UK as a domestic servant. Steven’s friend Karl Popper had already left Austria and, as a New Zealand resident and lecturer in philosophy at Canterbury University College, he found Steven a job and helped him to obtain the necessary travel documents. Steven was then able to enter England because he was merely in transit. The plan was to reunite the family in England and then leave for New Zealand, but before that could happen, the Second World War started and the Vajdas were briefly interned as "enemy aliens". They were housed in a camp on the Isle of Man with other refugees from across Europe. The internees organized a school for their children and, of course, Steven taught mathematics. Most of the internees were released after several months and Steven found employment as an actuary.

== Career in the United Kingdom ==
Meanwhile, mathematicians were in demand to staff the newly formed military operational research groups. H. Seal who was with the Admiralty O.R. group, had read Steven’s research publications in the Bulletin des actuaires suisses, and when he found that Steven was in England he sought him out and proposed that he join the war effort. After much bureaucratic manoeuvring, Steven joined the Royal Naval Scientific Service of the British Admiralty. When the war ended, Seal saw to it that Steven was one of the first "aliens" to be given British citizenship. Steven stayed with the Admiralty until 1964, holding such appointments as Assistant Director of Operational Research and Head of the Mathematical Group. In 1964, he "retired" for the first time.

In 1964, Steven became Professor of Operational Research at the University of Birmingham. Upon his second "retirement" in 1967 he continued at Birmingham in a research appointment in mathematical statistics, working with Henry Daniels, David Wishart and Vic Barnett. He stayed until 1973, when, at the behest of Professor Pat Rivett, he once again "retired" in order to become Visiting Professor of Mathematics at Sussex University. He remained an active member of the Sussex staff until he died in 1995 in Brighton, two years after the birth of his first great grandchild Alexandra Eva (named after his wife).

== Works ==
- Theory of Games and Linear Programming (1956)
- Readings in Linear Programming (1958)
- Introduction to Linear Programming and the Theory of Games (1960)
- Mathematical Programming (1961)
- Mathematics of Experimental Design (1970)
- Probabilistic Programming (1972)
- Theory of Linear and Nonlinear Programming (1974)
- Mathematics of Manpower Planning (1978)
- Handbook of Applicable Mathematics: Supplement (1990), co-authored with Walter Ledermann, Emlyn Lloyd and Carol Alexander
- Mathematical Games and How to Play Them (1992)
- A Mathematical Kaleidoscope: Applications in Industry, Business and Science (1995), co-authored with by Brian Conolly
- Fibonacci and Lucas Numbers, and the Golden Section: Theory and Applications (2008)

== Additional sources ==
- Bather, John (1 January 1996). "Obituaries : Stefan Vajda". The Independent.
- Haley K.B. and Williams H.P; The work of Professor Steven Vajda 1901–1995; Journal of the Operational Research Society, Volume 49, Number 3, 1 March 1998, p. 298-301;
- Shutler, M.; Editorial: The life of Steven Vajda; IMA; J Management Math.1997; 8: 193-194;
- Author’s biography appearing in Mathematical Programming (by Steven Vajda), Addison-Wesley, 1961
- Biography of Steven Vajda from the Institute for Operations Research and the Management Sciences
