= Colin Eden =

British management scientist

Colin Eden was a professor in management science and operations research at Strathclyde University.

Eden worked as an operational researcher after being awarded a doctorate. He then proceeded to academia, first working at the University of Bath Management School as a senior lecturer, then, as a reader.

He then assumed a professorship at Strathclyde University in management science. He subsequently became head of department at the Strathclyde Business School. And then Director of the Graduate School of Business at Strathclyde, and then finally Vice Dean. His research interests is in business strategy, project management, and operations research.

== Select publications ==
- Eden, C., 1995. Strategic options development and analysis (SODA)
- Colin Eden (1988). "Cognitive mapping". European Journal of Operational Research. 36 (1): 1–13. doi:10.1016/0377-2217(88)90002-1.
- Eden, C., Ackermann, F. and Cropper, S., 1992. The analysis of cause maps. Journal of Management Studies, 29(3), pp. 309–324. doi: 10.1111/j.1467-6486.1992.tb00667.x
- Eden, C., 1992. On the nature of cognitive maps. Journal of Management Studies, 29(3), pp. 261–265. doi: 10.1111/j.1467-6486.1992.tb00664.x
- Eden, Colin and Ackermann, Fran., 1998. Making Strategy: The Journey of Strategic Management. London: Sage.
- Eden, C.; Ackermann, F., and Williams, T. The Amoebic Growth of Project Costs. Project Management Journal. 2005; 36(2):15-27.
- Eden, C. and Huxham, C., 2006. Researching Organizations Using Action Research. Clegg, S.; Hardy, C., and Nord, W., Eds. Handbook of Organization Studies. Beverly Hills: Sage; pp. 388–408.
- Ackermann, Fran and Eden, Colin., 2011. Making Strategy: Mapping Out Strategic Success. London: Sage.
