= Alister Watson =

British mathematician (1908–1982)

Alister George Douglas Watson (2 May 1908 – 16 October 1982) was a mathematician who was identified by several writers as a key member of the Cambridge spy ring.

== Early years ==
Born in Leigh-on-Sea, Essex, England, Watson attended Winchester School and studied mathematics at King's College, Cambridge. He was elected a fellow in 1933 and published two papers during his fellowship, "Mathematics and its foundations" (Mind, volume 47 (1938), pp. 440– 451) and "Principal directions in a gravitational field" (Proceedings of the Edinburgh Mathematical Society (Series 2) 6.01 (1939): 12-16).

Watson joined the Communist Party of Great Britain whilst at Cambridge and also became a member and later secretary of the Cambridge Apostles. In the summer of 1937, he introduced Ludwig Wittgenstein to Alan Turing. He was also well acquainted with John Maynard Keynes and other leading figures of the Cambridge academic life of the time.

Watson and Frank P. Ramsey assisted the economist Piero Sraffa with the mathematics for his book Production of commodities by Means of Commodities.

== Career ==
Following Cambridge, Watson joined the British Admiralty as a civilian, working at the Admiralty Signal and Radar Establishment and eventually rose to become head of the Submarine Detection Research Section of the Admiralty Research Laboratory (ARL).

After the war, Watson published various papers relating to his research work, including "Millimetre Wave Propagation" (Nature, 158 (1946): 943) and "Absolute Axes and Tidal Forces" (Nature, 159 (1947): 233). He also published two further papers of more general mathematical interest, "On the geometry of the wave equation" (Mathematical Proceedings of the Cambridge Philosophical Society, Vol. 43. No. 04. Cambridge University Press, 1947) and "On Mizel's problem" (Journal of the London Mathematical Society, 1.1 (1962): 307-308).

Watson was identified by former Soviet spy Anthony Blunt as having been an ardent Marxist at Cambridge and, on the basis of other circumstantial evidence, questioned over a period of six weeks by MI5's interrogator Cecil Shipp in 1965. Whilst he confessed to having met with Soviet KGB officials, he denied passing secrets to them. Watson's security clearance was immediately revoked, and he was removed from his post and transferred to the National Institute of Oceanography (previously housed by the ARL, now a part of the National Oceanography Centre), where he worked until retirement. Watson's publications while working there included "Air-sea interaction" (Science Progress Vol. 56, No. 223 (July 1968), pp. 303–323).

== Family ==
Alister Watson was married twice. He had one daughter by his first marriage and a daughter and a son by his second.

He died in Haslemere, Surrey.
