= Edward Lee (scientist) =

British physicist

Edward Lee (2 March 1914 – 31 December 2001) was a British scientist, inventor, and civil servant. He was the builder of Britain's first infrared spectrometer, and later served as Director of the Admiralty Research Laboratory.

== Education ==
Lee was educated at Consett Grammar School. He earned an MSc from Manchester University, where he was a protégé of scientists Lawrence Bragg and Patrick Blackett. He was headhunted by Sir Gordon Sutherland to build an infrared spectrometer at Pembroke College, University of Cambridge, where he received his PhD.

== Second World War career ==
At the outbreak of the Second World War, Lee had won a Commonwealth scholarship to continue his research at the Massachusetts Institute of Technology, but chose instead to remain in Britain to help with the war effort. In 1939, Lee joined the Scientific and Technical Staff at the Royal Navy's Admiralty Research Laboratory in Teddington, Middlesex. He served in the Scientific Research and Experiment Department working on radar & Type F infrared rays recognition system.

== Post-war career ==
From 1946 to 1948, Lee served on the staff of the UK Ministry of Defence. In 1948, he joined the Admiralty's Department of Physical Research. In 1951, he returned to the Admiralty Research Laboratory, and in 1955 he was appointed Director of Operational Research, Royal Naval Scientific Service.

In 1958, Lee was appointed Deputy Director of the National Physical Laboratory. In 1960, he was appointed Director, Stations and Industry Division, Department of Scientific and Industrial Research. In 1965, during Harold Wilson's "white heat of technology", he became Deputy Controller (R) at the Ministry of Technology. In 1970 he was appointed Head of Research Services at the Department of Trade and Industry.

From 1971 until his retirement in 1974, Lee served as Director of the Admiralty Research Laboratory.

== Retirement ==
In later life, Lee served as Governor of Hampton School, and Captain and President of the Home Park Golf Club at Hampton Court.
