= Knowledge Management Research & Practice =

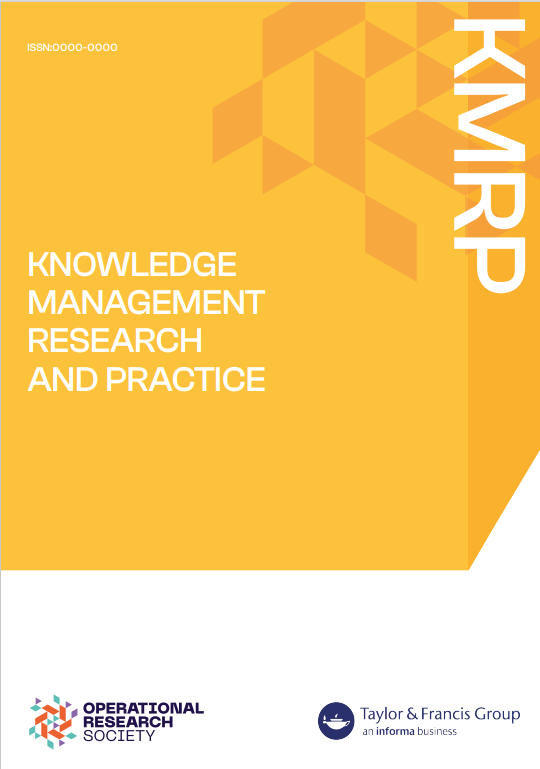
- Discipline: Knowledge management
- Language: English
- Edited by: Tom Jackson, Antti Lönnqvist

Publication details
- History: 2003-present
- Publisher: Taylor & Francis
- Frequency: Quarterly
- Open access: Hybrid
- Impact factor: 3.2 (2023)

Standard abbreviations
- ISO 4: Knowl. Manag. Res. Pract.

Indexing
- ISSN: 1477-8238 (print); 1477-8246 (web)

Links
- Journal homepage; Online access

Knowledge Management Research & Practice is a quarterly peer-reviewed academic journal covering all aspects of knowledge management, organisational learning, intellectual capital, and knowledge economics. It is an official journal of the Operational Research Society.

== Abstracting and indexing ==
The journal is currently abstracted and indexed in Ei Compendex, Embase, GEOBASE, Social Sciences Citation Index, and Scopus. According to the Journal Citation Reports, the journal has a 2023 impact factor of 3.2.
