= Albert Beaumont Wood =

- Born: 1890; Uppermill, Yorkshire, England
- Died: 19 July 1964 (aged 73–74)
- Education: Manchester University
- Known for: asdics
- Awards: Pioneers of Underwater Acoustics Medal; Duddell Medal (1951)
- Scientific career
- Fields: Physicist
- Workplaces: University of Manchester; Board of Invention and Research; Admiralty Research Laboratory; H M Signal School; H M Mining School; RNSS Headquarters; Applied Research Laboratory
- Doctoral students: Mazhar Mahmood Qurashi

Albert Beaumont Wood OBE DSc (1890 – 19 July 1964), better known as A B Wood, was a British physicist, known for his pioneering work in the field of underwater acoustics and sonar. Wood is known for his work on developing sonar (known at that time as 'ASDICS') in the UK from the First World War until after the Second World War.

== Education ==
He graduated from Manchester University with First Class Honours in 1912, where he joined a team of notable scientists led by Sir Ernest Rutherford (later Lord Rutherford), including Henry Moseley, Hans Geiger, Niels Bohr, Ernest Marsden, James Chadwick, George de Hevesy and Charles Galton Darwin. In 1914 he was appointed a research fellow at the University of Liverpool and then a lecturer in physics. He still kept in touch with Rutherford, who was working on underwater acoustics, and arranged for him to work on countering the German naval threat. He was awarded his DSc degree by his university in 1919 and became a Fellow of the Physical Society in 1920. He was a founder member of the Institute of Physics.

== War service ==
He joined the Board of Invention and Research in October 1915, shortly after its creation, to help with the UK war effort against Germany. Wood served the Admiralty in Aberdour in 1915 establishing the Admiralty Experimental Station that later moved to Parkstone Quay and Shandon as head of the experimental station he worked on a variety of acoustics projects. He joined the Admiralty Research Laboratory in Teddington when this body was formed in 1921, where he eventually became Deputy Superintendent. He was Deputy Superintendent of H M Signal School, Chief Scientist of H M Mining School and Deputy Director of Physical Research for the Royal Scientific Civil Service.

Following the ideas of Hans Hollmann, he proposed in 1937 a system with "six or eight small holes" drilled in a metal block, differing from the later production cavity magnetrons only in the aspects of vacuum sealing. However, his idea was rejected by the Navy, who said their valve department was far too busy to consider it.

Though he formally retired from the Admiralty Research Laboratories in 1950, he returned to continue his work on underwater sound. He spend a year at the US Naval Electronics Laboratory shortly before his death. In 1939 A B Wood was awarded the title Officer of the Order of the British Empire, in recognition of his work on dismantling a German magnetic mine at the start of the Second World War.

== Awards ==
In 1951 he was awarded the Duddell Medal by the Institute of Physics and in 1961 the Pioneers of Underwater Acoustics Medal by the Acoustical Society of America. The A B Wood Medal is awarded by the Institute of Acoustics in his name.

== Publications ==
- A. B. Wood, A Textbook of Sound, Bell, 1930, 3rd revised edition 1955.

== Family life ==
Wood married his wife Ethel in 1916. In 2022 a blue plaque commemorating Wood's achievements was unveiled at Wood's former home in Uppermill, Saddleworth, Yorkshire.
