= Mazhar Mahmood Qurashi =

- Born: 8 October 1925; Gujranwala, Punjab, British India (now Pakistan)
- Died: 21 November 2011 (aged 86); Islamabad, Islamabad Capital Territory
- Citizenship: Pakistan
- Education: University of Punjab; University of Manchester
- Known for: his work in physics, history, crystallographic, crystalline, and operational research and Scientometrics.
- Awards: Sitara-i-Imtiaz (1991); Pride of Performance (2007)
- Scientific career
- Fields: Physics
- Workplaces: Pakistan Atomic Energy Commission; Pakistan Academy of Sciences; Pakistan Council of Scientific and Industrial Research; Ministry of Defence (MDP); Quaid-i-Azam University (Qau); Institute of Physics (IP); Crystallographic Society of Pakistan (CSP)
- Doctoral advisor: Dr. Albert Beaumont Wood

Notes
- Note: He is the founder of Crystallographic Society of Pakistan.

Mazhar Mahmood Qurashi (Urdu: مظهر محمود قريشى; b. 8 October 1925 – 21 November 2011; SI), best known as M. M. Qureshi was a Pakistani physicist and an Islamic scholar who was educated in Lahore and Manchester. He earned prestige and notability after authoring important publication on Islam and science and abstract theories to explain the religious phenomenon and events, explained in Koran— a Quran of Muslims.

Previously, he laid the foundation of Desto and served as senior scientist at the Ministry of Defence (MoD), as well as also served as director of Pakistan Council of Scientific and Industrial Research. He served as professor of physics at the Quaid-i-Azam University. He was an eminent science administrator and researcher in the field of classical physics. Qurashi served as secretary general of the Pakistan Academy of Sciences and the past director general of Pakistan Council of Scientific and Industrial Research (PCSIR) laboratories in Karachi as well as being a former director of the National Science Council of Pakistan.

He has played pivotal role in establishing Islamic Lunar Calendar and remained member of Central Moon sighting Committee of Pakistan for about three decades. He remained heavily engaged in the History and Philosophy of Science where he highlighted the role of Islam and Muslims in development of Science and inter-relationship between Islamic and Scientific principles. He remained part of the editorial board of Pakistan Journal of History and Philosophy of Science.

== Biography ==
=== Education ===
Qureshi completed his matriculation at an early age and also received an early admission to the University of the Punjab with an awarded scholarship. In 1942, he graduated and received BSc with Honors in physics. In 1944, he completed his Master's degree in physics. He served as an associate professor of physics at his alma mater for a from 1944 till 1947, then and flew to United Kingdom to pursue his doctorate in physics. He was awarded PhD in physics under the supervision of Dr. Albert Beaumont Wood from University of Manchester in 1949; also awarded D.Sc. in physics in 1962, on the basis of 50 published papers.

== Academic career ==
He has been associated with University of Islamabad (now Quaid-i-Azam University) since its establishment. In the past, he has served as the chairman of the physics department at the Quaid-i-Azam University. He has also served as a research scientist at the Institute of Physics and published numerous papers in physics. In July 1988, Qureshi founded the first new Crystallographic Society of Pakistan in which he also served as its new president.

Prof. Qurashi is a former member of the Pakistan Council of Scientific and Industrial Research, Technological and Research Committee on Cotton as well as being a member of Pakistan team at the Defence Exercise UNISON in 1965. In 1981, dr. Qureshi was listed in the Biography in Who's Who in the World, Biography in Men of Achievement (1982), Who's Who of Intellectuals (1983), and 5,000 Personalities of the World, 1985.

== Research papers ==
- Dependence of publication-rate on size of some university groups and departments in U. K. and Greece in comparison with N. C. I., USA . M.M. Qureshi (2005)
- Groundrules for Gainful Interaction Between Science and Religion for the Future of Humanity by Prof. Mazhar Mahmood Qurashi FIAS, Pakistan Academy of Sciences.
- Evaluation of Water Bodies from Different Sources of Water (2005)
- Islamic lunar calendar – a critical review of forecasts for Pakistan based on the ILDL concept, Part II, by M. M. Qurashi
- Science, Islam and Education by S. M. Jafar and M. M. Qurashi (2005).
- History and Philosophy of Muslim Contributions to Science & Technology, by M. M. Qurashi and S. S. H. Rizvi (1996).
- Introduction to Muslim Contributions to science & Technology, by Mazhar Qureshi, printed by Adam Publishers.
- Research & Development in Pakistan: Review (1947–89) & Future Perspectives. M. M. Qurashi and A. Q. Kazi (1992).
- Food & Nutrition Problems of the Muslim Ummah. S. M. Ali, M.H. Qazi, M.M. Qurashi, M.A. Rahim, F.H. Shah (1989).
- Science and Technology Profiles of Muslim Countries. S.M. Jafar & M. M. Qurashi (1986)
- Renewable Sources of Energy in Pakistan. M. M. Qurashi & A. H. Chotani (1986).
- Energy and Its Development (with special reference to Pakistan). Karimullah, M. M. Qurashi, M.S.H. Siddiqi, M. K. Bhatty, A.H.Chotani (1982)
- Appropriate Technology & Development (with special reference to Pakistan) by M. M. Qurashi, Karimullah, M. Aslam, A. H. Chotani, S. M. Moghni (1981) (Edited in collaboration with PAS & Pakistan Banking Council).
- The Mechanics of R&D and Technology Transfer. Mazhar M. Qurashi (1978).

== Awards ==
- Sitara-i-Imtiaz (1991)
- PCSIR Award (2002)
- Gold Medal from Pakistan Academy of Sciences (1972)

== Fellowships ==
- Fellow of Institute of Physics (1961)
- Fellow of Islamic Academy of Sciences (1988)
- President, of the Scientific Society of Pakistan, (1968–1969)
- President, Section of Physics, Mathematics, Statistics, Astronomy and Meteorology.
