= Arthur Stewart Eve =

English physicist

Arthur Stewart Eve CBE FRS FRSC
- Born: 22 November 1862; Silsoe
- Died: 24 March 1948 (aged 85); Puttenham, Surrey
- Resting place: St James the Great Churchyard, Silsoe
- Education: Pembroke College, Cambridge
- Known for: Authoritative biography of Rutherford
- Spouse: Elizabeth Agnes Brooks
- Children: Richard, Joan and Cicely
- Scientific career
- Fields: Radioactivity
- Workplaces: Marlborough College; McGill University; Admiralty Experimental Station

Arthur Stewart Eve CBE FRS FRSC (22 November 1862 – 24 March 1948) was an English physicist who worked in Canada.

== Biography ==
Eve was born at Silsoe, Bedfordshire, on 22 November 1862, son of John Richard Eve, surveyor and land agent, and Frederica (née Somers). He was educated at Berkhamsted School and entered Pembroke College, Cambridge in 1881. He was fifteenth wrangler and graduated in 1884.

Eve was Assistant Master at Marlborough College from 1886 to 1902, and Bursar from 1897 to 1902. He then resigned and sailed on the SS Ivernia in January 1903 to New York, from where he went to McGill University, as a lecturer in mathematics. He later joined the physics department, where he worked with Ernest Rutherford. His early papers, published in 1904, showed Eve as the author, but were communicated by Rutherford. After a series of successful researches with Rutherford, Eve was appointed Associate Professor of Physics in 1909 and, in the following year, was elected a Fellow of the Royal Society of Canada.

Work was interrupted by the First World War. Eve went overseas as second in command of the 148th Battalion with the rank of major. But by 1917 he was 55. He was persuaded by Sir William Bragg to forego active service, and succeed him as Director of the Admiralty Experimental Station at Harwich, where his team worked on detection of submarines. In that same year, Eve was elected a Fellow of the Royal Society, and in 1918 was appointed CBE, and made a colonel in the Canadian Expeditionary Force.

In 1919, he went back to McGill as Director of Physics, a post he held until 1935. Aided by the Principal of McGill, Sir Arthur Currie, Eve began rebuilding the department. He appointed Étienne Biéler and Dr David Keys in charge of important sections of the research. Biéler died unexpectedly in 1929, and was replaced by William Heriot Watson, a Scottish-born physicist.

Eve was 67 by the time the department was as he wanted it, but he managed to pick up his research interests again. With Keys, he published Applied Geophysics, Cambridge University Press, 1932; and, with Mendenhall and Keys, College Physics, Boston: D C Heath & Co., 1935. He retired in 1935 and was made Professor Emeritus of Physics; he had earlier been the Dean of the Graduate Faculty (1930-1935).

Eve retired to London. When Ernest Rutherford died in 1937 he was persuaded to document his colleague and friend’s life; the book appeared in 1939. Eve then undertook to write up the life of the Irish physicist John Tyndall. He produced the first draft, but a stroke prevented him from finishing the book, which was completed by C H Creasey and published in 1945.

=== Family ===
Eve married Elizabeth Agnes Brooks, a graduate of McGill, on 25 April 1905 at Dunham, Quebec. His sister in law was nuclear physicist Harriet Brooks, a student of Ernest Rutherford, who considered her the equal to Marie Curie in her abilities.

The couple had three children: Richard Stewart, Joan and Cicely Somers. Cicely was the second wife of British sculptor Antony Gibbons Grinling. They married in Hampstead on 28 May 1938 and had three daughters: Amanda, Julia and Tessa.

Arthur Stewart Eve died in Puttenham on 24 March 1948. He was buried in St James the Great Churchyard, in his home town of Silsoe.

== Positions held ==
- Assistant Master, Marlborough College, 1886–1902; Bursar, 1897, 1902
- Lecturer Mathematics, McGill University, 1903
- Assistant Professor, 1905, Associate Professor, 1909
- Fellow of the Royal Society of Canada, 1910
- Captain, McGill COTC
- Captain 3rd, 4th Overseas Universities Companies CEF reinforcing PPCLI
- Major, 2nd in Command 148th Overseas Battalion CEF
- 2nd in Command 20th Canadian Reserve Battalion RHC, 1917
- Director of Research, Admiralty Experimental Station, Harwich, 1917–18
- Colonel (CEF), 1918; Lt-Col (reserve) 1920; Colonel (retired), 1928
- Director of Physics, McGill University, 1919–35
- President, Royal Society of Canada, 1929–30
- Honorary LLD, Queen's University
- Hon. LLD and Emeritus Professor of Physics, McGill University

Professional and academic associations
| Preceded by Camille Roy | President of the Royal Society of Canada; 1929–1930 | Succeeded by Charles Camsell |
