= Rebecca Shipley =

British mathematician and professor

Rebecca Shipley OBE FREng FIET
- Born: Buckinghamshire, England
- Citizenship: United Kingdom
- Education: University of Oxford
- Occupation: Professor of Healthcare Engineering
- Employer: University College London

Rebecca Julia Shipley is a British mathematician and expert in healthcare engineering and innovation. She is Professor of healthcare engineering at University College London (UCL) and Chief Research Officer at UCLPartners. During 2018-2024 she was Director of the UCL Institute of Healthcare Engineering and Vice Dean (Health) for the UCL Faculty of Engineering Sciences. She has co-led multidisciplinary research initiatives at UCL including the Centre for Nerve Engineering, Centre for Computational Medicine and UCL CHIMERA Research Hub. She was awarded an OBE in the Queen's Birthday Honours List in 2021 for pandemic response work and is a Fellow of the Royal Academy of Engineering.

== Early life and education ==
Shipley grew up in Buckinghamshire, where she attended Dr Challoner's High School for Girls. She graduated with an MMath in Mathematics from St Hugh's College, University of Oxford and was awarded a doctorate from the Oxford Centre for Industrial and Applied Mathematics, Mathematical Institute, University of Oxford in 2008 for her thesis "Multiscale Modelling of Fluid and Drug Transport in Vascular Tumours".

== Research career ==
Her first postdoctoral position was a Junior Research Fellowship at Christ Church, University of Oxford to develop mathematical and computational models that describe biomechanical and biochemical stimulation of tissues. She also held two concurrent Visiting Research Fellowships at the Centre for Regenerative Medicine, Bath, and Tissue Repair and Engineering Centre, UCL during that time.

In 2012, Shipley moved from mathematics into healthcare engineering, taking up a Lectureship in UCL Mechanical Engineering. Her research focuses on mathematical and computational modelling to better understand how diseased and damaged tissues function and repair, including in cancer and nerve injury, as well as data-driven models in physiology and digital health technologies.

Within the field of tumour blood flow and therapy prediction, she is developing new bioengineering platforms which combine computational modelling with in vivo and ex vivo imaging data to better understand and interrogate cancer therapies. Her work advancing cancer therapies has been recognised in the national press.

Within nervous system tissue engineering, she has developed an interdisciplinary programme spanning bioengineering, computational modelling and tissue engineering to characterise the response of repairing nerves to chemical and mechanical stimuli, and integrate these data to design and test repair constructs. This is complemented by her work using computational modelling to understand the role of biochemical and biophysical stimuli, and define operating parameters, in tissue engineering development.

Shipley has been a strong advocate for healthcare engineering and the translation of scientific discoveries into practice, working in particular across UCL and partner hospitals. She co-founded the UCL Centre for Nerve Engineering to bring together engineering and physical sciences with the life and clinical sciences to tackle translational nerve engineering problem. During 2018-2024 she led the UCL Institute of Healthcare Engineering which acts as an interface between engineering, computating and healthcare research at UCL.

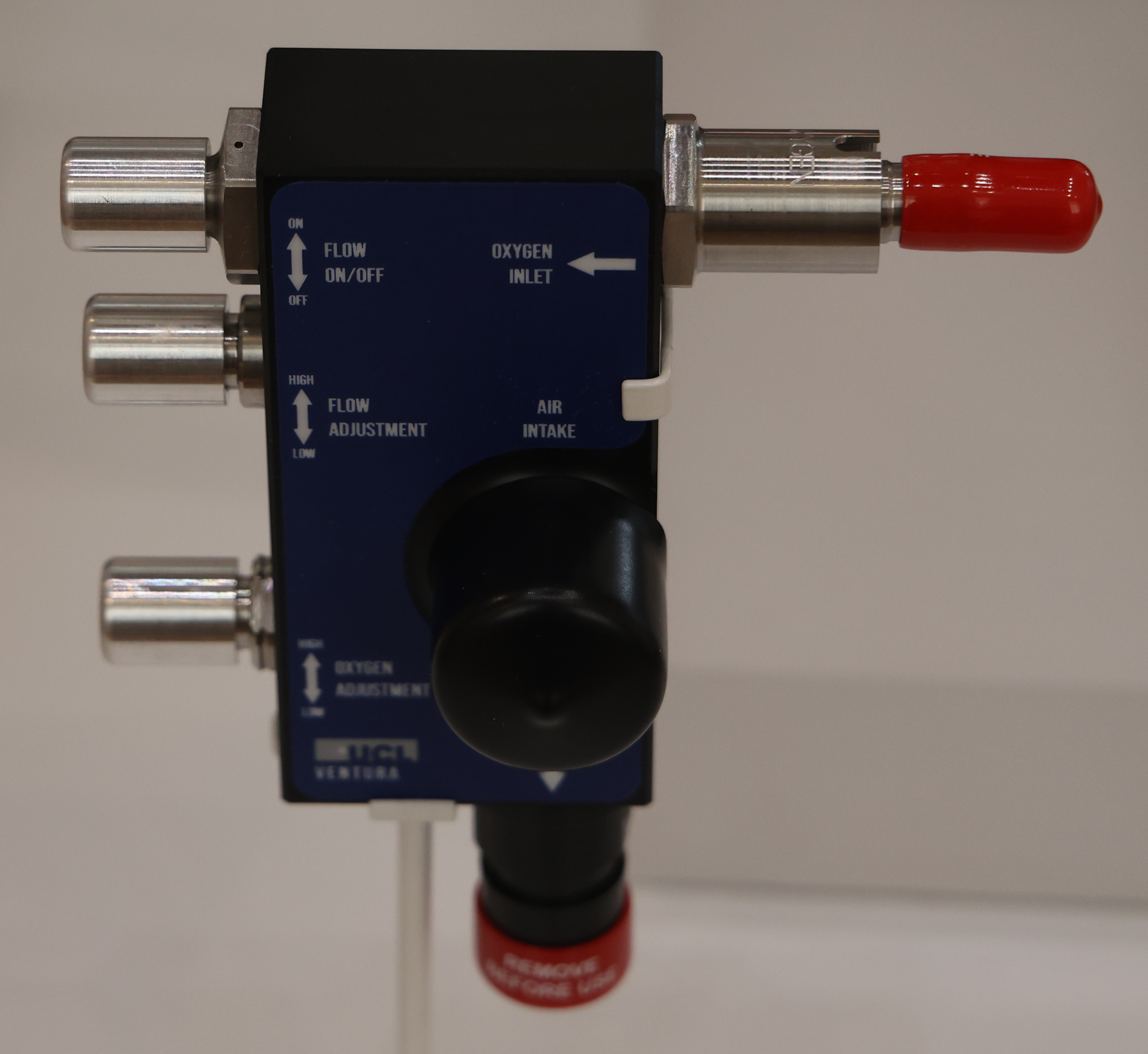
MK1 UCL-Ventura CPAP device

In March 2020, Shipley co-led the UCL Ventura CPAP program across UCL / UCL Hospitals NHS Trust / Mercedes F1. The team reverse engineered and manufactured 10,000 non-invasive ventilators (continuous positive airways pressure devices) and associated devices and consumables which were distributed across the NHS during the COVID-19 pandemic. The designs and manufacturing instructions was made available globally through an zero cost license with over 2,000 downloads across 105 countries, and the team supported extensive international donations. The devices were used to treat patients in over 30 countries.

== Honours, awards and recognition ==
- “Young Researcher of the Year” by the Tissue and Cell Engineering Society UK (TCES) in 2011
- Rosetrees Trust Interdisciplinary Prize 2016
- 5-year EPSRC Fellowship 2018-2023
- Royal Academy of Engineering President's Special Awards for Pandemic Services (UCL Ventura CPAP team)
- Women's Engineering Society Top 50 Women in Engineering 2021: Women's Heros
- Shipley was appointed Officer of the Order of the British Empire (OBE) in the 2021 Birthday Honours for services to the development of the Continuous Positive Airways Pressure Device during the pandemic.
- In 2024 she was elected a fellow of the Royal Academy of Engineering

== Public outreach and engagement ==
Shipley is active in bringing mathematics, engineering and their intersection with healthcare, to wider audiences. Her outreach activities include:

- Engineers' Gallery, Science Museum (London) - with the Queen Elizabeth Prize for Engineering - focused on engineering and innovation
- Tomorrow's Home for 2050, funded by the Royal Academy of Engineering, working with the Museum of the Home - an immersive installation on the home of the future to engage the public in research and innovation around technologies to support healthy ageing
- Participating in a UK wide event, Tomorrow’s Engineers Week Big Assembly, in November 2019 to inspire young people to enter engineering careers
- Royal Society Summer Exhibition stall on the Mathematics of Cancer
- Podcasts for BBC Radio 2 (Naked Scientists)
