= Journal of the Operational Research Society =

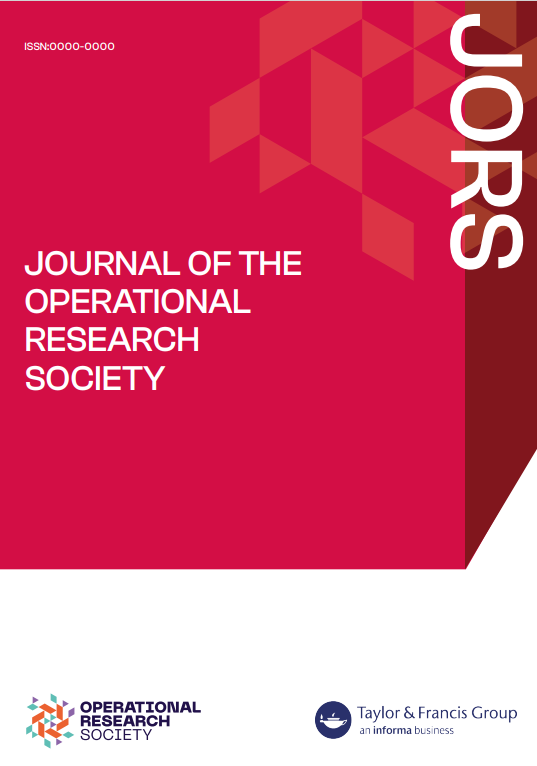
- Discipline: Operations research, management
- Language: English
- Edited by: Martin H. Kunc, Said Salhi, Zhe George Zhang, Kostas Nikolopoulos

Publication details
- Former name: Operational Research Quarterly
- History: 1950–present
- Publisher: Taylor & Francis
- Frequency: Monthly
- Open access: Hybrid
- Impact factor: 2.7 (2023)

Standard abbreviations
- ISO 4: J. Oper. Res. Soc.

Indexing
- ISSN: 0160-5682 (print); 1476-9360 (web)
- LCCN: 78643148
- OCLC no.: 03685489

Links
- Journal homepage; Online access; Online archive

The Journal of the Operational Research Society is a monthly peer-reviewed academic journal covering operations research. It is an official journal of the Operational Research Society and publishes full length case-oriented papers, full length theoretical papers, technical notes, discussions (viewpoints) and book reviews. It was established in 1950 as the Operational Research Quarterly (from 1953 to 1969 under the title OR). It was published four times a year until 1978 when it became a monthly publication and the name was changed to Journal of the Operational Research Society. In 2024, the journal celebrated its 75th anniversary.

== Abstracting and indexing ==
The journal is abstracted and indexed in:

- Current Contents/Engineering, Computing & Technology
- Current Contents/Social & Behavioural Sciences
- Ei Compendex
- Inspec
- Science Citation Index Expanded
- Social Sciences Citation Index
- Scopus
- Zentralblatt MATH

According to the Journal Citation Reports, the journal has a 2023 impact factor of 2.7.
