= International Abstracts in Operations Research =

- Discipline: Operations research, management
- Language: English
- Edited by: K. Preston White

Publication details
- History: 1961-present
- Publisher: Palgrave Macmillan
- Frequency: 8/year

Standard abbreviations
- ISO 4: Int. Abstr. Oper. Res.

Indexing
- ISSN: 0020-580X (print); 1476-9352 (web)
- OCLC no.: 1753369

Links
- Journal homepage; Online access

International Abstracts in Operations Research is an official publication of the International Federation of Operational Research Societies.

== History ==
The journal was established in 1961 by the Operations Research Society of America with Herbert P. Galliher as the first editor-in-chief. The first issue appeared in November 1961. In 1969 responsibility for its production was transferred to the International Federation of Operational Research Societies. The journal is now mainly used as an online database but a printed edition is still produced annually.

== Journals abstracted ==
IAOR Online includes abstracts from approximately 180 different journals in each volume. The journals produced by the member societies and the major commercial publications in the field, are abstracted in full. Other journals are scanned regularly and abstracts selected, while others provide occasional abstracts.
