= Owen Wansbrough-Jones =

British chemist and soldier

Sir Owen Haddon Wansbrough-Jones KBE, CB (1906, Long Stratton, Norfolk, England – 1983, Long Stratton), was a leading academic chemist and soldier whose career included serving as Chief Scientist to the British Ministry of Supply.

Educated at Norwich School, Gresham's School, Holt, and Trinity Hall, Cambridge, he took the degrees of B.A., BSc, and PhD at Cambridge, where he worked under Eric Rideal.

During his career in the Army and later in the Civil Service, he specialised in weapon development.

== Career ==
- 1930 - 1946 Fellow of Trinity Hall, Cambridge
- 1939 - 1945 Served with British Army (with rank of Brigadier)
- 1945 - 1951 Scientific Adviser to the Army Council
- 1951 - 1953 Principal Director for Scientific Research, Ministry of Supply
- 1953 - 1959 Chief Scientist, Ministry of Supply
- 1959 - 1970 Chairman of Albright & Wilson Ltd

== Other Positions ==
- Chairman of the Operational Research Society
- Vice-president, British Industrial Biological Research Association (BIBRA)
- Fellow of the Chemical Society
- Treasurer of the Faraday Society (1949 - 1960)
- Member of the Society of Chemical Industry
- Section Chair of the Society of Chemical Industry (1962 - 1966)

== Arms ==
Coat of arms of Owen Wansbrough-Jones

Motto
Et Schola Parnassus

== Sources ==
- The Growth of Operational Research 1939-1964, by Sir Charles Goodeve
- Owen Wansbrough-Jones at the Open University Biographical Database
- Harries, R.; Cattermole, P.; Mackintosh, P. (1991). A History of Norwich School: King Edward VI's Grammar School at Norwich. Norwich: Friends of Norwich School. ISBN 978-0-9518561-1-6.
