= Admiralty Experimental Station =

Research department of the British Admiralty

Research Department overview
- Formed: 1915
- Dissolved: 1921
- Superseding Research Department: Admiralty Research Laboratory
- Jurisdiction: Government of the United Kingdom
- Headquarters: Aberdour, Fife, Scotland (1915-1917); Parkeston Quay, England (1917-1919); Shandon, Scotland (1919-1921)
- Parent department: Admiralty

The Admiralty Experimental Station was a research department of the British Admiralty set up in 1915. Initially its research centred round submarine detection methods. In 1921 its remit was expanded and it was renamed the Admiralty Research Laboratory.

== History ==
During the First World War, the Anti-Submarine Division of the Admiralty Naval Staff had established experimental stations. In 1915 The first Admiralty Experimental Station was set up by the Admiralty at Aberdour, Fife, Scotland under the supervision of the Physicist Dr. Albert Beaumont Wood. In 1917 it moved its location to Parkeston Quay, England. The experimental station worked with the Lancashire Anti-Submarine Committee and the Clyde Anti-Submarine Committee. In 1919 it moved its headquarters back to Scotland at Shandon, Dunbartonshire. In 1921 its remit was expanded and it was renamed the Admiralty Research Laboratory when it moved to Teddington, England.

== Locations of Experimental Stations ==
- 1915 Experimental Station Abedour (also known as the Admiralty Experimental Station Hawkcraig).
- 1917 Experimental Station Parkeston Quay, Harwich.
- 1919 Experimental Station Shandon.

== Out Stations ==
- Experimental Out Station Dartmouth.
- Experimental Out Station Wemyss Bay

== Sources ==
1. Admiralty: Admiralty Experimental Station and Admiralty Research Laboratory: Correspondence and Papers". discovery.nationalarchives.gov.uk. National Archives UK. 1915–1977. ADM 212.
2. Archives, The National. "Admiralty Experimental Station Hawkcraig". discovery.nationalarchives.gov.uk. National Archives UK. ADM 218.
3. Wood, Albert Beaumont (1912–1964). "Admiralty: Scientific Research and Experiment Department and Royal Naval Scientific Service: Papers of Dr Albert B Wood, Physicist". www.discovery.nationalarchives.gov.uk/details/r/C1926. National Archives UK.
