= Operational Research Society =

International learned society for operational research

- Formation: 1948
- Type: Learned society
- Headquarters: London
- Members: 4,500+
- Key people: Dr Colette Fletcher, Executive Director, Sanja Petrovic, President
- Website: www.theorsociety.com

The Operational Research Society (ORS), also known as The OR Society, is an international learned society in the field of operational research (OR), with more than 4,500+ members (2026). It has its headquarters in Birmingham, England.

== History ==
The OR Society was created in April 1948 as the Operational Research Club, becoming the OR Society in 1953. It is the world's oldest-established learned society catering to the OR profession and one of the largest in the world, with members in 53 countries. A full history of the OR Society can be found on the OR Society website.

Founding members of the OR society included: Charles F. Goodeve, Patrick Blackett, and Charles Tizard.

== Governance ==
The OR Society is registered charity number 313713 and also a company limited by guarantee (Company number 00663819). Its charitable objectives are the advancement of knowledge and interest in OR and the advancement of education in OR.

The management of the society is overseen by a General Council. Its affairs are managed by a board, consisting of five officers elected by the membership and up to six members of the General Council.

=== Presidents ===
Previous presidents have included Sir Owen Wansbrough-Jones, Maurice Kendall, John Giffard, 3rd Earl of Halsbury, George Alfred Barnard, and K. D. Tocher.

- 1953–1955 Owen Wansbrough-Jones
- 1956–1957 William K. Slater
- 1958–1959 Maurice Kendall
- 1960–1961 John Giffard, 3rd Earl of Halsbury
- 1962–1963 Patrick Rivett
- 1964–1965 George A. Barnard
- 1966–1967 Roger Eddison
- 1968–1969 Evan C. Williams
- 1970–1971 Stafford Beer
- 1972–1973 K. D. Tocher
- 1974–1975 Rolfe C. Tomlinson
- 1976–1977 Alec M. Lee
- 1978–1979 Mike G. Simpson
- 1980–1981 George H. Mitchell
- 1982–1983 K. Brian Haley
- 1984–1985 Roy Stainton
- 1986–1987 Jonathan V. Rosenhead
- 1988–1989 John C. Ranyard
- 1990–1991 Paul N. Thornton
- 1992–1993 Chris Chapman
- 1994–1995 Lyn Thomas
- 1996–1997 Ian J. Disley
- 1998–1999 Robert G. Dyson
- 2000–2001 Mike Pidd
- 2004–2005 Valerie Belton
- 2006–2007 Jeff Griffiths
- 2008–2009 Susan Merchant
- 2010–2011 Richard W. Eglese
- 2012–2013 Geoff Royston
- 2014–2015 Stewart Robinson
- 2016–2017 Ruth Kaufman
- 2018–2019 John R. Hopes
- 2020–2021 Edmund Burke
- 2023–2024 Gilbert Owusu
- 2025–2026 Sanja Petrovic
- 2027–2028 Christina Pagel

=== Subgroups ===
The OR society has two sorts of subgroups: Regional Societies and Special Interest Groups.

The OR Society has a number of regional societies which enable members to promote O.R. and build contacts with other operational researchers working in their (or related) area(s) and to expand their knowledge in O.R.

== Publications ==
The society publishes the Journal of the Operational Research Society, Knowledge Management Research and Practice, Journal of Simulation, European Journal of Information Systems, O.R. Insight, Health Systems, Journal of Business Analytics and Inside O.R. (a monthly news magazine). The society's publisher is Taylor & Francis.

== Interaction with other bodies ==
The OR Society works with a number of other bodies, to achieve common aims, including (amongst others):

- International Federation of Operational Research Societies, an umbrella organisation for 45 plus O.R. societies from different countries across the world.
- Association of European Operational Research Societies, (a regional grouping within the International Federation of Operational Research Societies (IFORS)).
- The Council for Mathematical Sciences. This council provides advice to government, education funding committees (such as ESPRC) on mathematical matters including education and policy, and brings together mathematicians with stakeholders in mathematics to explore issues and solutions. The council includes The O.R. Society, the Institute of Mathematics and its Applications, The Royal Statistical Society, The London Mathematical Society and the Edinburgh Mathematical Society.

== Awards ==
To promote and disseminate O.R. knowledge and working practices the OR Society gives awards (medals, prizes and grants). These awards include (but are not limited to):

- The Beale Medal - for sustained contribution to O.R.
- The President’s Medal – for the best account of O.R. practice given at the Society’s annual conference
- The PhD Prize - most distinguished body of research leading to the award of a doctorate in the field of O.R.
- Scholarships to enable distinguished contributors to present their work at the IFORS Triennial Conference
- Donald Hicks Scholarships for young researchers and practitioners
- The May Hicks awards for student projects
- The Simpson Award for young researchers and practitioners
- The Lyn Thomas Impact Medal - awarded to the academic or research which best demonstrates novelty and real-world impact, backed up by evidence

== See also ==
- List of mathematical societies
- Council for the Mathematical Sciences
