= Operations research =

Discipline concerning the application of advanced analytical methods

Operations research (British English: operational research), often shortened to the initialism OR, is a branch of applied mathematics that deals with the development and application of analytical methods to improve management and decision-making. The term management science is occasionally used as a synonym.

Employing techniques from other mathematical sciences, such as modeling, statistics, and optimization, operations research arrives at optimal or near-optimal solutions to decision-making problems. Because of its emphasis on practical applications, operations research has overlapped with many other disciplines, notably industrial engineering. Operations research is often concerned with determining the extreme values of some real-world objective: the maximum (of profit, performance, or yield) or minimum (of loss, risk, or cost). Originating in military efforts before World War II, its techniques have grown to concern problems in a variety of industries.

== Overview ==
Operations research (OR) encompasses the development and the use of a wide range of problem-solving techniques and methods applied in the pursuit of improved decision-making and efficiency, such as simulation, mathematical optimization, queueing theory and other stochastic-process models, Markov decision processes, econometric methods, data envelopment analysis, ordinal priority approach, neural networks, expert systems, decision analysis, and the analytic hierarchy process. Nearly all of these techniques involve the construction of mathematical models that attempt to describe the system. Because of the computational and statistical nature of most of these fields, OR also has strong ties to computer science and analytics. Operational researchers faced with a new problem must determine which of these techniques are most appropriate given the nature of the system, the goals for improvement, and constraints on time and computing power, or develop a new technique specific to the problem at hand (and, afterwards, to that type of problem).

The major sub-disciplines (but not limited to) in modern operational research, as identified by the journal Operations Research and The Journal of the Operational Research Society are:

- Computing and information technologies
- Financial engineering
- Manufacturing, service sciences, and supply chain management
- Policy modeling and public sector work
- Revenue management
- Simulation
- Stochastic models
- Transportation theory
- Game theory for strategies
- Linear programming
- Nonlinear programming
- Integer programming in NP-complete problem specially for 0-1 integer linear programming for binary
- Dynamic programming in Aerospace engineering and Economics
- Information theory used in Cryptography, Quantum computing
- Quadratic programming for solutions of Quadratic equation and Quadratic function

== History ==
In the decades after the two World Wars, the tools of operations research were more widely applied to problems in business, industry, and society. Since that time, operational research has expanded into a field widely used in industries ranging from petrochemicals to airlines, finance, logistics, and government, with a focus on the development of mathematical models that can be used to analyze and optimize sometimes complex systems, and it has become an area of active academic and industrial research.

=== Historical origins ===
In the 17th century, mathematicians Blaise Pascal and Christiaan Huygens solved problems involving sometimes complex decisions (problem of points) by using game-theoretic ideas and expected values; others, such as Pierre de Fermat and Jacob Bernoulli, solved these types of problems using combinatorial reasoning instead. Charles Babbage's research into the cost of transportation and sorting of mail led to England's universal "Penny Post" in 1840, and to studies into the dynamical behaviour of railway vehicles in defence of the GWR's broad gauge. Beginning in the 20th century, study of inventory management could be considered the origin of modern operations research with economic order quantity developed by Ford W. Harris in 1913. Percy Bridgman brought operational research to bear on problems in physics in the 1920s and would later attempt to extend these to the social sciences.

Modern operational research originated at the Bawdsey Research Station in the UK in 1937 as the result of an initiative of the station's superintendent, A. P. Rowe and Robert Watson-Watt. Rowe conceived the idea as a means to analyse and improve the working of the UK's early-warning radar system, code-named "Chain Home" (CH). Initially, Rowe analysed the operating of the radar equipment and its communication networks, expanding later to include the operating personnel's behaviour. This revealed unappreciated limitations of the CH network and allowed remedial action to be taken.

Scientists in the United Kingdom (including Patrick Blackett (later Lord Blackett OM PRS), Cecil Gordon, Solly Zuckerman, (later Baron Zuckerman OM, KCB, FRS), C. H. Waddington, Owen Wansbrough-Jones, Frank Yates, Jacob Bronowski and Freeman Dyson), and in the United States (George Dantzig) looked for ways to make better decisions in such areas as logistics and training schedules.

=== Second World War ===
The modern field of operational research arose during World War II. In the World War II era, operational research was defined as "a scientific method of providing executive departments with a quantitative basis for decisions regarding the operations under their control". Other names for it included operational analysis (UK Ministry of Defence from 1962) and quantitative management.

During the Second World War close to 1,000 men and women in Britain were engaged in operational research. About 200 operational research scientists worked for the British Army.

Patrick Blackett worked for several different organizations during the war. Early in the war while working for the Royal Aircraft Establishment (RAE) he set up a team known as the "Circus" which helped to reduce the number of anti-aircraft artillery rounds needed to shoot down an enemy aircraft from an average of over 20,000 at the start of the Battle of Britain to 4,000 in 1941.

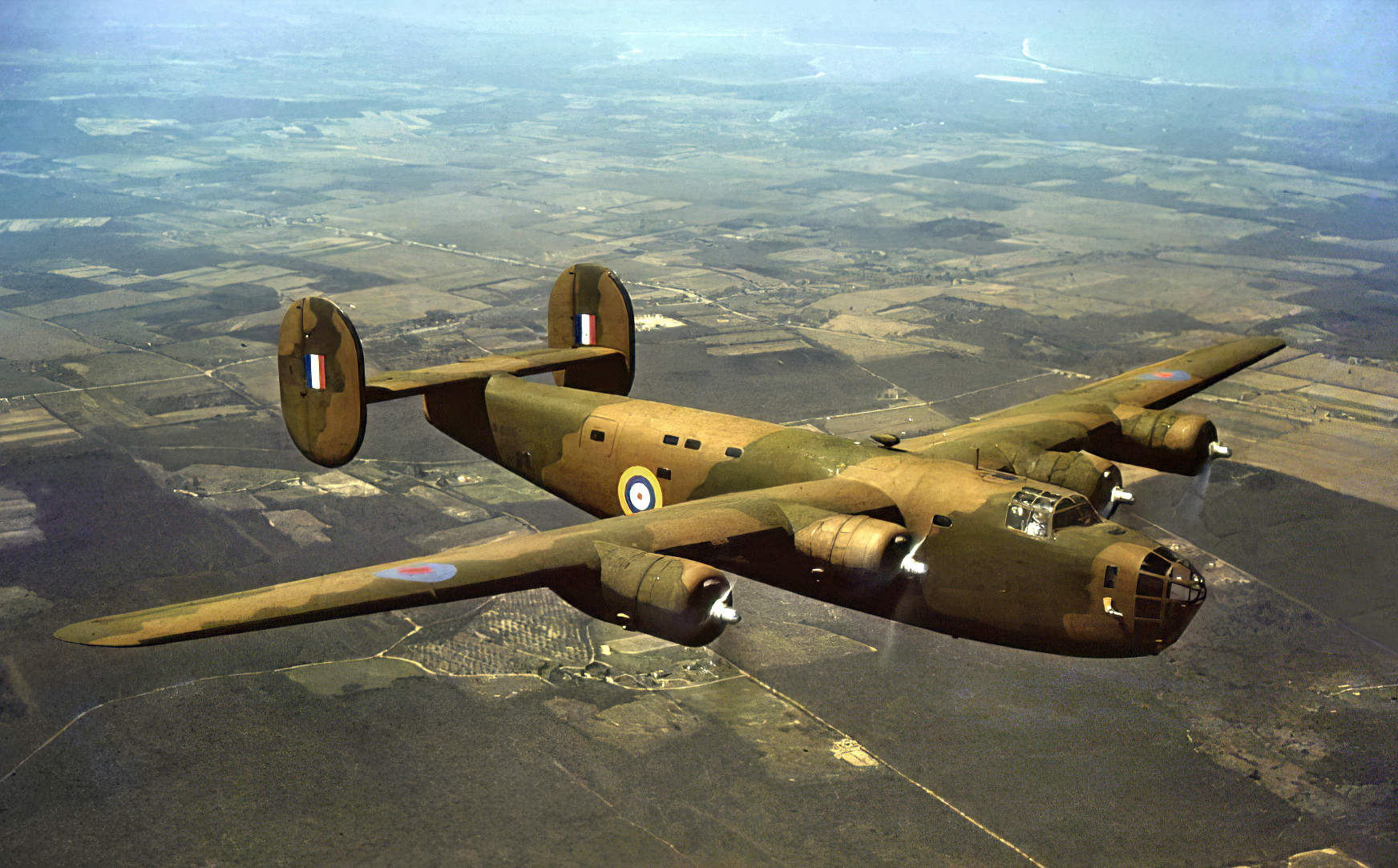
A Liberator in standard RAF green/dark earth/black night bomber finish as originally used by Coastal Command

In 1941, Blackett moved from the RAE to the Navy, after first working with RAF Coastal Command, in 1941 and then early in 1942 to the Admiralty. Blackett's team at Coastal Command's Operational Research Section (CC-ORS) included E. J. Williams, two future Nobel Prize winners and many other people who went on to be pre-eminent in their fields. They undertook a number of crucial analyses that aided the war effort. Britain introduced the convoy system to reduce shipping losses, but while the principle of using warships to accompany merchant ships was generally accepted, it was unclear whether it was better for convoys to be small or large. Convoys travel at the speed of the slowest member, so small convoys can travel faster. It was also argued that small convoys would be harder for German U-boats to detect. On the other hand, large convoys could deploy more warships against an attacker. Blackett's staff showed that the losses suffered by convoys depended largely on the number of escort vessels present, rather than the size of the convoy. Their conclusion was that a few large convoys are more defensible than many small ones.

While performing an analysis of the methods used by RAF Coastal Command to hunt and destroy submarines, one of the analysts asked what colour the aircraft were. As most of them were from Bomber Command they were painted black for night-time operations. At the suggestion of CC-ORS a test was run to see if that was the best colour to camouflage the aircraft for daytime operations in the grey North Atlantic skies. Tests showed that aircraft painted white were on average not spotted until they were 20% closer than those painted black. This change indicated that 30% more submarines would be attacked and sunk for the same number of sightings. As a result of these findings Coastal Command changed their aircraft to using white undersurfaces.

Other work by the CC-ORS indicated that on average if the trigger depth of aerial-delivered depth charges were changed from 100 to 25 feet, the kill ratios would go up. The reason was that if a U-boat saw an aircraft only shortly before it arrived over the target then at 100 feet the charges would do no damage (because the U-boat wouldn't have had time to descend as far as 100 feet), and if it saw the aircraft a long way from the target it had time to alter course under water so the chances of it being within the 20-foot kill zone of the charges was small. It was more efficient to attack those submarines close to the surface when the targets' locations were better known than to attempt their destruction at greater depths when their positions could only be guessed. Before the change of settings from 100 to 25 feet, 1% of submerged U-boats were sunk and 14% damaged. After the change, 7% were sunk and 11% damaged; if submarines were caught on the surface but had time to submerge just before being attacked, the numbers rose to 11% sunk and 15% damaged. Blackett observed "there can be few cases where such a great operational gain had been obtained by such a small and simple change of tactics".

Map of Kammhuber Line

Bomber Command's Operational Research Section (BC-ORS), analyzed a report of a survey carried out by RAF Bomber Command. For the survey, Bomber Command inspected all bombers returning from bombing raids over Germany over a particular period. All damage inflicted by German air defences was noted and the recommendation was given that armour be added in the most heavily damaged areas. This recommendation was not adopted because the fact that the aircraft were able to return with these areas damaged indicated the areas were not vital, and adding armour to non-vital areas where damage is acceptable reduces aircraft performance. Their suggestion to remove some of the crew so that an aircraft loss would result in fewer personnel losses, was also rejected by RAF command. Blackett's team made the logical recommendation that the armour be placed in the areas which were completely untouched by damage in the bombers who returned. They reasoned that the survey was biased, since it only included aircraft that returned to Britain. The areas untouched in returning aircraft were probably vital areas, which, if hit, would result in the loss of the aircraft. Abraham Wald and the Statistical Research Group at Columbia University conducted a similar damage assessment study.

When Germany organized its air defences into the Kammhuber Line, it was realized by the British that if the RAF bombers were to fly in a bomber stream they could overwhelm the night fighters who flew in individual cells directed to their targets by ground controllers. It was then a matter of calculating the statistical loss from collisions against the statistical loss from night fighters to calculate how close the bombers should fly to minimize RAF losses.

The "exchange rate" ratio of output to input was a characteristic feature of operational research. By comparing the number of flying hours put in by Allied aircraft to the number of U-boat sightings in a given area, it was possible to redistribute aircraft to more productive patrol areas. Comparison of exchange rates established "effectiveness ratios" useful in planning. The ratio of 60 mines laid per ship sunk was common to several campaigns: German mines in British ports, British mines on German routes, and United States mines in Japanese routes.

Operational research doubled the on-target bomb rate of B-29s bombing Japan from the Marianas Islands by increasing the training ratio from 4 to 10 percent of flying hours; revealed that wolf-packs of three United States submarines were the most effective number to enable all members of the pack to engage targets discovered on their individual patrol stations; revealed that glossy enamel paint was more effective camouflage for night fighters than conventional dull camouflage paint finish, and a smooth paint finish increased airspeed by reducing skin friction.

On land, the operational research sections of the Army Operational Research Group (AORG) of the Ministry of Supply (MoS) were landed in Normandy in 1944, and they followed British forces in the advance across Europe. They analyzed, among other topics, the effectiveness of artillery, aerial bombing and anti-tank shooting.

=== After World War II ===
In 1947, under the auspices of the British Association, a symposium was organized in Dundee. In his opening address, Watson-Watt offered a definition of the aims of OR:

"To examine quantitatively whether the user organization is getting from the operation of its equipment the best attainable contribution to its overall objective."

With expanded techniques and growing awareness of the field at the close of the war, operational research was no longer limited to only operational, but was extended to encompass equipment procurement, training, logistics and infrastructure. Operations research also grew in many areas other than the military once scientists learned to apply its principles to the civilian sector. The development of the simplex algorithm for linear programming was in 1947.

In the 1950s, the term Operations Research was used to describe heterogeneous mathematical methods such as game theory, dynamic programming, linear programming, warehousing, spare parts theory, queue theory, simulation and production control, which were used primarily in civilian industry. Scientific societies and journals on the subject of operations research were founded in the 1950s, such as the Operation Research Society of America (ORSA) in 1952 and the Institute for Management Science (TIMS) in 1953. Philip Morse, the head of the Weapons Systems Evaluation Group of the Pentagon, became the first president of ORSA and attracted the companies of the military-industrial complex to ORSA, which soon had more than 500 members. In the 1960s, ORSA reached 8000 members. Consulting companies also founded OR groups. In 1953, Abraham Charnes and William Cooper published the first textbook on Linear Programming.

In the 1950s and 1960s, chairs of operations research were established in the U.S. and United Kingdom (from 1964 in Lancaster) in the management faculties of universities. Further influences from the U.S. on the development of operations research in Western Europe can be traced here. The authoritative OR textbooks from the U.S. were published in Germany in German language and in France in French (but not in Italian), such as the book by George Dantzig "Linear Programming"(1963) and the book by C. West Churchman et al. "Introduction to Operations Research"(1957). The latter was also published in Spanish in 1973, opening at the same time Latin American readers to Operations Research. NATO gave important impulses for the spread of Operations Research in Western Europe; NATO headquarters (SHAPE) organised four conferences on OR in the 1950s—the one in 1956 with 120 participants—bringing OR to mainland Europe. Within NATO, OR was also known as "Scientific Advisory" (SA) and was grouped together in the Advisory Group of Aeronautical Research and Development (AGARD). SHAPE and AGARD organized an OR conference in April 1957 in Paris. When France withdrew from the NATO military command structure, the transfer of NATO headquarters from France to Belgium led to the institutionalization of OR in Belgium, where Jacques Drèze founded CORE, the Center for Operations Research and Econometrics at the Catholic University of Leuven in 1966.

With the development of computers over the next three decades, operations research can now solve problems with hundreds of thousands of variables and constraints. Moreover, the large volumes of data required for such problems can now be stored and manipulated very efficiently." Much of operations research (modernly known as 'analytics') relies upon stochastic variables and a therefore access to truly random numbers. Fortunately, the cybernetics field also required the same level of randomness. The development of increasingly better random number generators has been a boon to both disciplines. Modern applications of operations research includes city planning, football strategies, emergency planning, optimizing all facets of industry and economy, and undoubtedly with the likelihood of the inclusion of terrorist attack planning and definitely counterterrorist attack planning. More recently, the research approach of operations research, which dates back to the 1950s, has been criticized for being collections of mathematical models but lacking an empirical basis of data collection for applications. How to collect data is not presented in the textbooks. Because of the lack of data, there are also no computer applications in the textbooks.

== Problems addressed ==
- Critical path analysis or project planning: identifying those processes in a multiple-dependency project which affect the overall duration of the project
- Floorplanning: designing the layout of equipment in a factory or components on a computer chip to reduce manufacturing time (therefore reducing cost)
- Network optimization: for instance, setup of telecommunications or power system networks to maintain quality of service during outages
- Resource allocation problems
- Facility location
- Assignment Problems:
  - Assignment problem
  - Generalized assignment problem
  - Quadratic assignment problem
  - Weapon target assignment problem
- Bayesian search theory: looking for a target
- Optimal search
- Routing, such as determining the routes of buses so that as few buses are needed as possible
- Supply chain management: managing the flow of raw materials and products based on uncertain demand for the finished products
- Project production activities: managing the flow of work activities in a capital project in response to system variability through operations research tools for variability reduction and buffer allocation using a combination of allocation of capacity, inventory and time
- Efficient messaging and customer response tactics
- Automation: automating or integrating robotic systems in human-driven operations processes
- Globalization: globalizing operations processes in order to take advantage of cheaper materials, labor, land or other productivity inputs
- Transportation: managing freight transportation and delivery systems (Examples: LTL shipping, intermodal freight transport, travelling salesman problem, driver scheduling problem)
- Scheduling:
  - Personnel staffing
  - Manufacturing steps
  - Project tasks
  - Network data traffic: these are known as queueing models or queueing systems.
  - Sports events and their television coverage
- Blending of raw materials in oil refineries
- Determining optimal prices, in many retail and B2B settings, within the disciplines of pricing science
- Cutting stock problem: Cutting small items out of bigger ones.
- Finding the optimal parameter (weights) setting of an algorithm that generates the realisation of a figured bass in Baroque compositions (classical music) by using weighted local cost and transition cost rules

Operational research is also used extensively in government where evidence-based policy is used.

== Management science ==
The field of management science (MS) is known as using operations research models in business. Stafford Beer characterized this in 1967. Like operational research itself, management science is an interdisciplinary branch of applied mathematics devoted to optimal decision planning, with strong links with economics, business, engineering, and other sciences. It uses various scientific research-based principles, strategies, and analytical methods including mathematical modeling, statistics and numerical algorithms to improve an organization's ability to enact rational and meaningful management decisions by arriving at optimal or near-optimal solutions to sometimes complex decision problems. Management scientists help businesses to achieve their goals using the scientific methods of operational research.

The management scientist's mandate is to use rational, systematic, science-based techniques to inform and improve decisions of all kinds. Of course, the techniques of management science are not restricted to business applications but may also be applied to military, medical, public administration, charitable, political, or community groups.

Management science is concerned with developing and applying models and concepts that may prove useful in helping to illuminate management issues and solve managerial problems, as well as designing and developing new and better models of organizational excellence.

=== Related fields ===
Some of the fields that have considerable overlap with Operations Research and Management Science include:

- Artificial Intelligence
- Business analytics
- Computer science
- Data mining/Data science/Big data
- Decision analysis
- Decision intelligence
- Engineering
- Financial engineering
- Forecasting
- Game theory
- Geography/Geographic information science
- Graph theory
- Industrial engineering
- Inventory control
- Logistics
- Mathematical modeling
- Mathematical optimization
- Probability and statistics
- Project management
- Policy analysis
- Queueing theory
- Simulation
- Social network/Transportation forecasting models
- Stochastic processes
- Supply chain management
- Systems engineering

=== Applications ===
Applications are abundant such as in airlines, manufacturing companies, service organizations, military branches, and government. The range of problems and issues to which it has contributed insights and solutions is vast. It includes:

- Scheduling (of airlines, trains, buses etc.)
- Assignment (assigning crew to flights, trains or buses; employees to projects; commitment and dispatch of power generation facilities)
- Facility location (deciding most appropriate location for new facilities such as warehouses; factories or fire station)
- Hydraulics & Piping Engineering (managing flow of water from reservoirs)
- Health Services (information and supply chain management)
- Game Theory (identifying, understanding; developing strategies adopted by companies)
- Urban Design
- Computer Network Engineering (packet routing; timing; analysis)
- Telecom & Data Communication Engineering (packet routing; timing; analysis)

Management is also concerned with so-called soft-operational analysis which concerns methods for strategic planning, strategic decision support, problem structuring methods. In dealing with these sorts of challenges, mathematical modeling and simulation may not be appropriate or may not suffice. Therefore, during the past 30 years, a number of non-quantified modeling methods have been developed. These include:

- stakeholder based approaches including metagame analysis and drama theory
- morphological analysis and various forms of influence diagrams
- cognitive mapping
- strategic choice
- robustness analysis

== Societies and journals ==
=== Societies ===
The International Federation of Operational Research Societies (IFORS) is an umbrella organization for operational research societies worldwide, representing approximately 50 national societies including those in the US, UK, France, Germany, Italy, Canada, Australia, New Zealand, Philippines, India, Japan and South Africa. For the institutionalization of Operations Research, the foundation of IFORS in 1960 was of decisive importance, which stimulated the foundation of national OR societies in Austria, Switzerland and Germany. IFORS held important international conferences every three years since 1957. The constituent members of IFORS form regional groups, such as that in Europe, the Association of European Operational Research Societies (EURO). Other important operational research organizations are Simulation Interoperability Standards Organization (SISO) and Interservice/Industry Training, Simulation and Education Conference (I/ITSEC)

In 2004, the US-based organization INFORMS began an initiative to market the OR profession better, including a website entitled The Science of Better which provides an introduction to OR and examples of successful applications of OR to industrial problems. This initiative has been adopted by the Operational Research Society in the UK, including a website entitled Learn About OR.

=== Journals of INFORMS ===
The Institute for Operations Research and the Management Sciences (INFORMS) publishes thirteen scholarly journals about operations research, including the top two journals in their class, according to 2005 Journal Citation Reports. They are:

- Decision Analysis
- Information Systems Research
- INFORMS Journal on Computing
- INFORMS Transactions on Education (an open access journal)
- Interfaces
- Management Science
- Manufacturing & Service Operations Management
- Marketing Science
- Mathematics of Operations Research
- Operations Research
- Organization Science
- Service Science
- Transportation Science

=== Other journals ===
These are listed in alphabetical order of their titles.

- 4OR-A Quarterly Journal of Operations Research: jointly published the Belgian, French and Italian Operations Research Societies (Springer);
- Decision Sciences published by Wiley-Blackwell on behalf of the Decision Sciences Institute
- European Journal of Operational Research (EJOR): Founded in 1975 and is presently by far the largest operational research journal in the world, with its around 9,000 pages of published papers per year. In 2004, its total number of citations was the second largest amongst Operational Research and Management Science journals;
- INFOR Journal: published and sponsored by the Canadian Operational Research Society;
- Journal of Defense Modeling and Simulation (JDMS): Applications, Methodology, Technology: a quarterly journal devoted to advancing the science of modeling and simulation as it relates to the military and defense.
- Journal of the Operational Research Society (JORS): an official journal of The OR Society; this is the oldest continuously published journal of OR in the world, published by Taylor & Francis;
- Military Operations Research (MOR): published by the Military Operations Research Society;
- Omega - The International Journal of Management Science;
- Operations Research Letters;
- Opsearch: official journal of the Operational Research Society of India;
- OR Insight: a quarterly journal of The OR Society published by Palgrave;
- Pesquisa Operacional, the official journal of the Brazilian Operations Research Society
- Production and Operations Management, the official journal of the Production and Operations Management Society
- TOP: the official journal of the Spanish Statistics and Operations Research Society.

== See also ==
Operations research topics

- Black box analysis
- Dynamic programming
- Inventory theory
- Optimal maintenance
- Real options valuation
- Artificial intelligence

Operations researchers

- Operations researchers (category)
- George Dantzig
- Leonid Kantorovich
- Tjalling Koopmans
- Russell L. Ackoff
- Stafford Beer
- Alfred Blumstein
- C. West Churchman
- William W. Cooper
- Robert Dorfman
- Richard M. Karp
- Ramayya Krishnan
- Frederick W. Lanchester
- Thomas L. Magnanti
- Alvin E. Roth
- Peter Whittle

Related fields

- Behavioral operations research
- Big data
- Business engineering
- Business process management
- Database normalization
- Engineering management
- Geographic information systems
- Industrial engineering
- Industrial organization
- Managerial economics
- Military simulation
- Operational level of war
- Power system simulation
- Project production management
- Reliability engineering
- Scientific management
- Search-based software engineering
- Simulation modeling
- Strategic management
- Supply chain engineering
- System safety
- Wargaming
